= Sina Khani =

German-Iranian artist, musician, comedian, and filmmaker

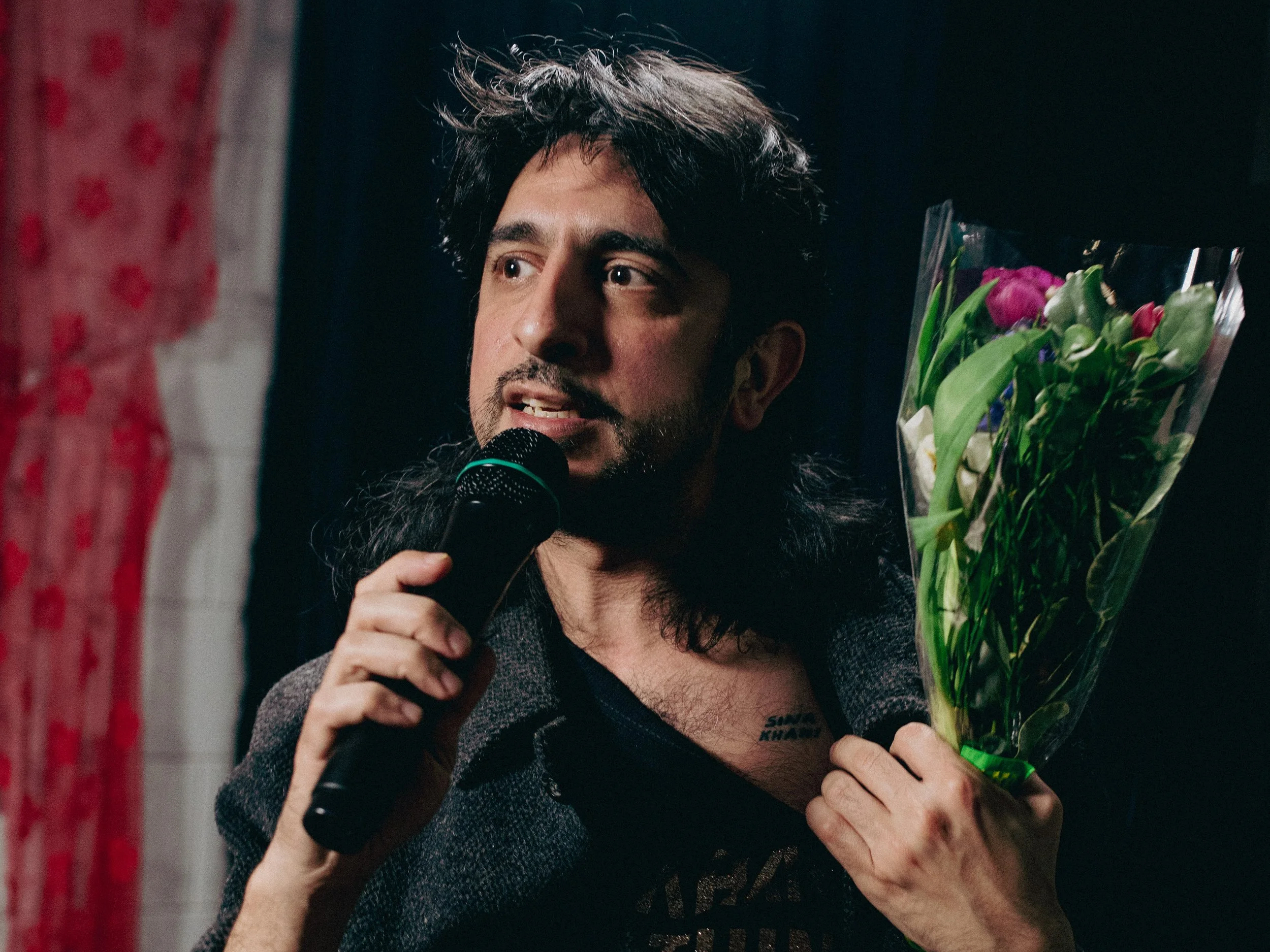
Sina Khani at the premiere of Creeps 5 in Amsterdam

Sina Khani (born 1982) is a German‑Iranian multidisciplinary artist, musician, comedian, and filmmaker, active in Amsterdam, Berlin, and Bochum. He is the creator and lead performer of the satirical web series Creeps From The Middle East, known for blending absurdist humor, mockumentary elements, and social critique.

== Career ==
=== Early work and The Sina Khani Show ===
Khani graduated from the Rietveld Academie Amsterdam in 2008. His graduation project, The Sina Khani Show, produced via Mediamatic, mimics the late‑night talk show format. Mediamatic described it as: "Sina Khani is the new David Letterman. Without the budget, without the connections and without the humor."

Among his early works is the student short film Inhalal Versus Exhalal, which was screened at the Netherlands Film Festival.

=== Music ===
Khani has released several offbeat singles at Blowpipe Records. In a 2015 interview, he described transitioning from comedic performance to music, and listed "Shrek" among his early releases. He directed the music video for the song "The Sky-Fun Reels And Angelica Kneels" by Dutch singer-songwriter Harry Merry (2014).

In 2016, Khani performed a satirical hymn for the German football club VfL Bochum, expressing his admiration for the team.

=== Writing ===
Khani is the author of The Artist-Mullah-Construction-Essay, published at Veenman Publishers, a book that explores aspects of Persian identity and cultural archetypes.

In February 2026, he founded The Unsafe Journal. The magazine has featured works from contributors including the Russian protest art collective Pussy Riot, Arash Sedighi, Paul Rhoads, Veli Silver and Willehad Eilers.

=== Creeps from the Middle East ===
Khani is the principal creator of Creeps from the Middle East, a black-and-white, semi-scripted comedy series. The series blends satire, performance, and confrontation.

The series has featured a range of contributors from music, theatre, and comedy, including Mohsen Namjoo, Hans Teeuwen, Gover Meit (also known as Stefano Keizers or Donny Ronny), Adelheid Roosen, Aerea Negrot, San Proper, Michiel Lieuwma and Tarik Sadouma.

=== Media engagement and controversies ===
In 2024, FeltenINK reported that Hans Teeuwen was considering legal action over a scene in Creeps from the Middle East, following provocative interactions involving Khani.

Sina Khani appeared as a guest in Open Geesten #26, a podcast episode where he discussed his independent format and creative philosophy with host Michiel Lieuwma.

Khani was a member of The Unsafe House, an Amsterdam-based art collective. The group has described its work as engaging with classical artistic themes and practices through contemporary and experimental methods. The Unsafe House proposed a project for the U.S. Pavilion at the 2026 Venice Biennale, intended to present an alternative approach to conventional exhibition formats. In August 2026 Khani announced his split from The Unsafe House, which lead him to write and direct the short film Sina Songwriter in collaboration with Tom Elswijk.

On the Unsafe House Podcast, Khani and Ruth Spetter interviewed Tarik Sadouma, Mohsen Namjoo and Ronja Brainstorm.

Khani has made several public performances, including an appearance on the German dating show First Dates, during which he stated that no woman should date him.

Khani co‑authored the satirical manuscript Fart School with Tunç Topçuoğlu while studying at the Gerrit Rietveld Academie. The work was originally canceled by their tutors Linda van Deursen and Will Holder due to its provocative content, but was published independently seventeen years later for its irreverent critique of institutionalized art and artistic censorship.

== Reception and criticism ==
Khani's work often divides audiences. Ray Jackson of FeltenINK frames Creeps from the Middle East as deliberately provocative, pushing boundaries to expose ideological contradictions in art, religion, and media. Critical commentary has questioned whether the show's shock tactics constitute meaningful critique or performative provocation.

Since August 2025, Khani has been contributing to Leipzig & The Wokies (Scorched Earth), a film documenting the cancellation of a planned event at the Academy of Fine Arts Leipzig (Hochschule für Grafik und Buchkunst, HGB) following accusations of extremism.
