= Wim Cuyvers =

Belgian architect

Wim Cuyvers (born 19 February 1958) is a Belgian architect living in Châtillon, France.

Cuyvers is known for blending design projects, with a specific interest in private houses and schools, and study projects, a.o. into the postwar condition of cities like Sarajevo and Pristina and into informal uses at rest places along highways. Wim Cuyvers quit architectural practice after having a highly successful career, with a solo exhibition at deSingel Art Centre in Antwerp (1995) and winning the prestigious culture award by the Flemish Government (2005). In 2000 Cuyvers moved to the Jura in France to start a refuge project called Montavoix. Although latest works has been often categorized as art, Wim Cuyvers still claims these works to be site-specific meditations on public space and architecture more in general.

== Biography ==
Born in Hasselt, Belgium, Wim Cuyvers graduated in architecture at the Ghent Academy (1977–1982). He worked in the United States at Preston Phillips and Venturi, Rauch & Scott Brown. Later he worked at Paul Robbrecht and Hilde Daem Architects in Ghent, Belgium. He started his own architectural office in 1984 in Ghent, Belgium. Cuyvers has been teaching at the Sint-Lucas School of Architecture in Ghent, the Academie voor Bouwkunst in Tilburg and the Design Academy Eindhoven. Until 2008 he has been advising researcher at the Jan van Eyck Academie in Maastricht.

== Projects ==
- Woning Baete Doubbel, private house, Gits, 2000
- Weeping Building, crematorium, Sint-Niklaas, competition entry, 2004
- Stroom Arts Centre, centre for visual arts, The Hague, 2005
- Intervention at Rozebeke Cemetery, in the context of the Zwalm & Art Biennial, 2007
- Namahn, private house and office, Saint-Josse-ten-Noode, 2009
- Montavoix, refuge, near Saint-Claude, France, 2000-ongoing

== Theater ==
In 2012 Cuyvers did the scenography for the play MEDIUM (Buda Kunstencentrum & De Werf & Vrijstaat O.) written by Tijs Ceulemans, Peter Aers and Leentje Vandenbussche.

== Awards ==
On 8 February 2006 Wim Cuyvers received the prestigious Flemish Culture Prize 2005 (Cultuurprijs Vlaanderen 2005) in the Architecture category.

== Bibliography ==
- Wim Cuyvers, exhibition catalogue with texts by Wim Cuyvers and Bart Lootsma, deSingel, Antwerp, 1995. ISBN 9075591012
- Beograd The Hague. About the impossibility of planning, Stroom, Den Haag, 2003. ISBN 9073799376
- Text on Text, Stroom, Den Haag, 2005. ISBN 9073799449
- Brakin. Brazzaville-Kinshasa. Visualizing the visible. with Agency, Kristien Van den Brande, Tina Clausmeyer, Dirk Pauwels & SMAQ, Lars Müller Verlag, Baden and Jan van Eyck Academie, Maastricht. ISBN 9783037780763
- Poor Being Poor, Initia, Brussel, 2011. ISBN 90-73799-44-9 ISBN 9789077905005
- L'Autre, Frans Masereel Centrum, Kasterlee, 2020. ISBN 9789492707031

== See also ==
- Émile Thielens
- Bobby Fogel
- Léon Van Dievoet
