= The Sound of Silence (disambiguation) =

"The Sound of Silence" is a 1965 song by Simon and Garfunkel, covered by Disturbed in 2015.

"Sounds of Silence" is a 1966 album also by Simon & Garfunkel

The Sound of Silence or Sounds of Silence may also refer to:

== Films ==
- Sounds of Silence (2006 film), a documentary about music in Iran
- Sound of Silence (2017 film), an Indian film
- The Sound of Silence (2019 film), an American drama

== Music ==
- The Sound of Silence (album), 1968 album by Carmen McRae
- 4′33″, a three-movement composition by American experimental composer John Cage, also known as The Sounds of Silence
- "Sound of Silence" (Dami Im song), Australia's entry at the Eurovision Song Contest 2016

== Television ==
- "The Sound of Silence" (Grey's Anatomy), the ninth episode of the twelfth season of Grey's Anatomy
- "The Sound of Silence" (UFO), the 19th episode of UFO
- "Sound of Silence", an episode of The Loud House
- "Sounds of Silence" (CSI), the 20th episode of the first season of CSI: Crime Scene Investigation
- "Sounds of Silence", the 23rd episode of the eighth season of My Little Pony: Friendship Is Magic

== See also ==
- The Sound of Music (disambiguation)
