= The Unsafe House =

Art Collective

The Unsafe House is a Dutch art collective and studio based in The Netherlands. The group describes itself as avant-garde. It seeks to cultivate what it terms "unsafe ideas.

== History ==
=== Origins ===
The Unsafe House was founded in 2021 following its first public exhibition at Studio The Unsafe House in Amsterdam by Tarik Sadouma.

In a 2025 interview in FeltenINK, member Tarik Sadouma discussed his upbringing. Sadouma is a founding member of the Dutch video art collective Keeping It Real Art Critics (KIRAC).

== Activities ==
The collective produces installations, sculptures and paintings. Its public programs included events such as The Unsafe Podcast and Unsafe Talks, which feature conversations with artists, thinkers, and public figures. Notable guests include Iranian musician Mohsen Namjoo and Ronja Brainstorm.

== Creeps from the Middle East ==
The Unsafe House is affiliated with the satirical series Creeps from the Middle East, starring comedian Sina Khani. The project combines fictional and documentary elements with film noir and absurdist comedy. Members of the collective have appeared in the series and contributed to its production. In August 2026, Khani announced his split from The Unsafe House.

== 2026 Biennale proposal ==
In 2025, Yarvin unsuccessfully proposed a project, titled Salon des Déplorables, and drew inspiration from the 19th-century Salon des Refusés and aimed to challenge perceived ideological orthodoxy in contemporary art institutions.

== Reception ==
Hyperallergic criticized their Venice Biennale proposal, suggesting it illustrated limitations in far-right cultural production.
