= Antwerp Central (film) =

- Film poster
- Directed by: Peter Krüger
- Written by: Peter Krüger text inspired by Austerlitz by W.G. Sebald
- Produced by: Sophimage (Jan Roekens)
- Starring: Johan Leysen, Thessa Krüger.
- Cinematography: Rimvydas Leipus
- Edited by: Els Voorspoels, Nico Leunen
- Music by: Walter Hus
- Production companies: Sophimage, developed with the support of = the Media Programme of the European Union; and Vlaams Audiovisueel Fonds, Eurostation and the Taxshelter of Belgian federal Government, Nationalle Loterij. In co-production with R.T.F., Canvas, and RSI.
- Release date: 17 March 2011 (Montreal)
- Running time: 93 minutes
- Country: Belgium
- Languages: Dutch, subtitles English and French

Antwerp Central is a Belgian feature film, which was screened at several film festivals in 2011 and received its world premiere in Montreal at the International Festival of Films on Art, where it won the 29th, FIFA Montréal, Winner Grand Prix. The film is written and directed by Peter Krüger.

Drawing inspiration from the book Austerlitz by W.G. Sebald, the film is a historical, mildly ironic and contemplative look at the Central Station in Antwerp as a magical realistic location where past and present, history and daily life, fiction and reality are in constant flux. Running as a thread through the film are the dreams and reminiscences of a traveler, played by Johan Leysen, who arrives at Antwerp Central and through whose eyes we observe the station.

The film's cast includes Johan Leysen (traveler), and Thessa Krüger (little girl).
