= N – The Madness of Reason =

2014 Belgian documentary film

- Directed by: Peter Krüger
- Written by: Peter Krüger; Ben Okri
- Produced by: Peter Krüger
- Starring: Michael Lonsdale; Abiba Sawadogo; Hamadoun Kassogue; Vieux Farka Touré
- Cinematography: Rimvydas Leipus
- Edited by: Nico Leunen
- Music by: Walter Hus
- Production company: Inti Films
- Release date: 8 February 2014 (Germany)
- Running time: 102 minutes
- Countries: Netherlands, Belgium, Germany
- Languages: French, English, African languages

N – The Madness of Reason is a 2014 Belgian documentary film written (in collaboration with Ben Okri) and directed by Peter Krüger.

== Synopsis ==
The film explores the life of Raymond Borremans, a freewheeling Parisian musician turned encyclopedia enthusiast whose fascination with the history and customs of West Africa lead to his compiling a book on the subject. Encyclopédie Borremans was left uncompleted on his death in 1988, at the age of 82. He got to the letter "N", hence the film's name. N – The Madness of Reason combines elements of documentary, biopic, and fiction.

== Cast ==
The film's cast includes Michael Lonsdale (narrator), Abiba Sawadogo, Hamadoun Kassogue, and Vieux Farka Touré.

== Release ==
The film was screened at several film festivals in 2014 and was slated for general release on February 8, 2014.

N – The Madness of Reason received three nominations at the 2015 Ostend Film Festival, winning the Ensor Award for Best Film (for the director Peter Krüger), the Ensor Award for Best Editing (for the editor Nico Leunen), and the Ensor Award for Best Music (for the composer Walter Hus). At the 2014 Cine Migrante International Film Festival in Brasília, the film won the 2014 Jury Award for Best Film.
