= List of Inti Films films =

This following is a list of films produced, co-produced and/or released by Inti Films.

== 2010s - Inti Films ==
=== Feature films ===
Release date	Title	Directors	Notes
2012	Kinshasa Kids	Marc-Henri Wajnberg	Feature Film, 90 minutes Produced by Wajnbrosse Productions. Co-produced by Crescendo Films and Inti Films.
2013	Drift	Benny Vandendriessche in collaboration with visual artist Dirk Hendrikx	Feature Film, 83 minutes Produced by Inti Films and Revolver Media. The film had its world premiere at the Busan International Film Festival.: Winner - FIPRESCI award, Mannheim-Heidelberg International Film Festival.
2014	N - The Madness of Reason	Peter Krüger	Feature Film, 110 minutes Produced by Inti Films. Co-produced by Cobra Films, Dieptescherpte, Blinker Filmproduktion. Official trailer at Vimeo.Official trailer at YouTube.: Winner - Ensor Award for Best Film, Ostend Film Festival.; Winner - 2015 Ensor Award for Best Editing, Ostend Film Festival.; Winner - 2015 Ensor Award for Best Music, Ostend Film Festival.; Nominated - 2015 Ensor Award for Best D.O.P.; Nominated - 2015 Ensor Award for Best Film, Ostend Film Festival.; Nominated - 2015 Ensor Award for Best Editing, Ostend Film Festival.; Nominated - 2015 Ensor Award for Best Music, Ostend Film Festival.; Nominated - 2014 Jury Award for Best Film, Cine Migrante International Film Festival, Brasilia, Brazil.
2016	Bodkin Ras	Kaweh Modiri	Feature Film, 90 minutes Co-produced by Inti Films and Revolver Media.: Winner - 2016 FIPRESCI award for Best Film in Bright Future, International Film Festival Rotterdam.

=== Creative documentary films ===
Release date	Title	Directors	Notes
2011	Desert Island	Steven Thielemans	Creative Documentary film, 52 minutes Produced by Inti Films. With the support of Flanders Audiovisual Fund (VAF), and VRT. Official Website.http://www.iledeserte-film.be

=== Art films ===
Release date	Title	Directors	Notes
2015	Vita Brevis	Thierry Knauff	Art Film, 12 minutes Co-produced by Inti Films and Films du Sablier. Released at 2015 International Film Festival Rotterdam.

== 2000s - Inti Films ==
=== Creative documentary films ===
Release date	Title	Directors	Notes
2000	The Stars' Caravan	Arto Halonen	Creative Documentary Film, 52 minutes Produced by Millennium Film. Co-produced by Inti Films and RTBF, Franco-German Network ARTE, Finnish Broadcasting Company (YLE), DR TV, and Czech Television.
2001	The Good Shepherd	Markku Lehmuskallio Anastasia Lapsui	Creative Documentary Film, 52 and 57 minutes Produced by Inti Films and Millennium Film. With the support of the Flanders Audiovisual Fund (VAF), Vlaamse Radio- en Televisieomroeporganisatie (VRT), RTBF, Franco-German Network ARTE / Belgium, HOS (N), Finnish Broadcasting Company (YLE), AVEK, The Promotion Centre for Audiovisual Culture, and Seriges television (SVT).
2001	The Eclipse of Sint-Gillis	Peter Krüger; Peter Brosens	Documentary film, 35 minutes Theme-evening for ARTE. Produced by Inti Films. Co-produced by ma.ja.de., and ZDF/ARTE. Extract 1 on YouTube. Extract 2 on YouTube.
2002	Ikones / Boudauin I	Manu Riche	Creative Documentary Film, 52 minutes Produced by Gloria Film, Paris, France 3, RTBF. Co-produced by Inti Films.
2003	The Inheritance	Peter Hegedus	Creative Documentary Film, 52 minutes Produced by Soul Vision Films, Australian Fin. Coop., SBS, VPRO. Co-produced by Inti Films.
2003	The Virgin Diaries	Jessica Woodworth	Creative Documentary Film, 52 minutes Produced by The Icehouse, ZDF/ARTE, HOS, Finnish Broadcasting Company (YLE), ITVS, LICHTPUNT, RTBF. Co-produded by Inti Films, ma.ja.de., and Lemming Film.
2007	The Last Sigh	Peter Krüger	Creative Documentary Film Produced by Inti Films.

=== Short films ===
Release date	Title	Directors	Notes
2004	The Strange Man	Peter Krüger	Film, 25 minutes Produced by Inti Films. With the support of the Flanders Audiovisual Fund (VAF), Province Oost-Vlaanderen, National Lotery.
2006	Los Hervideros	Jan de Coster	Film, 90 minutes Produced by Inti Films. With the support of the Flanders Audiovisual Fund (VAF), SCACD.

=== Art films ===
Release date	Title	Directors	Notes
2005	The River of Donkeys	Jan de Coster	Music Film, 15 minutes Produced by Inti Films.
2008	Episode III: Enjoy Poverty	Renzo Martens	Art Film, 90 minutes Produced by Renzo Martens. Co-produced by Inti Films. With the support of Flanders Audiovisual Fund (VAF), Nederlands Filmfonds (the, Netherlands Film Fund), Nationale Commissie voor internationale samenwerking en Duurzame Ontwikkeling (NCDO), Prins Bernhard Cultuurfonds, Mondriaan Fonds, VPRO Lichtpunt, Finnish Broadcasting Company (YLE), TSR, and Österreichischer Rundfunk (ORF).

== 1990s - Inti Films ==
=== Feature films ===
Release date	Title	Directors	Notes
1998	State of Dogs	Peter Brosen Dorjkhandyn Turmunkh	Feature Film, 85 minutes Produced by Inti Films. Co-produced by Baltazar Film, Magic Hour Films, Juniper Films, Point of View, CBA, ZDF/ARTE, Österreichischer Rundfunk (ORF), and Tobch Toli. With the support of Media 1, and Media 2. Official Trailer on Vimeo.: Winner - 1998 Grand Prix, Visions du Réel – Festival international de cinéma Nyon, Switzerland.; Winner - Grand Prix, Maremma, Firenze.; Winner - 1998 Grand Prize, Cine'Eco, Festival Internacional de Cinema Ambiental da Serra da Estrela, Portugal.; Winner - 1998 Critics Award, 22nd Mostra International De Cinema Sāo Paulo, Sāo Paulo, Brazil.; Winner - Best Feature Film Award”, International Environmental Film Festival (FICMA), Gava, Spain.; Winner - European Lianas for Best Documentary, New European Talent - NET 98 European Film and TV Market, Barcelona, Spain.; Winner - 1998 Special Jury Award, Message to Man, International Film Festival, Saint Petersburg, Russia.; Winner - Mention Spéciale du Jury, 1ère Semaine du Documentaire de Création Européen, Strasbourg, France.; Winner - Best Script Award, MediaWave, Györ, Hungary.; Winner - Critics Award, Bodrum, Turkey.; Winner - Silver Award, The World Festival of Human and Nature Films, Busan, South Korea.; Winner - Best Documentary and FICC Prize, Kiev, Ukraine.; Winner - Grand Award, Biennale für Medien und Architektur Graz, Austria.; Winner - Fonske, KFL-Katholieke Filmliga.

=== Short films ===
Release date	Title	Directors	Notes
1998	Real Men Eat Meat	Maria von Heland	Film, 24 minutes Produced by Min Films, Egoli Tossell Film, SVT and Film I Väst, Wave Pictures. Co-produced by Inti Films, and Tobch Toli Productions.

=== Creative documentary films ===
Release date	Title	Directors	Notes
1993	The Path of Time	Peter Brosens	Creative Documentary Film, 10 minutes, Produced by Inti Films.
1994	City of The Steppes	Peter Brosens; Odo Halflants	Creative Documentary Film, 52 minutes Co-produced by Stuc and AVD KULeuven.
1995	News Items	Peter Krüger; Gerrit Messiaen	Creative Documentary Film, minutes Produced by Inti Films.
1995	The Death of James Lee Byars	Peter Brosens	Creative Documentary Film, 24 minutes Co-produced by Inti Films, Fondation Cartier pour l’art contemporain, Paris; and Vlaamse Gemeenschapscommissie.
1997	Nazareth	Peter Krüger	Creative Documentary Film, 52 minutes Produced by Inti Films. Co-produced by VRT/RTBF, YLE, Juniper Films, TSR, BR, and Egoli Tosell Film.
1997	Roberte’s Dance	Peter Krüger; Gerrit Messiaen	Creative Documentary Film, 23 minutes Produced by Inti Films, d.net.work, and ZDF/ARTE.
1997	Not all the World Does is Good for a Mennonite	Lut Vandekeybus	Creative Documentary Film, 58 minutes Co-production by Inti Films, and Lemming Film.
1998	Roberte’s Dance	Peter Krüger; Gerrit Messiaen	Creative Documentary Film, 23 minutes Produced by Inti Films, d.net.work, and ZDF/ARTE.
1999	Poets of Mongolia	Peter Brosens; Peter Krüger; Sakhya Byamba	Creative Documentary Film, 52 minutes Produced by Inti Films, Millennium Film, Finnish Broadcasting Company (YLE), and Franco-German Network ARTE. Official Trailer.
