= Iranian demonstrations in Strasbourg =

Demonstration by Iranians against the IRGC in Strasbourg, France

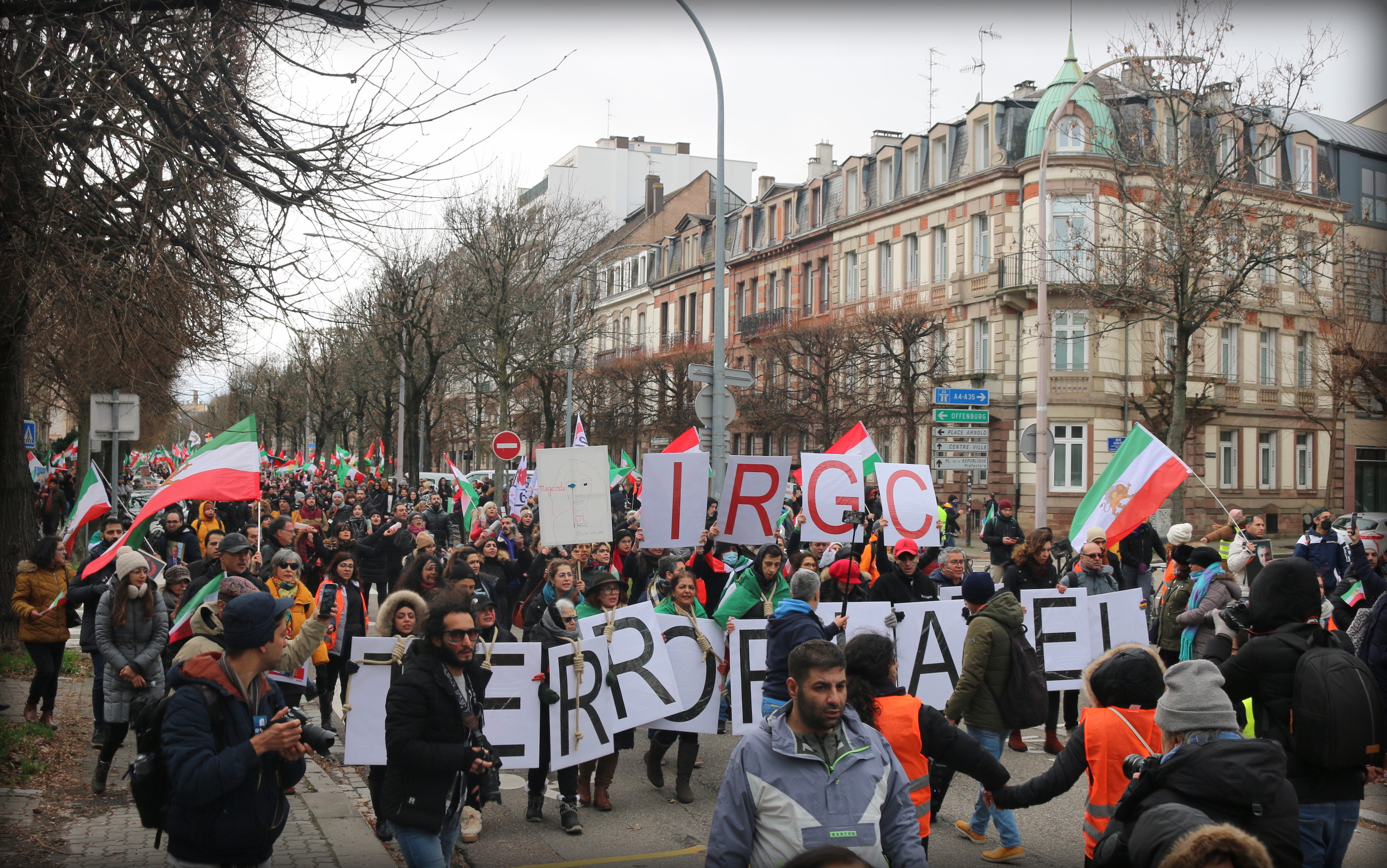
Anti-IRGC demonstration in Strasbourg, January 2023

The demonstration of Iranians in Strasbourg, France, took place on 16 January 2023 (26 Dey 1401) in front of the European Parliament, amid the Mahsa Amini protests. Its goal was to urge the European Union to designate the Islamic Revolutionary Guard Corps (IRGC) as a terrorist organization. Roberta Metsola, the head of this parliament, said to the Iranians: "You stand on the right side of history and you will make history, and we will not leave you alone".

== The purpose of the demonstration ==
The demonstration was intended to reflect the desire of many Iranians for the IRGC to be recognized as a terrorist organization by Europe and the international community. On Monday, January 26, thousands of Iranians living in France and other European countries traveled to Strasbourg to gather in front of the European Parliament headquarters, demanding that the Islamic Revolutionary Guard Corps be designated as a terrorist organization. Europe was urged to take further decisive action against the Islamic Republic of Iran's violent crackdown on protesters in recent months.

The gathering was held to express solidarity with the protesters inside Iran and to urge European authorities to take stronger action against the Islamic Republic of Iran. The rally took place after more than a hundred members of the European Parliament signed a letter urging the European Union to take new measures against Tehran's regime.

Several members of the European Parliament have also offered political guarantees for detained protesters sentenced to death in Iran. Although largely symbolic, this act is regarded as a form of political pressure on the Iranian government.

Demonstrators also called for the expulsion of Iranian ambassadors from EU member states and the withdrawal of European ambassadors from Tehran. Several members of European parliaments of Iranian descent supported the gathering and urged Iranians to take part in the event.

A day before the gathering of Iranians in Strasbourg, Prince Reza Pahlavi, Masih Ali Nejad, Ali Karimi, Golshifteh Farahani and Nazanin Fanadi in a joint tweet called on the countries of the world to designate the IRGC as terrorist organization. In this joint tweet, it was stated: "For more than four decades, the IRGC has been terrorizing, suppressing and killing inside and outside Iran."
