= Bodkin Ras =

- Directed by: Kaweh Modiri
- Written by: Kaweh Modiri
- Produced by: Main producer: Raymond van der Kaaij (Revolver Amsterdam); Co-producer: Peter Krüger, (Inti Films) Co-producer: Kaweh Modiri
- Starring: Sohrab Bayat; Lily Szramko; James Macmillan; Eddie Paton
- Cinematography: Daan Nieuwenhuijs
- Edited by: Jan de Coster
- Music by: Mohsen Namjoo
- Production companies: Revolver Amsterdam, the Netherlands; Inti Films, Belgium; Blue Iris Films, UK
- Distributed by: Mokum, NL
- Release date: January 31, 2016
- Running time: 78 minutes
- Countries: Netherlands, Belgium
- Language: English

Bodkin Ras is a 2016 Dutch and Belgian film directed by Kaweh Modiri and starring Sohrab Bayat, Lily Szramko, James Macmillan, and Eddie Paton. It premiered in March 2016 at the 45th International Film Festival Rotterdam where it won the International FIPRESCI award, and had its North American premiere in March 2016 at SXSW 2016, Austin, Texas, United States.
