= Golshifteh Farahani =

Iranian actress (born 1983)

- گلشیفته فراهانی
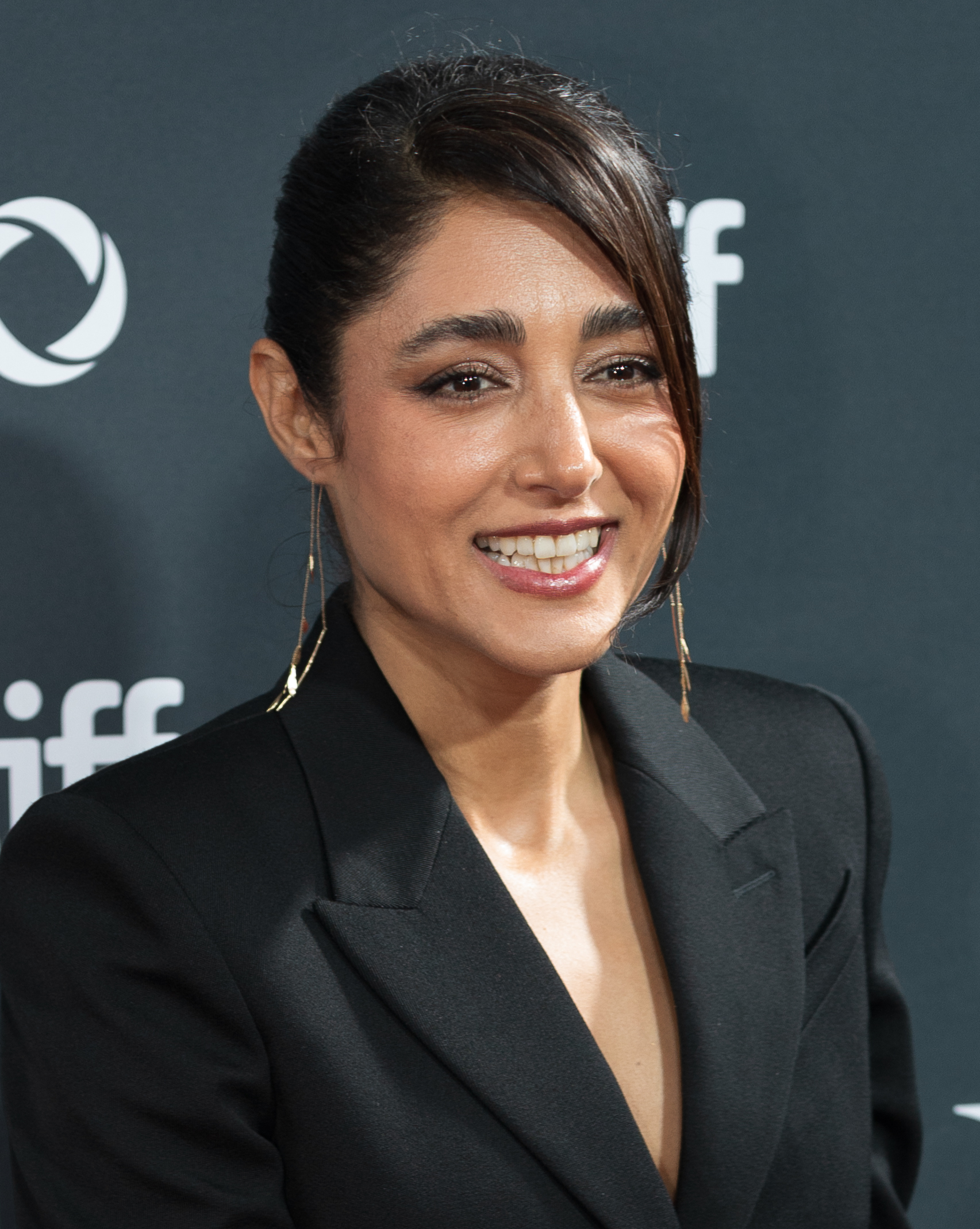
- Farahani in 2024
- Born: Rahavard Farahani; 10 July 1983 (age 43); Tehran, Iran
- Education: University of Applied Science and Technology
- Occupation: Actress
- Years active: 1996–present
- Spouse(s): Amin Mahdavi (m. 2003; sep. 2011) Christos Dorje Walker (m. 2015; sep. 2018)
- Father: Behzad Farahani
- Relatives: Shaghayegh Farahani (sister)

Rahavard Farahani (Persian: رهاورد فراهانی; born 10 July 1983), known professionally as Golshifteh Farahani (گلشیفته فراهانی), is an Iranian actress. She gained recognition for her performances in The Pear Tree (1998), which won her the Best Actress award at the Fajr International Film Festival, Half Moon (2006), which won the Golden Shell award at the 2006 San Sebastián Film Festival, and M for Mother (2006), which won her a Roshd International Film Festival award and was chosen to represent Iran in the Best Foreign Film Category of that year's Academy Awards.

She appeared in a supporting role in the American film Body of Lies (2008), which stirred controversy in Iran, making her the first Iranian in a Hollywood production since Iran's Islamic Revolution in 1979. Subsequently, she was banned from working in Iran by the Ministry of Culture and Islamic Guidance for not wearing a headscarf and eventually exiled. Since then, she had been based in Paris until November 2017, when she moved to Ibiza.

Her later work spans Iranian, European, Israeli, and American productions, including About Elly (2009), The Patience Stone (2012), for which she won a Best Actress award at the Gijón International Film Festival, and was nominated for Most Promising Actress at the 39th César Awards, and Two Friends (2015), for which she was nominated for Best Female Revelation at the 21st Lumière Awards. She has also appeared in Paterson (2016), The Song of Scorpions (2017), Girls of the Sun (2018), Extraction (2020) and its sequel (2023), as well as the television series Invasion (2021–present) and Alpha (2025). She also starred in two Israeli films directed by Eran Riklis: Shelter (2017) and Reading Lolita in Tehran (2024).

== Early life ==
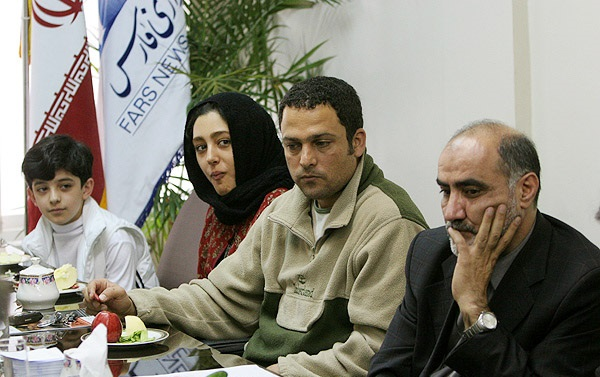
Farahani in 2006

Farahani was born in Tehran, Iran, to Behzad Farahani, a theatre director and actor, and stage actress Fahimeh Rahiminia. Her sister is actress Shaghayegh Farahani. The name Golshifteh was invented by her father and means 'loving flower', whereas her legal name is Rahavard, and means 'gift of the road'.

She began studying music and piano at the age of five, and later entered a music school in Tehran. At 14, she was cast as the lead in Dariush Mehrjui's The Pear Tree, a role for which she won the Crystal Roc for Best Actress from the International Section of the 16th Fajr International Film Festival in Tehran.

== Career ==
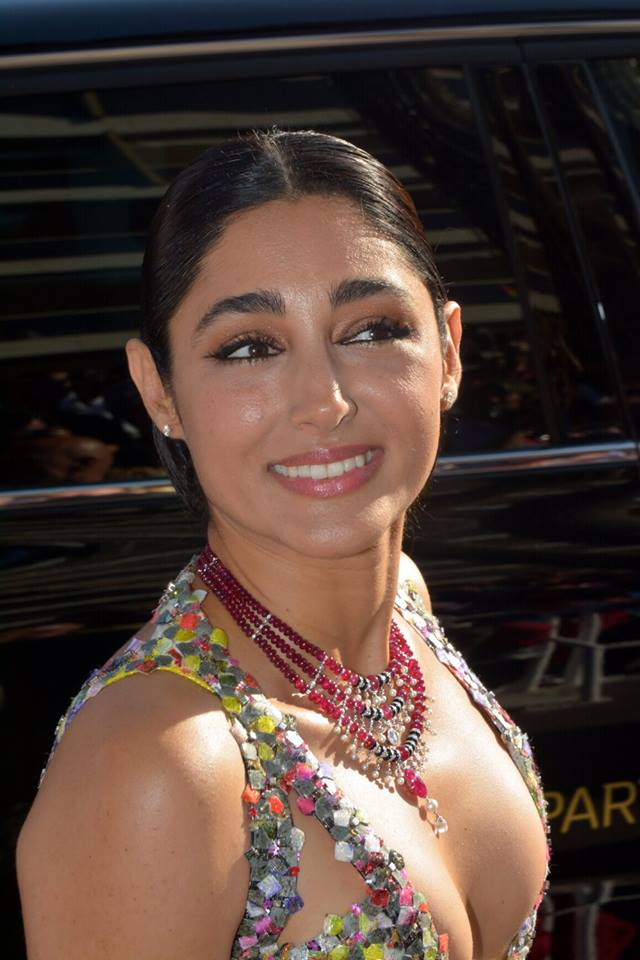
Farahani in Cannes in 2018

Farahani starred in the drama About Elly, which won Best Picture at the 2009 Tribeca Film Festival and a Silver Bear at the Berlin International Film Festival. Due to her appearance in the Hollywood movie Body of Lies, seen by Iranian authorities as a collaboration with American propaganda and a violation of Islamic law due to Farahani's appearance without hijab, she has not been allowed to return and work in Iran since 2009, and has since resided in France. Since moving to Paris, she has worked with directors Roland Joffé, Huner Saleem, Marjane Satrapi, Jim Jarmusch, Neil Burger and Julia Ducournau among others, and has been a member of the international jury at the 13th Marrakech International Film Festival, which was presided by Martin Scorsese. Farahani starred in The Patience Stone (2012), directed by Atiq Rahimi from his novel; it was favorably received by most reviewers. She also starred in a 2012 César Award video in the Most Promising Actors category.

In 2016, Farahani played Anna Karenina on stage in Paris and received laudatory reviews. She also played the lead role of Laura in director Jim Jarmusch's American feature film Paterson, opposite actor Adam Driver. The film received overwhelmingly positive reviews, scoring 96% approval on the movie site Rotten Tomatoes.

In 2017, she appeared in the fantasy film Pirates of the Caribbean: Dead Men Tell No Tales as the sea witch Shansa.

In 2020, she was in the action film Extraction as Nik Khan. In 2023, Farahani was selected as a member of the main completion jury at the 73rd Berlin International Film Festival. In 2025, she led Julia Ducournau's latest film Alpha which premiered at the 78th Cannes Film Festival.

=== Non-film work ===
Farahani is involved in environmental causes, and is an advocate for the eradication of tuberculosis in Iran.

In Iran, she was a member of Kooch Neshin (Nomads), a band that won the 2nd Tehran Avenue underground rock competition. Since leaving Iran, she has teamed up with another exiled Iranian musician, Mohsen Namjoo; their album Oy was released in October 2009.

In December 2014, she took 6th place in the annual Independent Critics Beauty List of 2014.

Farahani, who has been exiled from Iran since 2008 for refusing to wear a hijab while acting in international films, has publicly supported the Mahsa Amini protests. On 28 October 2022, British rock band Coldplay invited Farahani to perform with them a cover of Shervin Hajipour's Baraye, which has been described as "the anthem" of the protests, at the band's concert at the River Plate Stadium in Buenos Aires. The concert was broadcast live to over 3,500 theatres worldwide in more than 70 countries as part of a two-night-only live-event cinema special during the Latin America leg of the band's Music of the Spheres World Tour.

== Public image ==
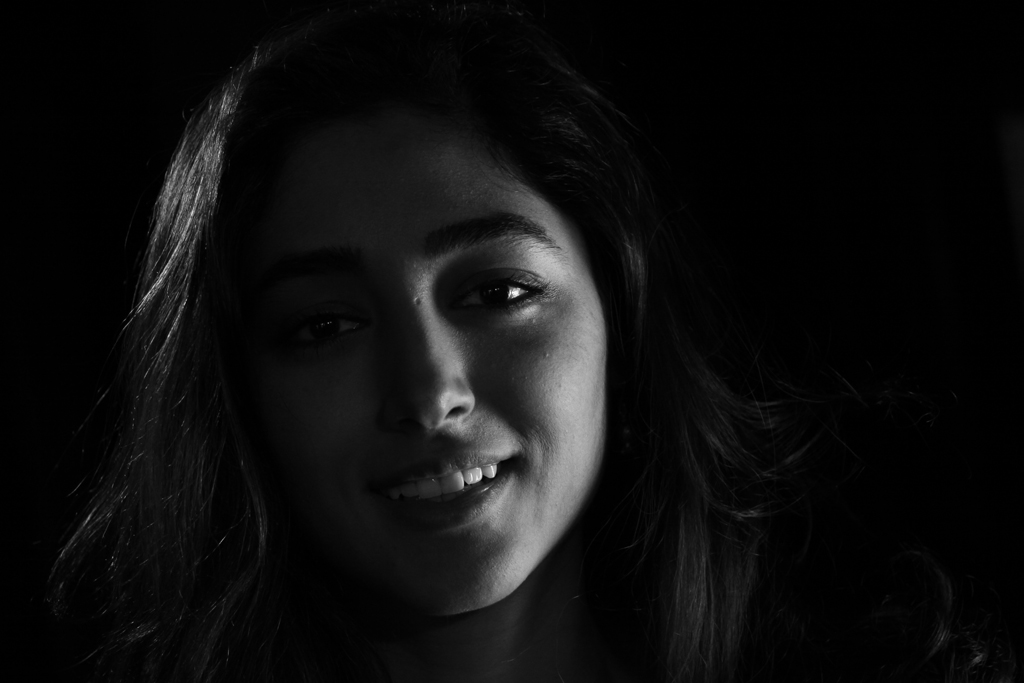
Golshifteh Farahani during an interview with BBC Persian in 2009

After Farahani's appearance in the U.S. film Body of Lies, it was reported that Iranian government authorities had prevented her from leaving Iran. This was denied by her colleagues, and she appeared at the movie's American premiere. Her last film performance in Iran was in About Elly directed by Asghar Farhadi.

In January 2012, it was reported that Farahani would not be welcome in her native Iran after posing nude in the French magazine Madame Figaro. According to Britain's Daily Telegraph, Iranian government officials told her, "Iran does not need actors or artists like you. You may offer your artistic services somewhere else." A picture from the shoot on her Facebook page initiated a lively debate about her behavior. She also appeared topless in a short black-and-white film by Jean-Baptiste Mondino called Corps et Âmes (Bodies and Souls). She also posed for fully nude photographs taken by Paolo Roversi for an Égoïste cover and editorial.

In May 2026, a scandal was reported about an alleged affair between her and the President of the French Republic, Emmanuel Macron. A correspondence between the two allegedly led to commotion between the President and his wife, the cause of which staff of the Elysee Palace has denied.

=== Criticism of Iran ===
Farahani is known for her criticism of the Iranian government, specifically addressing the restrictive policies of women's rights and artistic freedom. She has often expressed this in interviews and social media posts, talking against the country's mandatory hijab laws and the suppression of female voices in the arts. As the 2025-2026 Iranian protests erupted, she spoke about the internet blackout in Iran, stating that international coverage of the violence in Iran will enable “the Iranian people who are risking their lives for their freedom [to] feel supported and not feel their sacrifice will be in silence.”

== Personal life ==
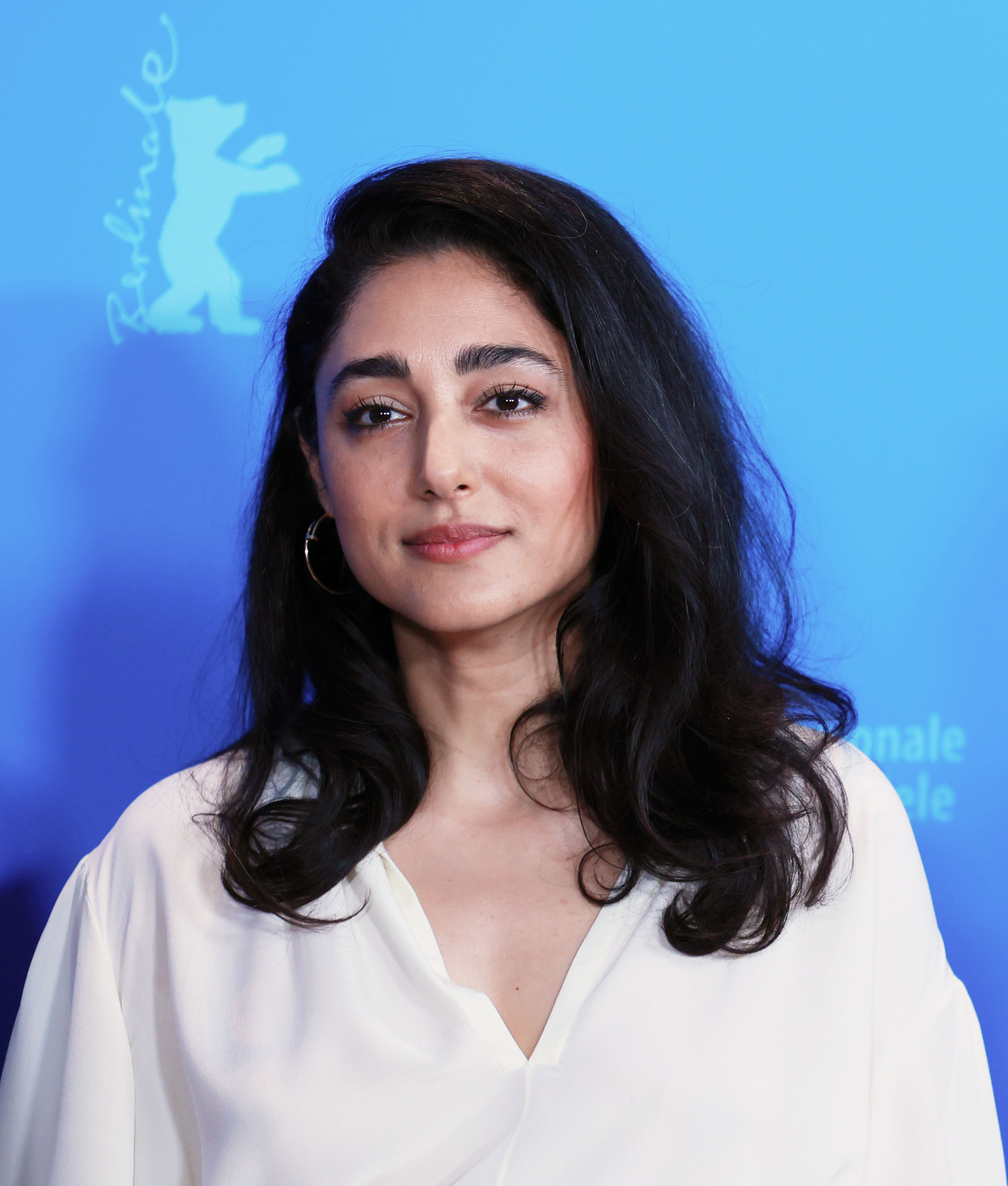
Farahani at Berlinale 2023

In 2003, Farahani married Amin Mahdavi, the brother of interior designer India Mahdavi, and from whom she later separated. She was also in a relationship with French actor Louis Garrel, who directed and co-starred with her in Two Friends (2015). In a September 2015 interview published in Grazia, Farahani revealed that she had married Christos Dorje Walker, an Australian, five months earlier.

=== Exiled from Iran ===
In 2008, before the release of Ridley Scott's Body of Lies, Farahani was placed under a travel ban. After the release, she was reportedly banned from working by the Iranian Ministry of Culture and Islamic Guidance following her appearance without a headscarf at the film's New York premiere. Upon her return to Iran, it was reported that the ayatollahs took her passport away as further punishment. When asked about being "forced into exile", Farahani suggested that the authorities initially "had no big issue" with her. However, when she wanted to travel to the U.K., her passport was seized as the authorities expressed concern that "she would be used as an Iranian symbol by the West." The judge in charge argued that authorities had to watch Body of Lies before sentencing her. Eventually, she was handed back her passport and told "she had to leave Iran as soon as possible." She fled to France after being fined around €2 million. Shortly after, she spoke out from Paris in support of the failed Iranian Green Movement and was told "not to return to Iran." In 2012, following her appearance in a short black-and-white video to promote the César Awards, where she revealed her right breast, she was exiled as a result. In November 2017, after living in Paris for eight years, she moved to Ibiza, splitting her time between there and Porto, Portugal. She had previously indicated her intent to leave France, explaining that she was severely impacted by the bureaucracy and banking system.

== Filmography ==
=== Film ===
Key
†	Denotes films that have not yet been released

Year	Title	Role	Notes
1998	The Pear Tree	Mitra	
2001	Seven Acts	Fereshteh	
2002	Zamaneh	Zamaneh	
2003	Two Angels	Azar	
2004	Somewhere Else	Raha	
2004	Boutique	Eti	
2004	The Tear of the Cold	Ronak	
2005	The Fish Fall in Love	Touka	
2005	Bab'Aziz	Noor	
2006	Gis Borideh	Maryam	
2006	In the Name of the Father	Habibeh	
2006	Half Moon	Niwemang	
2006	M for Mother	Sepideh	
2007	The Music Man	Hanieh	
2007	To Each His Own Cinema	Herself	
2008	The Wall	Setareh	
2008	There's Always a Woman in Between	Maryam	
2008	Shirin	Woman in audience	
2008	Body of Lies	Aisha	
2009	About Elly	Sepideh	
2011	If You Die, I'll Kill You	Siba	
2011	There Be Dragons	Leila	
2011	Chicken With Plums	Iran	
2012	The Patience Stone	The Woman	
2012	Just Like a Woman	Mona	
2013	My Sweet Pepper Land	Govend	
2014	Rosewater	Maryam Bahari	
2014	Eden	Yasmin	
2014	Exodus: Gods and Kings	Nefertari	
2015	Two Friends	Mona	
2015	Go Home	Nada	
2016	Sophie's Misfortunes	Madame de Réan	
2016	Finding Altamira	Conchita	
2016	Paterson	Laura	
2017	Pirates of the Caribbean: Dead Men Tell No Tales	Shansa	
2017	The Song of Scorpions	Nooran	
2017	Shelter	Mona	
2017	The Upside	Maggie	
2017	Santa & Cie	Amélie	
2018	The Night Eats the World	Sarah	
2018	Girls of the Sun	Bahar	
2019	Blind Spot	Elham	
2019	Arab Blues	Selma Derwich	
2020	Extraction	Nik Khan	
2022	Brother and Sister	Faunia Vuillard	
2022	My Father's Dragon	Dela Elevator	Voice role
2022	A Romantic Comedy	Salomé	
2023	Extraction 2	Nik Khan	
2024	Hood Witch	Nour	
2024	Schirkoa: In Lies We Trust	242B	Voice role
2024	William Tell	Suna	
2024	Reading Lolita in Tehran	Azar Nafisi	
2025	Alpha	Alpha's mother	
2026	One Minute to Midnight	Tina	
2026	Matchbox: The Movie	Robbie	
TBA	Extraction 3 †	Nik Khan	Filming
TBA	The Thing That Hurts †		Post-production

=== Television ===
Year	Title	Role	Notes
2018–2021	Gen:Lock	Yasamin 'Yaz' Madrani	Voice role
2021	VTC	Nora	Main cast (a.k.a. Surge)
2021–present	Invasion	Aneesha Malik	Main cast

=== Music video ===
Year	Song	Artist	Notes
2014	"Pola"	Jabberwocky	
2018	"Paradis"	Orelsan	

=== Theatre ===
Year	Play	Role	Notes
2003	Maryam and Mardavij	Mayan	
2004	The Black Narcissus		Workshop
2005	Mofatesh (The Inspector)	Firoozeh	Banned in Iran
2013	A Private Dream	Sarah	Toured North America (March–April 2013)
2016	Anna Karenina	Anna Karenina	Toured around France and in Paris at the Théâtre de la Tempête directed by Gaëtan Vassart

== Concerts ==
Date	Venue	Notes
10 August 2009	Sala Verdi, Milan Conservatory	With Mohsen Namjoo, presentation of the new album Oy
9 November 2009	Lido, Venice	With Mohsen Namjoo, during the Venice Film Festival
28 October 2022	River Plate Stadium, Buenos Aires	Guest appearance at Coldplay's Music of the Spheres, performed Baraye

== Awards and nominations ==
Name of the award ceremony, year presented, category, nominee of the award, and the result of the nomination
Award	Year	Category	Nominated Work	Result	Ref.
Abu Dhabi Film Festival	2012	Best Actress – New Horizons	The Patience Stone	Won	
Asia Pacific Screen Awards	2009	Best Performance by an Actress	About Elly	Nominated	
Asia Pacific Screen Awards	2013	Best Performance by an Actress	My Sweet Pepper Land	Nominated	
Asian Film Awards	2013	Best Actress	The Patience Stone	Nominated	
Asian Film Awards	2013	People's Choice for Best Actress	The Patience Stone	Nominated	
Asolo Art Film Festival	2008	Eleonora Duse Award	Herself	Won	
Chlotrudis Awards	2018	Best Supporting Actress	Paterson	Nominated	
César Awards	2014	Most Promising Actress	The Patience Stone	Nominated	
Fajr International Film Festival	1998	Best Actress – International Competition	The Pear Tree	Won	
Fajr International Film Festival	2004	Best Actress in a Leading Role – National Competition	The Tear of the Cold	Nominated	
Fajr International Film Festival	2008	Best Actress in a Leading Role – National Competition	There's Always a Woman in Between	Nominated	
Gijón International Film Festival	2012	Best Actress	The Patience Stone	Won	
Hafez Awards	2005	Best Actress – Motion Picture	The Tear of the Cold	Won	
Hafez Awards	2007	Best Actress – Motion Picture	M for Mother	Nominated	
Hafez Awards	2011	Best Actress – Motion Picture	About Elly	Nominated	
Indiana Film Journalists Association US	2016	Best Supporting Actress	Paterson	Nominated	
International Online Cinema Awards	2015	Best Actress	About Elly	Nominated	
Iran Cinema Celebration	2004	Best Actress in a Leading Role	The Tear of the Cold	Won	
Iran Cinema Celebration	2004	Best Actress in a Leading Role	Boutique	Nominated	
Iran Cinema Celebration	2005	Best Actress in a Supporting Role	The Fish Fall in Love	Nominated	
Iran Cinema Celebration	2006	Best Actress in a Leading Role	M for Mother	Nominated	
Iran Cinema Celebration	2010	Best Actress in a Leading Role	About Elly	Nominated	
Iran's Film Critics and Writers Association	2008	Best Actress in a Leading Role	The Wall	Nominated	
Kazan International Film Festival	2006	Best Actress	The Tear of the Cold	Won	
Kazan International Film Festival	2008	Best Actress	M for Mother	Won	
Kowsar Film Festival	2007	Best Actress	M for Mother	Won	
Lumière Awards	2016	Best Female Revelation	Two Friends	Nominated	
Nantes Three Continents Festival	2004	Best Actress	Boutique	Won	
Roshd International Film Festival	2007	Best Actress	M for Mother	Won	
Stony Brook Film Festival	2014	Outstanding Performance	My Sweet Pepper Land	Nominated	

== See also ==
- List of Iranian women
