= Oy (album) =

Studio album by Mohsen Namjoo
- Released: 6 October 2009
- Genre: Lo-fi, indie, alternative rock, Iranian traditional music
- Length: 56:21
- Label: Stradivarius
- Producer: Fabrica

Mohsen Namjoo chronology
Jabr-e Joghrafiyaei (2008)	Oy (2009)	Strange Times (2010)

Oy is the third studio album by the Iranian singer-songwriter Mohsen Namjoo after Toranj and Jabr-e Joghrafiyaei. Released on 6 October 2009 this was Namjoo's first album produced and published outside Iran.

This also was the first collaboration between Namjoo and Golshifteh Farahani in which Golshifteh plays piano and also sings in some parts. In addition to drums, piano and accordion other Iranian musical instruments including setar and Tonbak are played within the album.

Two Concerts were held in Italy, one in Venice on 11 September and the other in Milan on 8 October and songs of Oy album were performed with Italian instrumentalists and Golshifteh Farahani playing the piano. Both concerts were free of charge and served as a promotion for the album.

== Production ==
After leaving Iran and nearly one year living in Vienna he moved to Venice. There he got acquainted with Babak Payami, the art director of film and video section in Fabrica institute, a subset of Benetton Group. Both concerts and the album production was accomplished by the Fabrica.

"I got this chance to be acquainted with Mohsen Namjoo, a special artist above all .I think Namjoo both has made many innovations in the Persian music world and in the literature of the music and the poems. "

— Babak Payami, bbc.co.uk

== Track listing ==
1. "Hammash" – 5:16
2. "Shams" – 5:51
3. "Dela Didi" – 7:41
4. "Qashqai" – 5:55
5. "Binazir" – 8:00
6. "Khan Baji" – 7:44
7. "Cielito Lindo" – 7:36
8. "Gladiators (Faghih Khoshgele)" – 8:18

== Quran sura singing controversy ==
In 2006 the Iranian judicial system sentenced Namjoo in absentia to a five-year jail term for allegedly ridiculing the ash-Shams, a surah of the Quran, in his song "Shams". The conviction took place in spite of his formal apology. Later Namjoo claimed that he will perform an orchestral version of this song in Venice. The song was also released as part of the album.

== Allusions ==
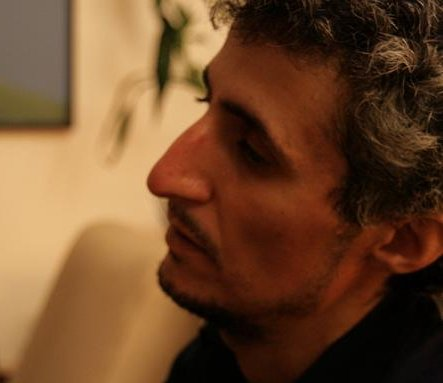
Mohsen Namjoo's songs has always caused many controversies inside Iranian society because of many uncommon and taboo use of Persian vocabulary and also a kind of frank satirical look into the society

- In final section of the first track "Hammash", parts of Cher's Bang Bang (My Baby Shot Me Down) are sung by Namjoo in an Iranian traditional music style.
- "Dela Didi" is based on the poem "Yadegar-e Khoon-e Sarv" by Hushang Ebtehaj.
- "Khan Baji" is a Kurdish song and Hesen Zîrek already had song it.
- "Qashqai" is based on the poem "Afsaneh" by Nima Yushij.1
- "Cielito Lindo" which is a popular traditional song of Mexico, written in 1882 by Quirino Mendoza y Cortés is performed by Namjoo and within it some verses of Molana and Shamloo are sung too.
- The prelude of "Gladiators" is the poem "Faghih Khoshgele" (Pretty Faqih) by Namjoo which is a satirical praise of the Supreme Leader of Iran, Ali Khamenei.
