= Drift (2013 Belgian film) =

- Directed by: Benny Vandendriessche
- Written by: Benny Vandendriessche; Dirk Hendrikx
- Produced by: Peter Krüger co-produced by Raymond van der Kaaij
- Starring: Dirk Hendrikx, Lieven Meeusen; Constantin Cojocaru
- Music by: Tom Denoyette
- Production companies: Inti Films, Belgium; Revolver, the Netherlands
- Release date: October 16, 2013 (Busan International Film Festival)
- Running time: 83 minutes
- Country: Belgium
- Languages: English, Dutch, Romanian

Drift is a 2013 Belgium art house film about a couple that waits in an empty hotel in the Romanian Carpathian mountains. The modern ruins of post-communist Romania form the backdrop for a man's quest for redemption and, possibly, punishment following his wife's death after a long illness. It is directed by Benny Vandendriessche, with the storyline conceived from the performance art by performance artist Dirk Hendrikx. The film was produced by Peter Krüger for Inti Films and Raymond van der Kaaij for Revolver Media and stars Dirk Hendrikx, Lieve Meeusen and Constantin Cojocaru in principal roles. Drift is an esoteric and somewhat opaque meditation on loss and grief.

The film had its world premiere at the Busan International Film Festival, and won the FIPRESCI award at the International Film Festival.
