= Namahn =

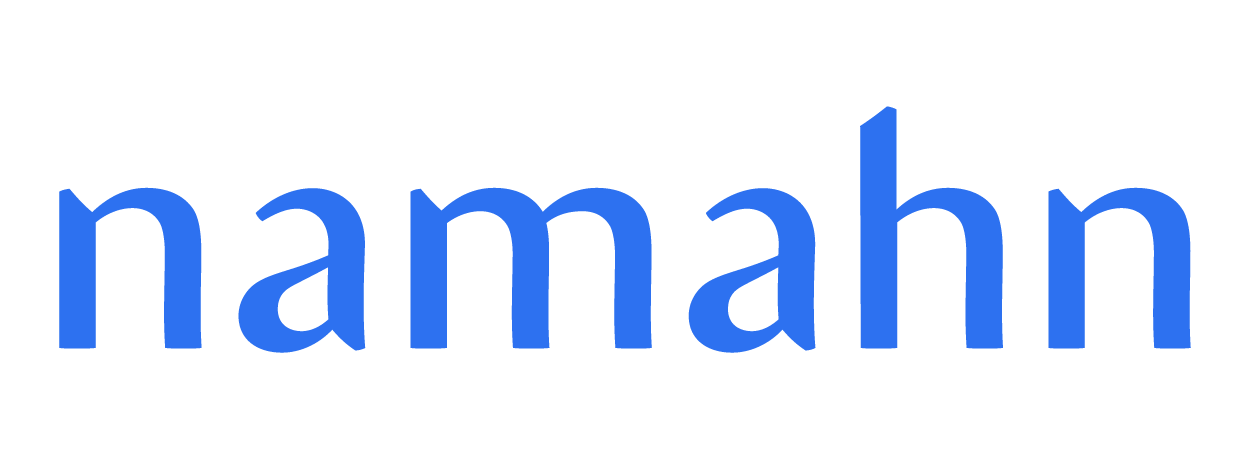
- Company type: private
- Industry: Consulting Agency
- Founded: 1987
- Founder: Joannes Vandermeulen
- Headquarters: Brussels, Belgium
- Key people: Joannes Vandermeulen, Kristel Van Ael
- Website: namahn.com

Namahn is a human-centered design consultancy based in Brussels, Belgium. Considered a pioneer in human-centered design in Belgium, Namahn is primarily active in the fields of interaction design, service design and safety-critical design.

Clients for Namahn's consultancy are mainly:

- significant Belgian companies in the financial, technology, healthcare and utilities sectors.
- multinationals with their headquarters in Belgium, active in high-tech industries and catering to a global market.
- local, regional/national and European governmental institutions.

Namahn partners Joannes Vandermeulen and Kristel Van Ael were awarded the 2016 Henry van de Velde Lifetime Achievement award for their work in digital, user experience and service design.

== Premises ==
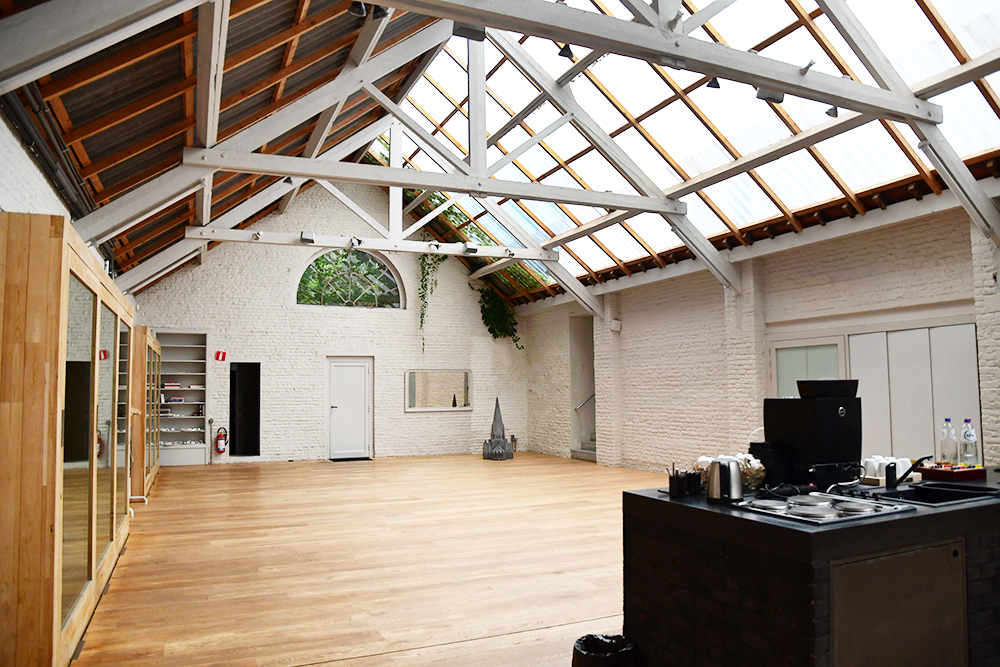
The open space, core of the premises

The original neoclassical townhouse at the front of the property dates from the 1840s, and was the home to Maison Goemaere, printers and publishers to the Belgian Court, until the early 1990s. After Namahn acquired the building, award winning Belgian architect Wim Cuyvers was in charge of two phases of renovation works that respect the integrity of the original structure while showing architecture's ability for freedom, inspiration and playfulness.

A central hangar with a huge brick stove and 90m^{2} wooden dance floor functions like a village square, with the other spaces clustered around it. These include a design studio, a small walled garden and a row of half glazed, wood-panelled cubicles that were originally the printers' offices.

The multi-stored front building hosts the main office spaces and a library, which currently serves as a meeting and workshop space.

== Outreach ==
Starting in 2003, Namahn has hosted a series of lectures by HCI practitioners and researchers on topics relevant to the HCI community. These lectures are intended to be accessible to both specialists and non-specialists. Well-known speakers include:

- Erik Hollnagel, talking about a new approach to safety management and risk assessment
- Frans de Waal, talking about why it is important for humans to understand animals
- Yvonne Rogers, talking about the assumptions that underpin calm (ubiquitous) computing
- Luc Steels, talking about how information systems can use semiotics to categorise and match information
- John Thackara, talking about how Big Data cannot track the truth within social interactions

=== Houseguests and other users ===
With so much space in the refurbished building, Namahn is happy to share it! Guests include:

- Walter Hus, a Belgian composer of contemporary classical music, has been artist in residence at Namahn since 2004. His recording studio, which is home to a Decap organ, is located in the Namahn spaces
- Axcent (an NGO promoting dialogue between the religions and beliefs in Brussels) have a free office in the Namahn spaces

A wide range of groups also use the Namahn spaces, on a regular or occasional basis. Among the regular users are a sewing class and an improvisation troupe. Performance artists (dance groups, for example) use the space for rehearsals and presentations, and professional organisations arrange lectures there.

== Research and teaching ==
Namahn is or has been involved in the following research projects:

- European Union - Artemis (funding): Astute, pro-active decision support for data-intensive environmentsNamahn is specifying the HMI and usability assessment methodology, and designing and validating the HMI for two cases of supervisory control; 2011-2014, 33 person months
- European Union - ITEA2 (funding): UsiXML, USer Interface Extensible Mark-up Language. As part of the development of an XML-based User interface Description Language, Namahn is validating the language in two cases; 2009-2012, 18 person/months (see also Information technology for European Advancement).
- Brussels Region - ISRIB (funding): HCI theory applied to critical systems. Namahn carried out methodology research consisting of a review of the literature and case studies and a consolidation of methodology components; 2006-2008, 20 person/months (see also Brussels Institute for Research and Innovation).

Namahn staff teach at many higher education institutes in Belgium and elsewhere, including:

- Antwerp Management School: Master of Management: Innovation & Entrepreneurship (postgraduate degree)
- Haute Ecole Albert Jacquard (Namur, Belgium): École Supérieure d'Infographie (bachelor's degree)
- Hogeschool Antwerpen: Product development - industrial design (master's degree)
- ISIA Firenze, Italy: industrial design (master's degree)
- KU Leuven Kortrijk: Integral Product Development (postgraduate degree)
- Sint-Lukas Brussels: Master Information Design (MIND) (master's degree)
- University of Ghent, Communication Science: New Media and Society (master's degree)
- Vrije Universiteit Brussel: Communication Science (master's degree) + New Media and Society in Europe (international master's degree)

Students often visit Namahn to attend seminars or take part in workshops in the design studio.

== Publications ==
- Service Design ‒ a toolkit for the design of public services (ISBN 9789081696807)
- Van Kerckhoven, J., Geldof, S. and Vermeersch, B. (2010) Contextual Inquiry in Signal Boxes of a Railway Organization. In Palanque, P., Vanderdonckt, J. and Winckler, M. (Eds). Human Error, Safety and Systems Development, HESSD 2009, Revised Selected papers (LNCS 5962) Berlin Heidelberg: Springer-Verlag, pp. 96–106
- Geldof, S. and Van Kerckhoven, J. (2008) Field Study Techniques for Supervisory Control Systems. In J. Drury (Ed.) Proceedings of the HCP08 workshop on Supervisory Control in Critical Systems Management. Delft, The Netherlands, June 2008
- Geldof, S. and Vandermeulen, J. (2007) A Practitioner's View of Human-Computer Interaction Research and Practice. Artifact Volume 1 Issue 3, January 2007, pp 134–141

== History ==
Namahn was founded in 1987 by Joannes Vandermeulen. Kristel Van Ael became a partner in Namahn in 2008. For five years, Namahn co-owned Integration by Design, a company Mr. Vandermeulen co-founded with Kris Vanstappen. When Mr. Vanstappen went on to found Human Interface Group in 1992 with Christel Dehaes, the company changed its name to Using It, and later to Namahn.
