= Keeping It Real Art Critics =

Web series

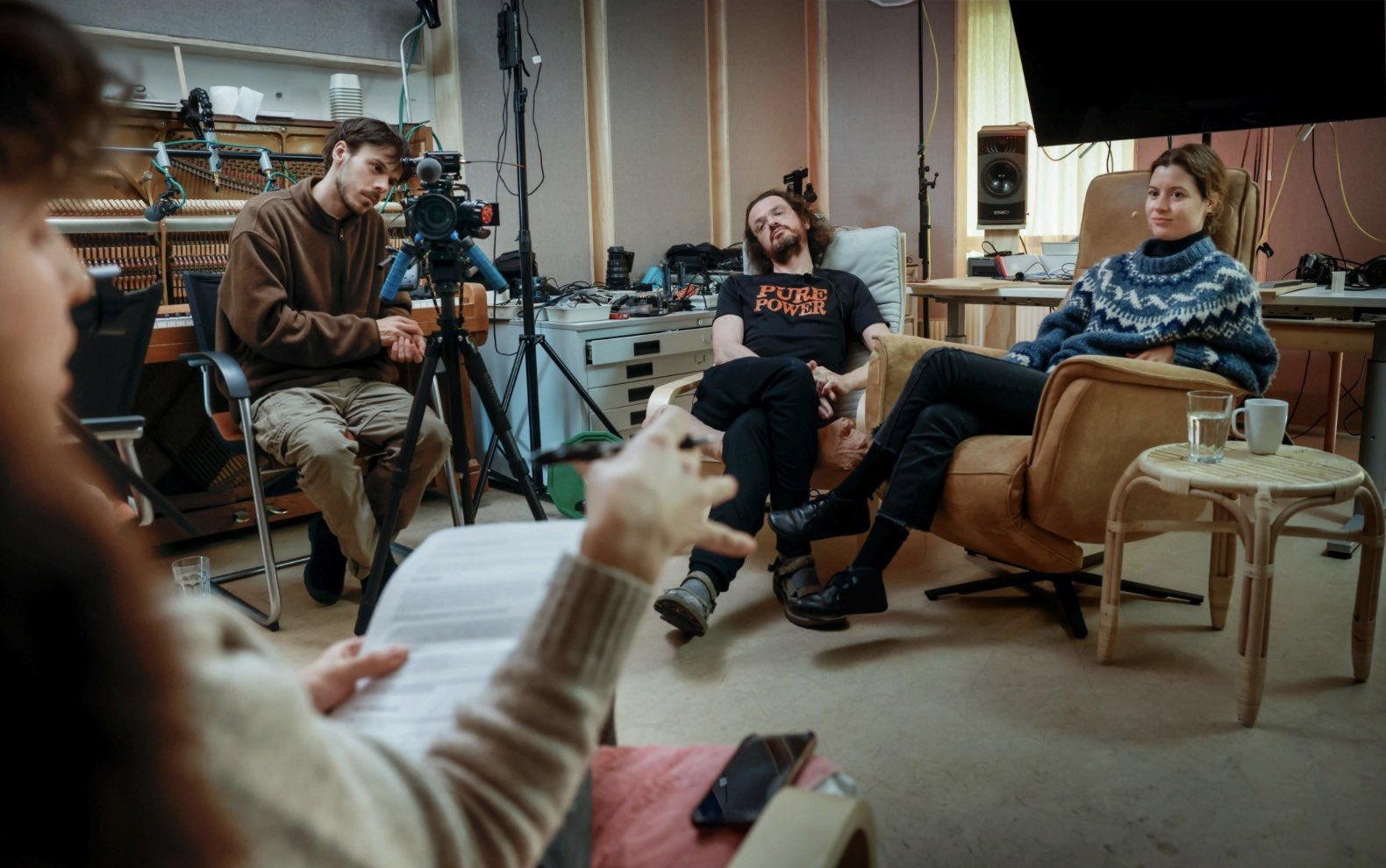
KIRAC in Amsterdam in 2024

Keeping It Real Art Critics (also known as KIRAC) is a web series on YouTube and Vimeo exploring the international art world. Directed by Stefan Ruitenbeek, a Dutch artist and director, KIRAC episodes occupy the middle ground between art and art criticism and focus mainly on the influence of modernistic, democratic principles within the art world. In the Netherlands, the platform has gained both praise and notoriety as a result of its confrontational, dialectical approach.

For a large part, KIRAC episodes consist of conversations that take place within Ruitenbeek’s personal sphere. Contributors to this dialogue, whether friends or enemies, are all said to be part of “Team KIRAC.” Because of their frequent and substantial appearances, archaeologist and philosopher Kate Sinha (1988, Deventer) and artist Tarik Sadouma (1979, Amsterdam) are often regarded as KIRAC co-directors.

== Development ==
KIRAC episodes have started appearing on YouTube since 2016. The early films can be interpreted as the result of Ruitenbeek, Sinha and Sadouma’s boredom with the modern art world and their frustration with the complacency of its representatives. They suggest (KIRAC Ep.3) that democratic, modernistic tendencies in combination with neoliberal policies have created a generation of artists who use their work to cater for the ideological preferences of curators and collectors, thereby lacking sincerity and self-reflection. The first episodes discuss various examples of this dynamic and fit within the domain of art criticism, although their quality as such is sometimes said to be undermined by the use of populist rhetoric. Others maintain that this stylistic choice is part of a thought-provoking, albeit dangerous artistic game.

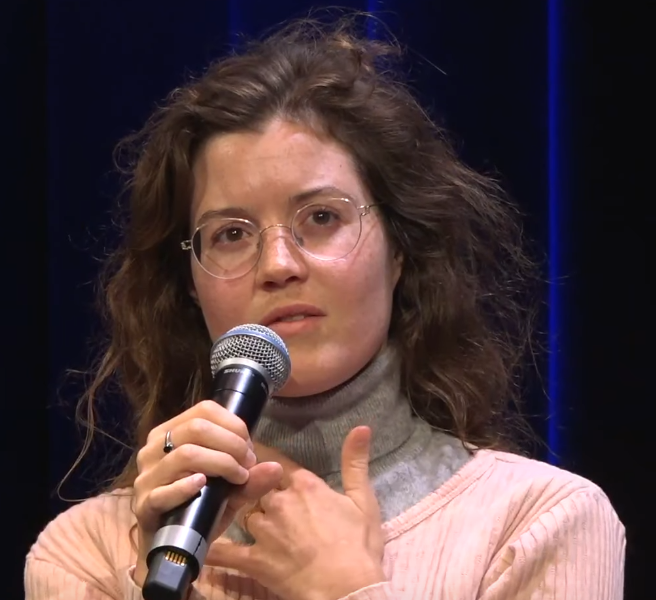
KIRAC-member Kate Sinha at De Balie (2021).

The qualification of art criticism however no longer applies to more recent releases, in which the narrative structure more and more is taking on a literary form. Shifting from critique to art, KIRAC demonstrates the constructive nature of its criticism and its wish to transform the art world by portraying it. In this regard, Ruitenbeek has explicitly talked about his “paradigm shift”, which must include artists and curators as well as art collectors. For example, KIRAC Episodes 16, 17, 18 and 19 tried to bring about a change of character with collector Philip van den Hurk, alluring his protestant, profit-minded attitude with aristocratic perspectives.

Using the art world as a stepping stone, KIRAC has also applied its critical method to more general domains of perceived political correctness, such as immigration (KIRAC Ep.14) and sexual consent (KIRAC Ep.9). Ruitenbeek:

I want to make art about the trench warfare that is going on between the left and the right. I think it is part of the world we are living in. […] They are recruiting me on the right, where they want to see me as a predator hunting for leftists. And you see the same thing happening on the left, where they say: ‘actually you’re giving great, leftist criticism of the system.’ That’s what I find attractive.

== Episodes ==
KIRAC Ep.1 ‘Verontwaardiging in De Appel’ (Indignation at De Appel)
KIRAC Ep.2 ‘Niet op deze manier’ (Not in this way)
KIRAC Ep.3 ‘De Kunstsubsidiediscussie’ (The Art Subsidy Discussion)
KIRAC Ep.4 ‘The psychology of Jon Rafman’
KIRAC Ep.5 ‘The Tears of Mara McCarthy’
KIRAC Ep.6 ‘De werken van Renzo Martens’ (also published in English: The works of Renzo Martens)
KIRAC Ep.7 ‘Indigenous Flags and Modernism’
KIRAC Ep.8 ‘The Art of Stefan Simchowitz’ (in English)
KIRAC Ep.9 ‘Who’s Afraid of Harvey Weinstein’
KIRAC Ep.10 ‘The bad breath of Mondriaan specialist Hans Janssen’
KIRAC Ep.11 ‘Medusa’
KIRAC Ep.12 ‘100% Integrity’
KIRAC Ep.13 ‘Stigma’ (the Netflix deal)
KIRAC Ep.14 ‘Problem Child’
KIRAC Ep.15 ‘Time’s Up, Old Man’
KIRAC Ep.16 ‘King Philip and the Pied Flycatcher’
KIRAC Ep.17 ‘Blackmail’
KIRAC Ep.18 ‘Parasites and Pecan Pie'
KIRAC Ep.19 'The Goat'
KIRAC Ep.20 ‘The Latent Potency of Rob Defares’ [EXTENDED VERSION]
KIRAC Ep.21 ‘Buse’ (A Good Student)
KIRAC Ep.22 ‘Reasons of Ego’
KIRAC Ep.23 ‘Honey Pot’
KIRAC Ep.24 ‘Under a Sinking Sun’
KIRAC Ep.25 ‘Male Love’
KIRAC Ep.26 ‘Cornucopia’
KIRAC Ep.27 ‘Houellebecq’
KIRAC Ep.28 ‘Faun’
KIRAC Ep.29 ‘Whore Dialectics’
KIRAC Ep.30 ‘Blasphemy Against Woman’

KIRAC Ep.31 ‘German Problems’

== Reception ==
Ever since the publication of KIRAC Ep.1 “Indignation at De Appel”, KIRAC has both been a topic of controversy and the subject of praise. In 2016, KIRAC was rejected funding by the Mondriaan Fonds, although the institution recognized the “necessity and artistic relevance” of the KIRAC discourse. The next year, however, funding was granted.

In 2018, the cancellation of a discussion about KIRAC Ep.13 at the Rietveld Academy made international headlines. The academy’s decision to withdraw the invitation was made after some outrage had arisen among its students at the announcement. Their opposition was particularly directed at Kate Sinha, who had written critically about Beatrix Ruf, curator of the Stedelijk Museum Amsterdam, and had illustrated her criticism with the example of a Zanele Muholi exhibition “where the audience was expected to be interested in the lazy works of a spoiled brat, only because she is South-African, lesbian and black.” The disinvitation was finally overturned and a new discussion was organized on the topic of the cancellation of the initial event. This discussion became the subject of KIRAC Ep.13.

As of 2023, KIRAC episodes have reached more than 1,250,000 views on YouTube.
