= The Sound of Music (disambiguation) =

The Sound of Music is a 1959 musical by Rodgers and Hammerstein.

The Sound of Music may also refer to:

== Adaptations and recordings ==
- The Sound of Music: Original Broadway Cast, 1959 original Broadway cast recording
  - "The Sound of Music" (song), title song from the 1959 musical
- The Sound of Music (film), 1965 screen adaptation of the musical
  - The Sound of Music (soundtrack), from the 1965 film (#1 selling UK album for 1965, 1966 & 1968)
- The Sound of Music (1988 cast album), with Frederica von Stade and the Cincinnati Pops Orchestra
- The Sound of Music Live!, a 2013 U.S. television production based on the original stage musical
  - The Sound of Music: Music from the NBC Television Event, studio recording by the 2013 cast
- The Sound of Music Live (2015), a UK television production based on the original stage musical

== Albums ==
- Sound of Music (album), a 1982 album by The Adicts
- The Sound of Music (The dB's album),1987
- The Sound of Music, a 2003 album by Christine Fan
- The Sound of Music by Pizzicato Five, a 1995 compilation album
- The Sound of Music (An Unfinished Symphony in 12 Parts), 1999
- The Sound of Music (Laibach album), 2018

== Songs ==
- "The Sound of Music", a song by Joy Division from the album Still (1981)
- "Sound of Music", a song by Dayton from the album Feel the Music (1983)
- "The Sound of Musik", a song by Falco from the album Emotional (1986)

== Other ==
- Sound of Music (punk club), a defunct music venue in San Francisco, California, U.S.
- Sound of Music, a retail chain founded in 1966 and renamed Best Buy in 1983
- Sound of Music Festival, an annual music festival in Burlington, Ontario

== See also ==
- The Sound of Musicals, a 2006 BBC series of musical performances
- The Sound of Silence (disambiguation)
