= Kaweh Modiri =

Kaweh Modiri (born 1982, Iran) is a Dutch-Iranian writer and filmmaker based in The Netherlands. He has written and directed the feature films Bodkin Ras (2016) and Mitra (2021), both premiered at The International Film Festival Rotterdam. He has also published the novels Mr. Sadek and The Others (2012) and Mitra (2020) with Dutch publishing house Thomas Rap.

== Early life and film career ==
Modiri was born in Iran during the Iran-Iraq war and moved to the Netherlands at age six. His half-sister Mitra was executed in Iran, which is the subject of his 2021 film with the same name.

He studied Theatre Studies at the University of Amsterdam and graduated from the Gerrit Rietveld Academy in 2010.

=== My Burglar and I (Mijn Inbreker en Ik) ===
Modiri's graduation film Mijn inbreker en ik (My Burglar and I) was based on a burglary in which stolen personal video footage was later recovered and incorporated into the work. The film premiered at IFFR in 2011 and received the René Coelho Award.

=== Bodkin Ras ===
Modiri wrote and directed his debut feature Bodkin Ras in 2016. It combines elements of fiction and documentary filmmaking by casting non-actors from Forres, a town in Scotland, in a narrative about an Iranian fugitive's integration into the local community. The film was selected for the South by Southwest Film Festival in Austin and the BFI London Film Festival and won two FIPRESCI awards at IFFR and at the Viennale and the "Making Way" Award at Netia Off Camera International Festival in Kraków, Poland, awarded by a jury consisting of Lynne Ramsay, Dick Pope, and Krzysztof Zanussi.

=== Mitra ===
His second feature, Mitra, is a 2021 political thriller co-produced by the Netherlands, Germany, and Denmark.

The film follows a Dutch-Iranian mother whose daughter was executed by the Iranian regime decades earlier. After believing she has found the woman who betrayed her in the Netherlands, she begins to stalk her and seek revenge. Mitra won the Eurimages Co-Production Development Award at Cinemart and the Special Jury Prize of the Skip City film festival in Japan.

== Writings ==
In April 2012, Modiri published his debut novel Mr. Sadek and The Others. The novel was longlisted for the Academica Literature Award. His second novel Mitra was published in 2020, the year before the film adaptation of the same name.
