= Mitra (film) =

2021 Dutch film

- Directed by: Kaweh Modiri
- Written by: Kaweh Modiri
- Starring: Jasmin Tabatabai; Mohsen Namjoo
- Cinematography: Daan Nieuwenhuijs
- Edited by: Carla Luffe
- Music by: Mohsen Namjoo
- Release date: 3 February 2021
- Running time: 107 minutes
- Country: Netherlands
- Languages: Persian, English and Dutch

Mitra is a 2021 Dutch drama film directed by Iranian-Dutch filmmaker Kaweh Modiri. The film was an adaptation of a non-fiction book by Modiri about the real-life experiences of his mother. It premiered on the International Film Festival Rotterdam. It also played at the Movies that Matter-festival in The Hague and the Netherlands Film Festival.

== Plot ==
The daughter of Haleh was betrayed and executed in the aftermath of the Iranian Revolution. 37 years later, in the Netherlands, she is confronted by the woman who betrayed her daughter.

== Cast ==
- Jasmin Tabatabai as Haleh
- Mohsen Namjoo as Mohsen
- Shabnam Toloui
- Avin Manshadi as Nilu
- Sallie Harmsen as Clara
- Dina Zarif as Mitra
- Aram Ghasemy as Parisa
