= Trust the Tangerine Peel =

Studio album by Mohsen Namjoo
- Released: May 28, 2014
- Genre: World music, Persian contemporary music
- Length: 64:20
- Label: Daf-Daf Production
- Producer: Mammad Zadeh

Mohsen Namjoo chronology
13/8 (2012)	Trust the Tangerine Peel (2014)

Trust the Tangerine Peel (in Persian: از پوست نارنگی مدد, Az Poost-e Narengi Madad) is the 7th official (his 5th released outside Iran) studio album by Iranian singer-songwriter Mohsen Namjoo. It was released on May 28, 2014. The album is a mixture of original and cover songs using both contemporary and classical Persian poetry. At times, Namjoo attempts to juxtapose or fuse Persian and popular western styles of music, particularly in "Roo Dast" (Eric Clapton's acoustic "Layla") and "Golmammad" (Led Zeppelin's "Whole Lotta Love"). Some suggest that "Golmammad" is an homage to Gol Mohammad, the hero of the story of Kelidar, written by the notable Iranian writer, Mahmoud Dolatabadi. However, in interviews, Namjoo has stated that "Golmammad" has been based on a traditional song from Sabzevar and that he didn't have the hero of Kelidar in mind at the time of writing it. The song "Adam-e Pooch" is a cover version of "Nahang" (The Whale) by the late Ebrahim Monsefi, an Iranian musician and singer from Bandar Abbas, Iran.

Namjoo dedicated the album to his brother, Mahmoud Namjoo: To his art filled with respect for life.

== Title ==
The title of the album suggests the possibility of drawing inspiration and strength from an ordinary object like a tangerine. The song "Narengi" (Persian for tangerine) makes a reference to the album name and morphs its way from a traditional Sufi song rooted in the Magham music of Torbat-e Jam (Namjoo's birthplace) crying "O God, Help me, Sheikh Ahmad-e Jami, Help me," to Namjoo's own words praising a tangerine.

== Track listing ==
1. "Reza Khan" – 5:00
  - Lyrics: Namjoo
  - Dedicated to Abbas Milani
2. "Roo Dast (Layla)" – 6:33
  - Based on "Layla" by Eric Clapton and Jim Gordon
  - Lyrics by Namjoo and Masoud Gharashpour
3. " Adame Pooch" – 6:51
  - Based on "Nahang" (The Whale) by Ebrahim Monsefi
4. " Man Mast" – 8:30
  - Based on "Twist in My Sobriety" by Tanita Tikaram
5. "Narengi (Khorassani)" – 8:56
  - Lyrics: Namjoo
  - Based on the traditional Sufi text from Torbat Jam
6. "Abr Agar" – 2:15
  - Based on folk song from Khorasan
7. "Darda" – 7:37
  - Lyrics: Arezoo Khosravi and Namjoo
  - Selected verses from Rumi
  - Dedicated to Bahram Beyzai
8. " Baroon" – 5:04
  - Lyrics: Akhavan-e Sales
9. "Golmammad" – 5:07
  - Based on "Whole Lotta Love" by Led Zeppelin
  - Lyrics: Traditional song from Sabzevar
10. "Hichi" – 8:35
  - Lyrics: Namjoo

== Personnel ==
- Greg Ellis – Percussion
- Kasra Saboktakin - Bass Guitar
- Siamack Sanaie – Acoustic guitar
- Jimmy Mahlis – Electric and
- Mohammad Talani – Electric and Acoustic guitar
- Saba Alizadeh – Kamanche
- Mohsen Namjoo – Setar, Vocals
- Mammad Zadeh – Percussion (on "Baroon")

== Production ==
- All compositions by: Mohsen Namjoo
- All Arrangements by: Mohsen Namjoo and Mammad Zadeh
- Music Produced by: Mammad Zadeh
- Mastering by: Bob Katz
- Graphic Design: Reza Abedini
- Production Sponsor: Shari Rezai

== Controversies ==
The song "Reza Khan" talks about Reza Shah, the founder of the Pahlavi dynasty. Namjoo's lyric refers to Reza Khan as an "opium addict, with a bad temper who killed his enemies and brought modernity to Iran." This angered the Iranian pro-monarchists who flooded Namjoo's Facebook page with obscenities against Namjoo.
