= The Minister =

2011 film

- Film poster
- Directed by: Pierre Schoeller
- Written by: Pierre Schoeller
- Produced by: André Bouvard
- Starring: Olivier Gourmet; Michel Blanc; Zabou Breitman
- Cinematography: Julien Hirsch
- Edited by: Laurence Briaud
- Distributed by: Diaphana
- Release dates: 21 May 2011 (Cannes); 21 October 2011 (France); 2 November 2011 (Belgium)
- Running time: 115 minutes
- Countries: France; Belgium
- Language: French
- Budget: $6.5 million
- Box office: $6.9 million

The Minister (French: L'Exercice de l'État) is a 2011 French-Belgian political drama film directed by Pierre Schöller.

== Plot ==
French Transport Minister Bertrand Saint-Jean arrives at the scene of a serious bus crash with many fatalities. He later attends a news interview where he is asked about the government's plans to privatize some train stations as part of a budget reform. Bertrand is supposed to be a major facilitator of this reform, but neither he nor his friend and assistant Gilles approve the plan. Popular opinion also disapproves of the privatization.

However, Bertrand doesn't want to oppose the Prime Minister. While his staff oppose the reform, Bertrand hopes the President will provide a watered-down reform to end popular protest. The Prime Minister promises the first step will only consist of five secondary train stations. Bertrand suffers so much from pressure that he has a nightmare in which he commits suicide after reading the five stations are the most prestigious in all of France.

Finally, when Bertrand thought all his staff would abandon him, Gilles ensures him he will stay to help Bertrand negotiate the reform into something acceptable.

In the end, the President intervenes himself to arbitrate. But contrary to Bertrand's hopes, he has no intention of softening the reform. Bertrand clearly noticed that he has no say in the reform details; his mission is to implement them to the letter while reassuring opponents. Even worse, the Prime Minister and President have already selected a new generation of assistants for Bertrand in this mission, explicitly ordering Gilles to be fired.

Bertrand silently accepts these orders. The film ends as he walks out of the President's office hiding how heartbreaking these orders are.

== Cast ==
- Olivier Gourmet as Bertrand Saint-Jean, Minister of Transport
- Michel Blanc as Gilles
- Zabou Breitman as Pauline
- Sylvain Deblé as Martin Kuypers
- Didier Bezace as Dominique Woessner
- Jacques Boudet as Senator Juillet
- François Chattot as Falconetti, Minister of Health
- Gaëtan Vassart as Loïk
- Arly Jover as Séverine Saint-Jean
- Eric Naggar as the French Prime Minister
- Anne Azoulay as Josepha
- Abdelhafid Metalsi as Louis-Do
- Christian Vautrin as Nemrod
- François Vincentelli as Peralta, Minister of Budget
- Stéphan Wojtowicz as the French President

== Accolades ==
It premiered in the Un Certain Regard section at the 2011 Cannes Film Festival where it won the Un Certain Regard FIPRESCI Award. It received four Magritte Award nominations, winning three, including Best Foreign Film in Coproduction and Best Actor for Olivier Gourmet.
