= Gaëtan Vassart =

Belgian actor (born 1978)

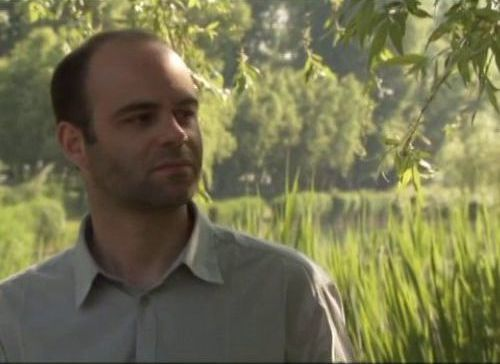
- Born: Brussels (Belgium)
- Occupations: Actor; Theatre director

Gaëtan Vassart is a theatre director, author and actor born in 1978 in Brussels, Belgium.

== Biography ==
Author, director and actor born in Brussels in 1978, Gaëtan Vassart is Belgian and French graduated from INSAS, and from National Conservatory of Dramatic Art in Paris. In 2016, Gaëtan Vassart directed on stage Golshifteh Farahani in Anna Karenina by Leo Tolstoy. In 2018, he directed Miss Julie by August Strindberg. Gaëtan Vassart worked as an actor in short and feature films, notably Pierre Schoeller (THE MINISTER, FIF Cannes 2011), Jean-Xavier de Lestrad, Thierry de Peretti. Gaëtan Vassart co-wrote with Jean-Claude Carrière the feature film CECILE AND HE GROCER. In 2022, he directed with Sabrina Kouroughli the short film LOST, produced by Haïku films. The film is selected at São Paulo International Short Film Festival, CINEXPOSÉ FILM FESTIVAL - Festival de Cine de Terror Independiente de Nueva York (USA, 2023) and the Seoul International short Film Festival among other festivals.

== Cinema ==
=== Director ===
- 2022: Lost, short film.

=== Actor ===
- 2009: Trois chambres, court-métrage de Chloé Thomas/ Le GREC, rôle de l'homme
- 2009: Parcours meurtrier d'une mère ordinaire, la fille du silence de Jean-Xavier de Lestrade, Jean-Louis Courjault
- 2011: Kings, court-métrage de Deniz Gamze Ergüven, Prize Emergence, l'émeutier.
- 2011: L'Exercice de l'État, long-métrage de Pierre Schöller, sélection Un certain regard FIF Cannes 2011, Loïk
- 2015: Malaterra - SAISON 1 Jean-Xavier de Lestrade et Laurent Herbiet, Kevin Costa

== Theatre ==
=== Director ===
- 2001: The imaginary invalid from Molière, House of Portugal André de Gouveia, International city Universitaire of Paris
- 2012: Bear skin written and directed by Gaëtan Vassart, at Maison de la Radio-Paris, with Anne Alvaro.
- 2014: Toni M. written and directed by Gaëtan Vassart, with Bernard Sobel, Festival d’Avignon, Théâtre des Halles, Chapelle Saint-Claire. ( Chartreuse of Villeneuve–Lez-Avignon )
- 2015: Danser written and directed by Gaëtan Vassart, Comédie de Picardie, Scène nationale of Marne-La-Vallée.
- 2016: Anna Karénine ( the bals where I have fun doesn’t exist for me anymore) from Tolstoï, adaptation and directing by Gaëtan Vassart, Théâtre de la Tempête in the Cartoucherie de Vincennes (Eastern Paris) and on tour, with Golshifteh Farahani
- 2018: Miss Julie August Strindberg, La Ménagerie de Verre-Paris, Comédie de Picardie.
- 2019: Bérénice, Jean Racine, La Manufacture des Oeillets, Dramatic National Center of Ivry

==== Actor ====
- 2003: Immortality from Peter Handke, m.s. Joël Jouanneau, Théâtre Ouvert
- 2003: Pseudolus from Plaute, directed by Brigitte Jaques-Wajeman|Brigitte Jaques, Auditorium of Louvre
- 2004: Murder of the Jew princess from Armando Llamas, directed by Philippe Adrien, Théâtre de la Tempête, Piccolo Teatro (Milan)
- 2004: The funny knowledge, directed by Gilberte Tsaï, Centre dramatique national de Montreuil
- 2004: Yvonne, queen of Bourgogne from Witold Gombrowicz, directed by Philippe Adrien, Théâtre du Conservatoire
- 2005: Comedy of mistakes from Shakespeare, directed by Marc Feld, Théâtre national de Chaillot
- 2005: Winter tales from Shakespeare, directed by Pauline Bureau, Théâtre du Ranelagh
- 2006: Dons, Mécènes et Adorateurs, by Ostrovski, directed by Bernard Sobel, Théâtre de Gennevilliers, Théâtre du Nord
- 2006: Pœub! de Serge Valletti, directed by Michel Didym, Théâtre des Célestins, Théâtre de la Criée, Théâtre national de la Colline
- 2007: The death of Zand from Iouri Olecha, directed by Bernard Sobel, La Colline, Théâtre national de Strasbourg
- 2008: The holidays of Mister Hulot revisited, from Jean-Claude Carrière, directed by L. Shroeder, Cinémathèque du Luxembourg
- 2009: The stone de Marius von Mayenburg, directed by Bernard Sobel, Théâtre de Dijon Bourgogne
- 2010: The stone de Marius von Mayenburg, directed by Bernard Sobel, Théâtre national de la Colline, Théâtre du Nord
- 2010: Amphitryon (Kleist) Amphitryon de Heinrich Von Kleist, mise en scène Bernard Sobel, MC 93 Bobigny
- 2013: House cleaner from Markus Orth, directed by. Sarah Capony, Théâtre 13,
- 2013: Hannibal de Grabbe, from Bernard Sobel, Théâtre national de Strasbourg, T2G, CADO, Théâtre de la Liberté
- 2014: Toni M., written and directed by Gaëtan Vassart, collaboration art. Bernard Sobel, festival Avignon, rôle : Toni Musulin
- 2016: Le Cid, Corneille, directed by Yves Beaunesne, Comédie Poitou-Charentes

== Selections/ Awards ==
Lost directed by Gaëtan Vassart and Sabrina Kouroughli (Haïku Films, 15')

- 33rd São Paulo International Short Film Festival (Sāo Paulo ISFF 2022)
- 14th Seoul International Extreme-short Image & Film Festival (SESIFF 2022)
- Barcelona's XXXIV Sants Fantasy and Horror Film Marathon (Spain, 2022)
- Mexico's International Festival of Independent Art and Cinema (MIAX), 2022
- 23rd Pontault-Combault International First film Festival (France, 2022)
- Special Mention Awards- 11th New Delhi International Short Film Festival (ISFF, 2022)
- AQP Audiovisual y Cine Festival (Arequipa, Perú, 2022)
- Tbilisi 3rd Diogenes International Short Film Festival (Georgia, 2022)
- Sevilla's Akida International Film Festival (Spain, 2023)
- 6th Venezuela International Film Festival Fescilmar, 2022
- Festival WomenTime! II International Women's Film Festival of the Canary Islands.
- 13° Festival Internacional de Cine Terror de Valparaiso (Chile, 2022)
- Film Festival Internacional Amity (AIFF, India, 2022)
- CINEXPOSÉ FILM FESTIVAL - Festival de Cine de Terror Independiente de Nueva York (USA, 2023)
