= Stefan Simchowitz =

Film producer, collector, and art dealer

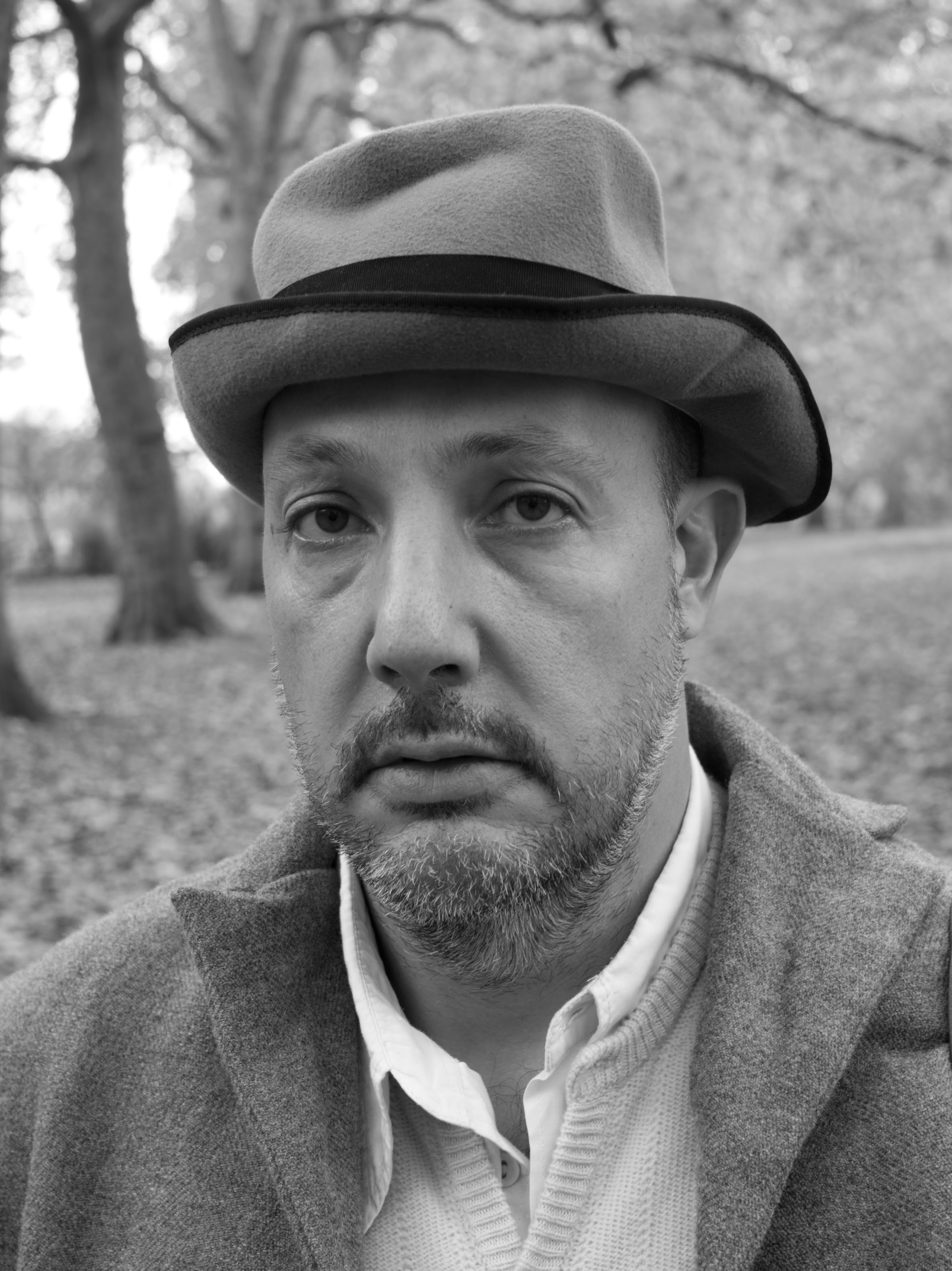
- Simchowitz in 2015
- Born: October 8, 1970 (age 55); Johannesburg
- Occupations: art collector, art curator, advisor
- Years active: 1995–present
- Political party: Republican
- Partner: Rosi Riedl
- Website: Simchowitz

Stefan Simchowitz (born October 8, 1970) is a Los Angeles-based art collector, art curator, and art advisor. He is a vocal proponent of social media as a legitimate way of discovering, distributing, and popularizing the fine arts, primarily using Facebook and Instagram as platforms for self-promotion, discovering new artists, and endorsing those he already manages.

== Early life and education ==
Simchowitz spent his early years in South Africa, but otherwise lived a mobile childhood. He graduated from Stanford University with a bachelor's degree in economics, finishing his degree in three years. Shortly after, he attended the American Film Institute in Los Angeles. Simchowitz would go on to produce and assistant produce fifteen films.

== Career ==
Simchowitz believes that conversations on social media hold a degree of influence over the artworld comparable to other canonical forums for artistic discussion and legitimization, including art reviews written by critics for key publications. Supporters see his method as concerned with diversifying the number of systems which recognize and produce credible artists. A number of them, including, but not limited to Sterling Ruby, Oscar Murillo, Paa Joe, Lucien Smith, Petra Cortright, Zachary Armstrong, Kour Pour, Jon Rafman, and Marc Horowitz have all been advised by Stefan Simchowitz. In November 2015, he was ranked No. 95 in Art Review Magazine's POWER 100, a list of 2015's "most influential people in the contemporary artworld."

Stefan Simchowitz engages in a hybrid practice that includes art dealing, art advising and art collecting. He believes that "the alchemy of art is that it’s not just the artist who produces the work but the spectator and the audience that essentially refines the art in its raw state into a refined product." As such, once he discovers a young, talented, generally unknown artist with whom to work, he sets about generating a market for them and their work, building demand, which eventually drives up prices. This part of his practice functions not unlike that of an art gallery. In the meantime, Simchowitz provides a patron-like role for the artist, providing them with the finances needed to live, maintain a full-time studio and produce work. He believes that the artist must be committed to their creative work on a full-time basis and that financial hardship, as well as the need to make ends meet, can be detrimental to the challenge of making good art. However, in exchange for footing the bill, Simchowitz buys any new work at a discount.

Simchowitz gained attention when a 2014 Bloomberg article about speculation in the contemporary art market reported on his purchase on-the-cheap of 34 paintings by the Colombian artist Oscar Murillo near the beginning of his career in the early 2000s, paying as low as US$1,500 for some canvases. Since then, between 2012 and 2014, the value of a Murillo work surged by nearly 3,000 percent. In the current auction climate, a typical piece by the artist can command as much as US$400,000 at auction. However, Simchowitz rarely sells the work which he collects, and currently sits on a collection of over 1,500 contemporary works that he values personally at around US$30 million, with "five percent of the works accounting for fifty percent of the value."

In addition to dealing and collecting, Simchowitz also works as an art advisor. He serves a roster of clients whom he advises about the acquisition of contemporary art, offering advice, not only on works produced by artists under his representation, but also on art outside his immediate reach (pieces typically for sale at galleries and auction houses).

Simchowitz is a noted photographer, describing his work as "The Simcoportrait". The Simcoportrait is a self created genre of photography in which he has collapsed documentation of anything and everything into a single thing - this includes still life, landscape, street, self portraiture, and documentation photography. The Simcoportrait is merely a portrait of the subject in whatever genre of photography it may fall. What is unusual about his practice is that it accompanies him everywhere as a live documentation under the seemingly nondescript amateur everyday photographer. There is a formal discipline to his image taking and image making that is reflected in the obsessive compulsion to capture and create. Simchowitz's "Simcoportraits" have been published in Flaunt and Vogue.

On March 6, 2021, Simchowitz opened his first art gallery under his namesake, Simchowitz.com.

== Other ventures ==
=== Producer ===
After college, Simchowitz started a film production company responsible for a number of feature films and shorts, such as Darren Aronofsky's drama, Requiem for a Dream.

==== Filmography ====
- The Farewell (2011)
- Lula (2007)
- The Wild (2006)
- Till Human Voices Wake Us (2002)
- Slap Her... She's French (2002)
- Requiem for a Dream (2000)
- The Love Letter (1999)
- Coming Soon (1999)
- Guinevere (1999)
- Judas Kiss (1998)
- Starstruck (1998)
- The Alarmist (1997)
- Little City (1997)
- The House of Yes (1997)
- Johns (1996)
- The Chili Con Carne Club (1995)

==== MediaVast ====
In 1999, Simchowitz co-founded the visual content provider MediaVast. Later in 2007, Getty Images acquired the company for a reported US$207 million. At the time of the sale, the repository held approximately 8.5 million images.

=== 2024 United States Senate Campaign ===
In October 2023, Simchowitz declared his candidacy for the 2024 United States Senate election in California as a centrist Republican. He primarily campaigned on homelessness and his belief that printing more currency would allow everyone to live comfortably. He admitted that he had low chances of winning, this was proved true as he finished 25th out of 31 candidates in the blanket primary with 0.1% of the vote.

== Controversy ==
Simchowitz is a target for critics, claiming that his particular penchant for promoting young, undiscovered artists through bulk acquisitions of their work to later flip for profit, destabilizes established workings of the art world — age-old, value-determining systems composed of a long-standing and tight network of critics, publications, universities, museums and galleries that collectively define the nature of 'good' art. He subverts the establishment by selling his curated acquisitions directly to a diverse network of wealthy clients who trust his taste.

In the media, he has received both ample praise and heavy criticism. He has been called the Michael Milken of the art world, and "a Sith Lord from the Brotherhood of Darkness," by Jerry Saltz. Art Review's entry on Simchowitz states that "if the artworld needed its Howard Stern, its Ari Gold, its Donald Trump, it got 'Simcho': a brash, publicity-hungry yet highly intelligent collector-adviser-dealer...". Andrew M. Goldstein of Artspace argued that "his approach to collecting and nurturing artists systematically abrogates—annihilates—a whole series of beliefs that lie at the foundation of the art world's critical, institutional, and commercial structures." Simchowitz's trademark transparent and honest attitude leads some to believe that he is simply lifting the veil off of previously hidden activities already prevalent in the artworld. Marc Spiegler, director of Art Basel, attributes Simchowitz's success to the fact that he does exactly what the galleries do, except at a significantly faster clip, and that "he has taken a market that was built on opacity and been much more transparent. He goes to an artist's studio; he puts the stuff on Instagram." Spiegler characterizes Simchowitz's practice as similar in function to galleries of past, in that he holds exclusive access to his collector base. As such, the approach has been characterized as paradigm-shifting in the context of the contemporary art artworld, while snuggly fitting into an extended historical lineage of the art world's many businessmen.

In 2013, along with Dublin gallerist Ellis King, Simchowitz sued Ghanaian artist Ibrahim Mahama. Mahama had been paid by the dealers, but refused to authenticate derivative works they produced from Mahama's installations of Ghanaian coal sacks. In 2016, Simchowitz settled with Mahama.

In 2017 the Dutch art collective Keeping It Real Art Critics published a documentary about Simchowitz under the disguise of being a German television crew.
