= Bobby Fogel =

Belgian architect

- Betsalel Hillel Fogel
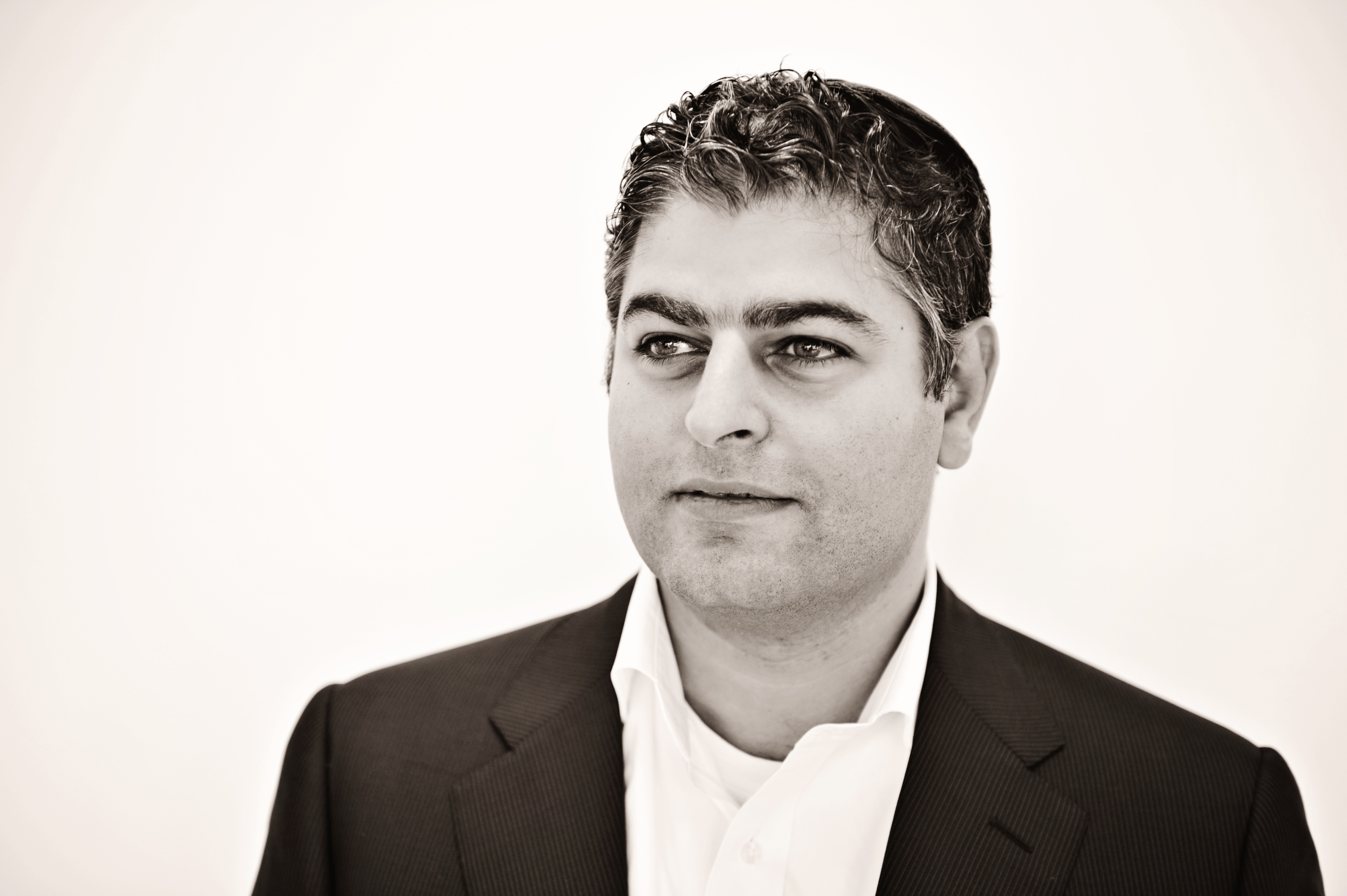
- Born: May 21, 1974 (age 50)
- Education: Vrije Universiteit Brussel
- Occupation: Architect
- Years active: 1995–present

Bobby Fogel (born Betsalel Hillel Fogel, 21 May 1974) is a Belgian architect, founder, and creative partner of Antwerp-based architecture firm BF Architecture.

== Biography ==
Bobby Fogel was born in Elsene, Brussels in 1974.

From 1993 to 2000, he completed his studies at the Vrije Universiteit Brussel (VUB; 'Free University of Brussels'), where he earned a Bachelor's and a Master's degree in Science Engineering of Architecture.

In 1995 Fogel Started his career as an intern at Rem Koolhaas’ Architecture firm OMA in Rotterdam, The Netherlands. In 1999, he assisted as an intern at the Oscar Niemeyer Studio in Rio de Janeiro, Brazil. He undertook an internship at Eisenman Architects in New York from 2000 to 2001. In 2001, he served as an advisor architect at Richard Meier & Partners Architects in New York. From 2002 to 2007, Fogel assumed the role of a junior architect at Montois Partners Architects in Brussels, Belgium.

Fogel founded BF Architecture in 2008.

His architecture is distinguished by implementing the Genius Loci resulting in an “architecture parlante”. His firm works as a post-academic institutional workshop where accommodation is often offered in the in-house dormitory for passionate interns. The remarkable results of the progress of the students have built a great reputation among universities.

In 2014, his project took second place in the Liget Budapest Museum of Ethnography Competition.

He participated in the Venice Performance Art Week and Venice Biennale of Architecture in 2016 in a collateral exhibition.

In 2017 Fogel received the Build Architecture Award: Best Multi-Family Architecture Practice – Europe as well as Best Residential Building Project: 1621-building.

In 2018, he was published in the book “30 of the Most Relevant World Architects” and his company won EU Business News Magazine's EU Business Awards 2018, as well as Leading Adviser Awards as a Leading Architecture and Design Firm of the Year in Belgium. Also in 2018, BF Architecture was listed in Lawyer International Legal 100 – Best Architect in Optimizing Codex in Architecture.

In 2019, he was awarded the Arte Firenze Premio Leonardo da Vinci. In the same year, his company received the Global Business Insight Awards as Most Innovative Architecture Company 2019 in Belgium and was acclaimed as one of the top Flemish Master Architect from Discover Benelux magazine.

He is an active guest speaker and participant in jury panels, including A’ Design Award, Frame Awards, Eurasian Challenge, AICA Artists In Concrete Awards, India Mumbai.

== Works ==
- The New Athletic Stadium of Brasilia.
- The Crystal Forest Landmark in Antwerp
- Fort Intemporal – a redevelopment project of a former 19th-century fortress a few miles from the centre of Venice. Together with artist Wendy Krohmal.
