= Arash Sedighi =

Arash Sedighi is an Iranian-British filmmaker and screenwriter based in Northern England. His narrative work primarily explores themes of immigration, childhood, and the refugee experience.

== Early life and education ==
Born in Iran, Sedighi's family fled the Iran-Iraq War in 1986. They eventually relocated to Malmö, Sweden, when Sedighi was four years old. Prior to his filmmaking career, he earned a PhD from the School of Oriental and African Studies (SOAS), University of London.

== Career ==
Sedighi's cinematic projects frequently draw on his background and personal experiences as a refugee. He wrote and directed the 2025 semi-autobiographical short film Holding Onto Home, which follows a young Iranian boy adjusting to a new school in the United Kingdom. The 14-minute project was selected for the 2025 Norwich Film Festival and was an official selection at the Manchester Film Festival.

His other directorial work includes the 2026 narrative short I Will Meet You There, produced by Kardar Studios. Additionally, Sedighi co-wrote White Privilege, a dark comedy short designed to challenge traditional casting norms within British genre films.
