= Paul Rhoads (artist) =

Paul Rhoads (born 1956) is an American painter, author, and essayist who has lived and worked in France since 1990.

== Early life and education ==
Born in New York, Rhoads grew up in an artistic household. His father, George Rhoads (1926–2021), was a painter and sculptor best recognized for his large-scale, audiokinetic ball machines displayed in public venues globally.

Rhoads attended The New York Studio School, The Boston Museum School, The Art Students League of New York, and The New York School of Visual Arts. During this period, he studied under Mercedes Matter, Esteban Vicente, Herbert Katzman and Aaron Kurzen, a disciple of Marcel Duchamp.

== Career ==
=== Painting and writing ===
Drawing on 18th-century French aesthetics, Rhoads paints in a classical, figurative style. He dedicates most of his canvas work to expansive historical and religious scenes. Expanding his focus to art theory, he published Art in the Age of Anxiety, a book exploring the historical foundations of artistic Modernism and contemporary art.

=== Vance Integral Edition ===
Beyond his own painting, Rhoads led a literary preservation effort starting in 1999. As the creator and editor-in-chief of the Vance Integral Edition (V.I.E.), he oversaw a project to compile and publish a definitive, 44-volume bibliography of science fiction author Jack Vance. To accompany the text, Rhoads provided original engravings and drawings to illustrate the collection.

=== Additional work ===
His creative output extends to music and digital media; he composed the opera La guerre Picrocholine and produces video essays covering art history, philosophy, and drawing techniques.
