= Walter Hus =

Belgian composer and musician (born 1957)

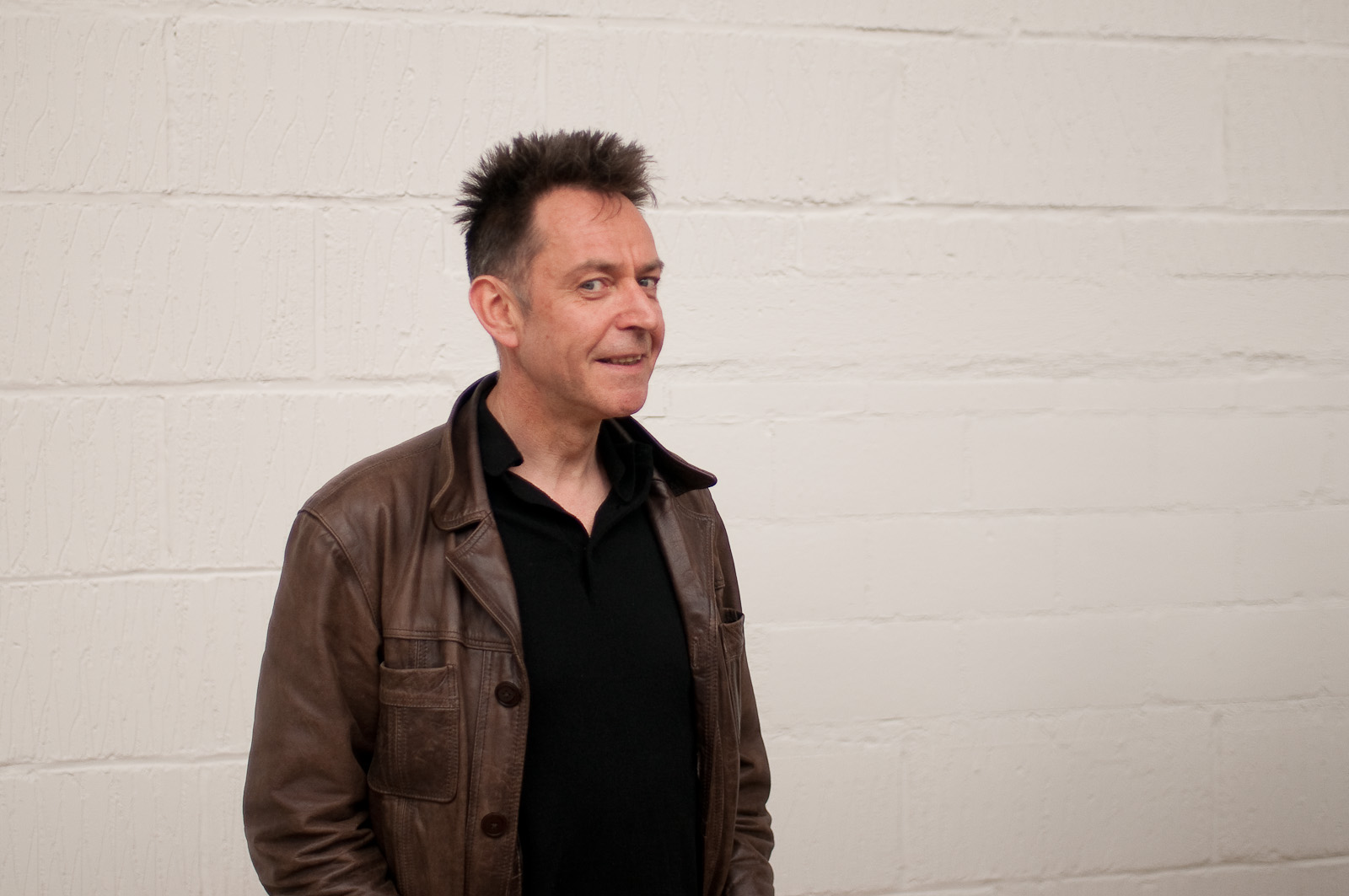
- Walter Hus in May 2009
- Born: 2 July 1957 (age 68); Mol, Belgium
- Occupations: Composer, Musician
- Era: Contemporary

Walter Hus (born July 2, 1959) is a Belgian composer and musician.

He studied at the music conservatories in Ghent and Brussels. In 1984, he graduated with excellence (Diplôme supérieur) for piano with Prof. Dr. Robert Steyaert and soon became involved with new music in many different expressions. He performed improvised piano recitals (1984: LP Eight Etudes on Improvisation); occasionally flirted with free jazz (Belgisch Pianokwartet) and rock (Simpletones); collaborated with painters (Michel Thuns) and video artists (Walter Verdin, Marie André).

He wrote film scores for Suite Sixteen (Dominique Deruddere) and The Pillow Book (Peter Greenaway); toured the world with his ensemble Maximalist! and wrote and performed for theatre and ballet (amongst others Anne Teresa De Keersmaeker, Wim Vandekeybus, Roxanne Huilmand, Needcompany, Bud Blumenthal, Discordia, Beukelaars, Kortekaas, Ritsema).

From the nineties on, he appeared less on stage and concentrated on composition as his main interest.

He was commissioned by a number of music institutions and festivals, such as the Kaaitheater, deSingel, the Beursschouwburg, Automne en Normandie, Festival van Vlaanderen, Antwerpen '93, Happy New Ears, Vooruit, Felix Meritis, Hebbel Theater and the Rode Pomp.

Recent works include four String Quartets ("La Théorie", "Le Désir", "Le Miroir" and "La Folie") and their symphonic transcriptions; chamber music for various combinations of instruments; music for choir and wind-ensembles; one Violin Concerto; one Piano Concerto; solo pieces; two song cycle; a children's opera ("de Nacht"); "Orfeo", an opera

His trilogy of operas ("Meneer, de zot & tkint" / "Bloetwollefduivel" / "Titus Andonderonikustmijnklote"), lyrics by Jan Decorte, toured in Belgium and other European countries and were described as "masterpieces of stilistic venom [...] flawless little lessons in opera eshthetics"

He composed a cycle of twenty-four preludes and fugues in four volumes, for multiple combinations of instruments. In 2004 he performed Books II & III of Preludes and Fugues for 2 pianos with pianist/composer Frederic Rzewski.

In 2012, Hus created an opera based on Chris Ware's Lint (Acme Novelty Library #20).

Since 2004, Walter Hus is artist in residence at Namahn. Walter Hus' recording studio, featuring a Decap organ, is located in the Namahn spaces.

In recent years, Hus is best known for his work with the Decap organ. He started transcribing sheet music for Decap's new instruments in the early 2000s and "fell completely in love with the whole instrumentarium and saw far greater potential in it". Decap lent him an instrument, and Hus continues composing for and performing with the organ.

In 2010, Hus composed a Decap version of Universal Nation for the documentary The Sound of Belgium.

In 2015, he received the Ensor Award at the Oostende International Film Festival for his soundtrack to the film N-the madness of reason by Peter Krüger.
