= Mohsen Namjoo =

Iranian singer-songwriter (born 1976)

- محسن نامجو
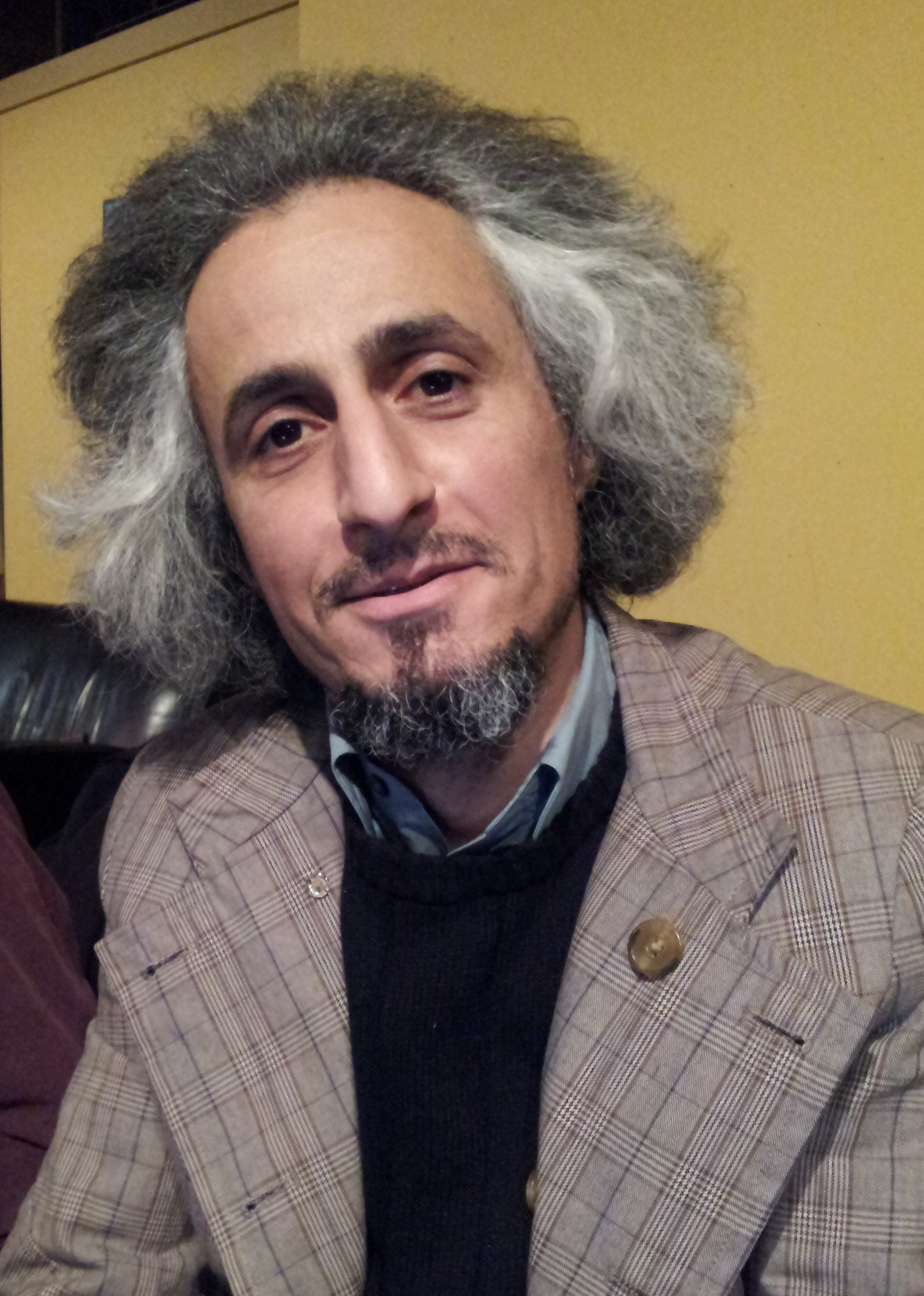
- Namjoo in 2013
- Born: 4 March 1976 (age 50); Torbat-e Jam, Iran
- Education: Tehran University of Art; University of Tehran; Prayner Conservatory; Stanford University
- Occupations: Singer-songwriter; composer; musician
- Years active: 1993–present
- Notable work: Oy; Trust the Tangerine Peel
- Musical career
- Genres: Art rock; Iranian folk; blues rock; experimental rock
- Instruments: Setar; guitar
- Labels: Daf-Daf; Payam; Stradivarius; Nedai; Hozeh Honari
- Website: Official website

Mohsen Namjoo (Note: Persian: محسن نامجو, romanized: Mohsen Nâmju) (born 4 March 1976) is an Iranian singer-songwriter, composer and musician. His style of music is influenced by blues and rock as well as Iranian folk music.

== Early life and education ==
Namjoo was born on 4 March 1976 in Torbat-e Jam, a small town in Razavi Khorasan province in northeastern Iran. He was raised in the religious city of Mashhad. He started learning classical Persian music when he was 12. At a young age, he started listening to Western music and became interested in musicians like Jim Morrison, Eric Clapton, Chris de Burgh and Bob Dylan.

He was admitted to the Tehran University of Art in 1994.

== Career ==
In late 1997 and early 1998, Namjoo had his first two concerts, themed "modern combination of Iranian poetry and music". In 2005, he released a single "Nobahari" (Persian: نوبهاری), (lit."Fresh Spring"), based on the poem is by Iranian famous poet Sadi. The song is praising the Spring, and Namjoo dedicated it to Shahram Nazeri.

In 2003 he started recording parts of his works in Tehran. His debut album titled Toranj was officially released in Iran in September 2007 and the last album to get legal license. The album featured nine traditional folk songs, including poems from Hafez, Rumi, Baba Taher and Attar. It was mostly produced underground music and was very well-received among the Iranian community. This album insulted the Islamic regime, which forced him into exile in 2008. In 2009, while living in Vienna, he was sentenced to five years in prison in absentia for recording music that "dishonours" passages from the Quran.

In 2010, Namjoo kicked off his "A Minor" tour, performing at many venues globally, including the Walt Disney Concert Hall in Los Angeles and the Sony Centre for the Arts in Toronto. Mohsen Namjoo also released a single entitled "Such Strange Times" in June 2010, his first song performed in English. "Strange Times" words came from the Iranian poet Ahmad Shamlou.

It was officially released in June 2010.

In the fall of 2011, Namjoo recorded his next album Alaki live during his concert in Stanford University. This album was part of his work in the Stanford Pan Asian Music Festival. The accompanying band consisted of Ali Bazyar (Percussion), Dina Zarif (back vocal), Tannaz Jaffari (back vocal), Serwah Tabbak (backing vocals), Siamack Sanaie (Guitar), Mark Deutsch: (Bazantar, Guitar).

In the fall of 2012, Namjoo released his new album, 13/8. Thirteen/eight is a compilation of six pieces that were developed in the United States during the previous year. The performance had been prepared in collaboration with California-based musicians James Riotto (Contrabass), Robert Shelton (Keyboard), Ezra Lipp (Drums) and Greg Ellis (Percussion). Payam Entertainment produced a series of live performances for 2012. The inaugural performance in Berkeley, California, will be recorded in preparation for a future double-album release by the same title.

In late 2013, Mohsen Namjoo became an Artist-in-Residence in the Brown University Middle East Studies department. On 7 December 2013, to kick off his residency, he performed at the Granoff Center for the Creative Arts. In spring 2014, he taught the course "Tradition and Protest: Persian and Iranian Music," and gave several musical talks to public audiences on topics including "Shahram Shabpareh: Honesty and Minor Scale" and Iranian Rhythms. The spring 2014 semester was capped by a concert on the evening of 10 May. In the fall of 2014, Namjoo taught "Revolution and Poets: Content and Form in Iranian Poetry."

His newest song named, "Begoo be baran" composed by Ehsan Matoori was released in March 2019 by Sheed Records company. His new album Phantasm, composed and produced by Ehsan Matoori, was released on April 27, 2019, in San Francisco.

In August 2026, Namjoo returned to Iran after nearly two decades abroad. He had left Iran in 2007 and had subsequently lived in the United States. His return was welcomed by Iranian state media, while Namjoo said that he had decided to return several months earlier and had come back to see his homeland and family.

== In popular culture ==
Namjoo has appeared in several films. He was featured in the documentary Sounds of Silence (Amir Hamz and Mark Lazarz, 2006) which has been screened at international film festivals. He also acted in a feature narrative film called A Few Kilos of Dates for a Funeral (directed by Saman Saloor, 2006) which played in various film festivals. In 2016, he played in the feature film Radio Dreams by Babak Jalali.

In August 2023 Namjoo made a guest appearance in the comedy web series Creeps from the Middle East (ydirected by Sina Khani, 2023), which presents improvised sketches and explores themes of cultural identity and urban life.

== Controversies ==
In August of 2020, an anonymous Twitter account with the handle "Mahi" (Fish) accused Namjoo of sexual assault . Following this tweet, several other women came forward on social media accusing Namjoo of assault and/or harassment. "Mahi" eventually released a police report from the attempted rape that took place in California in 2013 to BBC Persian Television.

In April of 2022, Namjoo posted a since-deleted video on his own YouTube channel in which he offered his apologies to those who had accused him of harassment. “Yours truly, Mohsen Namjoo, sincerely, honestly and with humility, apologizes to you for whatever words or deeds that might have been wrong or have hurt you. I express my regrets to both you and your respected and noble families.”

However, the next day, an audio recording of the singer speaking candidly was leaked online. Over the course of the 17-minute monologue, Namjoo makes a number of statement that ignited controversy, such as: "I say this with all humility: one hour of my breathing equals six months in their lives." On the topic of interpretation and poetry Namjoo states: "'No means no?' The beauty of art and literature is that words nd metaphors can have different meanings." Namjoo also declares that he is better than all woman singers and, as an excerpt, claims that all young Iranian woman singers sing “off-key.” Namjoo also expressed that “the only way she can attract attention is to say she is a lesbian because she knows that if she says she is straight... there some things that are God-given, and her appeal is so below-average that nothing has been able to compensate for it.” The recording begins with him saying that since the accusations, his Instagram followers and Spotify plays have only increased.

Namjoo and his legal team have consistently denied all allegations of misconduct.

== Discography ==
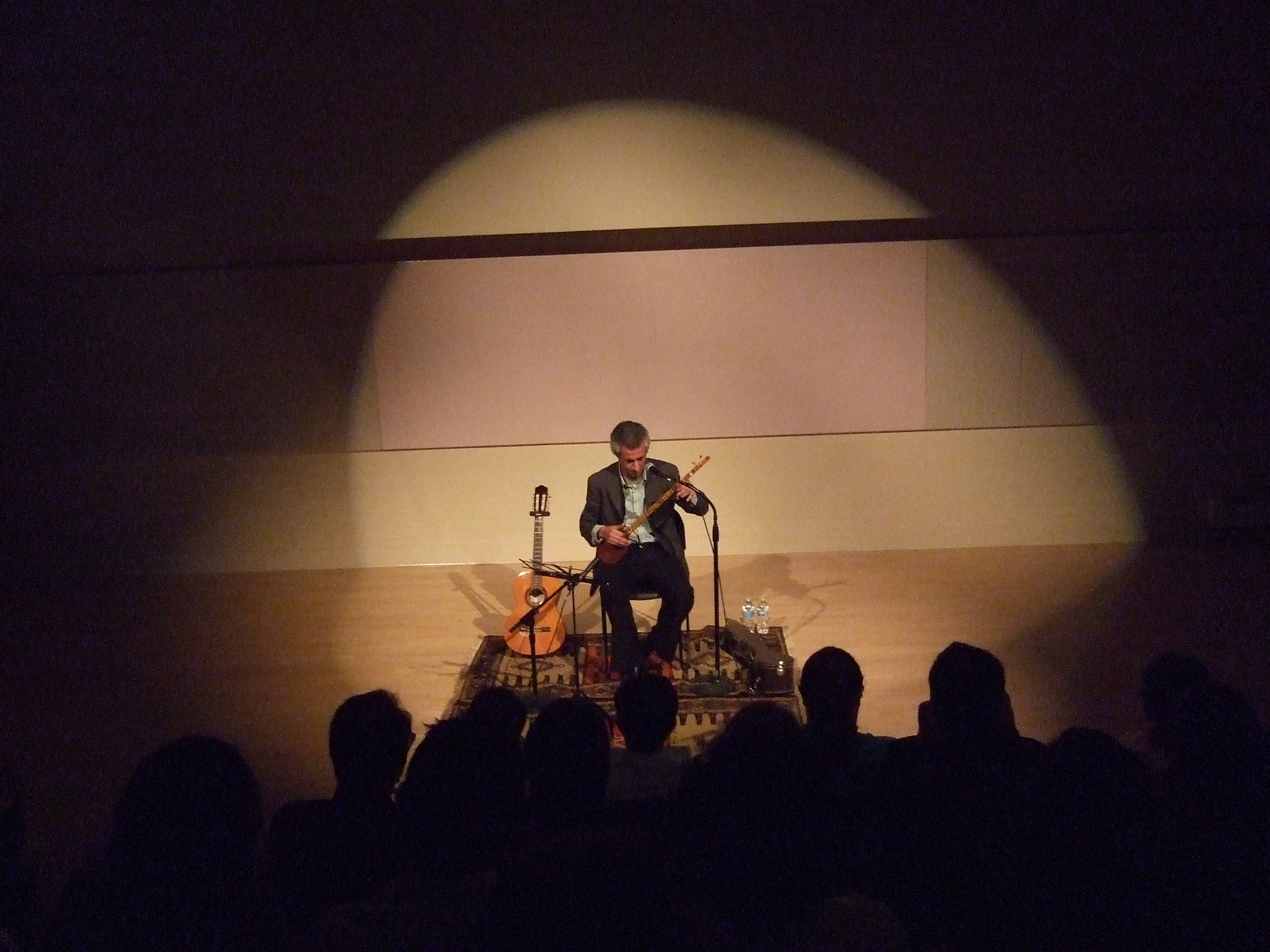
Namjoo in concert (2012) in Urbana, Illinois

=== Albums ===
Studio albums

	Title (English)	Title (Persian)
2005	Damavand	دماوند
2006	Gis	گیس
2007	Toranj	ترنج
2008	Jabr-e Joghrafiyaei	جبرِ جغرافیایی
2009	Oy	آخ
2011	Useless Kisses	بوسه‌های بیهوده
2014	Trust the Tangerine Peel	از پوست نارنگی مدد
2016	Personal Cipher	صفر شخصی
2018	On the String of the Tear's Bow	بر چلّه کمان اشک
2019	Phantasm	سودای من
2020	Motantan	مطنطن
2020	Symphonic Odyssey	سمفونیک اودیسه
2022	Odd Time Rock	لنگ راک
2023	Restless	بی تاب
2024	Oula	اولى

Live albums

Year	Title (English)	Title (Persian)	Month
2011	Alaki	الکی	In December
2012	13/8	سیزده/هشت	In Fall
2017	Voices from the East	آوازهایی از شرق	In July
2017	Axis of Solitude	مؤلفۀ عزلت	In October

== Books ==
=== Audiobooks ===
- The Alchemist (by Paulo Coelho), produced by Caravan (publishing), 2008

=== Books ===
- Dorrabe Makhdoosh (2017)
- Chahar Maghale (2018)

== Theatre ==
- Jana and Baladoor (2012 – A Play in Shadowzs, directed by Bahram Beyzai)
- Arash (2013 – A Play Reading, directed by Bahram Beyzai)

== Filmography ==
Title	Year	Credited as				Notes	Ref.
Title	Year	Actor	Composer	Music department	Soundtrack	Notes	Ref.
Unforgotten Positives	2004	No	Yes	No	No	Short	
Kontrast	2004	No	Yes	No	No	Short	
Hofreh	2006	No	Yes	No	No	Short	
Chand kilo khorma baraye marassem-e tadfin	2006	Abbas	No	No	No		
Hamkhaneh	2007	No	Yes	No	No		
Koodak, dirooz, khial	2007	No	Yes	No	No	Documentary	
Sky Without Passport	2008	Self	Yes	Yes	No	Documentary	
Not an illusion	2009	Self	No	No	No	Documentary	
Appropriate Behavior	2014	No	No	No	Yes	performer: "YAARE JAANI" (BIRJANDI ETHNIC)	
Aramesh ba diazepam 10	2005	Self	No	No	No	Documentary	
A Deep Breath to End	2005	No	Yes	No	No	Documentary	
Bodkin Ras	2016	No	Yes	No	Yes		
Radio Dreams	2016	Hamid Royani	No	No	No		
Behrouz: A Legend on Screen	2017	No	No	Yes	No	Documentary	
The King of Feathers	2020	Self	No	No	No		
Mitra	2021	Self	Yes	No	No	post-production	
Creeps from the Middle East	2023	Self	No	No	Yes	Episode: The Tears of Sina Khani	

== Performance ==
=== Philadelphia, U.S. ===
2014: Mohsen Namjoo performed with the Al-Bustan Takht Ensemble as part of the Al-Bustan Seeds of Culture concert series.

=== Stockholm, Sweden ===
2020: Mohsen Namjoo Performed with Stockholm Symphony Orchestra.

== See also ==
- Persian traditional music
- Rock and alternative music in Iran
