= Sounds of Silence (2006 film) =

- Release date: 2006
- Languages: Persian with English subtitles and narration

Sounds of Silence is a 2006 documentary by Amir Hamz and Mark Lazarz about music in Iran. It was featured at the 2006 Tribeca Film Festival, including music from O-Hum, Barobax, and Hichkas.
