= Peter Krüger (film director) =

Belgian filmmaker and screenwriter (born 1970)

- Born: Peter Elvier Albert Walter Krüger; 9 August 1970 (age 54); Ghent, Flanders, Belgium
- Occupation(s): Inti Films Executive Director, Film director, film producer, screenwriter
- Years active: 1993–present

Peter Krüger (born 9 August 1970) is a Belgian film director, producer and screenwriter. He is best known for directing the fiction film N – The Madness of Reason (2014), winning the Ensor Award for Best Film, and Antwerp Central (2011) winning the Grand Prize at this 29th International Festival of Films on Art in Montreal.

== Early life ==
Krüger is the only child from the marriage of Jan Krüger, a Belgian mathematician, and Agnes Claeys, historian. He was born and raised in Ghent. In 1978 he began studying music at the Music School and later studied piano with the Belgian pianist and composer Claude Coppens at the Royal Conservatory. In 1988 he went to Tuscaloosa, Alabama where he attended the University of Alabama to study American Literature and Art History. In 1989 he returned to Belgium and to attend classes at the Institute of Philosophy, University of Leuven and the Institute for Cultural Studies (Instituut voor Culturele Studies). By 1994, Krüger graduated with a master's degree in philosophy from the Katholieke Universiteit Leuven.

After graduating, Krüger began studying film script writing, directing, and producing. He took a Basic Script Writing course at the Flemish Script Academy (Vlaamse Script Academie) in Brussels and completed several European training programs supported by the MEDIA Programme of the European Union: North by Northwest, the Northern European screen writing development program in Copenhagen, Hamburg, and Dublin; and Strategic Film Financing, and Strategic Film Marketing in Luxembourg. In 2000 Krüger went to Maine, United States to study a Master Class Film Directing with American actor, screenwriter, director, and producer Paul Schneider; and in Los Angeles, United States he enrolled in an acting workshop with the American, author, script analyst, and actress Judith Weston.

== Career ==
In 1993, Krüger co-founded, with Belgian writer and director Peter Brosens, Inti Films, a Brussels-based film production company. At Inti Films Krüger produced, amongst others, such award-winning films as 2012's Kinshasa Kids, an official selection at Venice Days; Renzo Martens' 2013 Enjoy Poverty, an art film on the exploitation of third world poverty; and Peter Brosens' internationally acclaimed Mongolia trilogy, consisting of the documentaries City of the Steppes (1993), State of Dogs (1998) and Poets of Mongolia (1999).

Krüger directed the award-winning Antwerp Central, a documentary-feature from Sophimages, which was produced by Jan Roekens. The film, which is based on the book Austerlitz by W. G. Sebald, features Antwerp's main railway station as a location where history, daily life, fiction, and reality are in constant flux. Running as a thread through the film are the dreams and reminiscences of a traveler, who arrives at Antwerp Central and through whose eyes we observe the station. The traveler is played by Belgian actor Johan Leysen (who in 2010 appeared with acclaimed actor George Clooney in The American). Antwerp Central won the Grand Prix at the 29th International Festival of Films on Art in Montreal.

Krüger's second feature film, N – The Madness of Reason, was written in collaboration with Nigerian-born poet and novelist Ben Okri. The film follows the spirit of Raymond Borremans (Michael Lonsdale), a French man who left Europe and who dies in 1988 in Abidjan. His spirit wanders across the West-African continent and evokes a confrontation between European and West-African culture. The film was released at the Berlinale 2014 and is three times winner of the ENSOR awards at the 2015 Ostend Film Festival. In 2014 N – The Madness of Reason received the Jury Award for Best Film at Cine Migrante International Film Festival, Brasília, Brazil.

In 2017, Krüger was announced to direct a film adaptation of Ben Okri's 2014 novel The Age of Magic.

== Filmography ==
Year	Title	Role	Type	Notes
2019	The Age of Magic	Writer, director	Feature film	Scrip and development award Flanders Audiovisual Fund (VAF).
2014	N – The Madness of Reason	Writer, director, producer	Feature film	Produced by Inti Films & co-produced by Cobra Films, Dieptescherpte, Blinker Filmproduktion. Won the Ensor Award for Best Film, Best Editing and Best Music at the 2015 Ostend Film Festival and got nominated for the Best D.O.P. Nominated – 2014 Jury Award for Best Film, Cine Migrante International Film Festival, Brasilia, Brazil.
2011	Antwerp Central	Writer, director	Feature documentary film	Produced by Sophimages. Grand Prize at the 29th Festival international du film sur l'art / FIFA – International Festival of Films on Art in Montreal.
2007	The Last Sigh	Writer, director	Documentary	Produced by Inti Films.
2004	The Monastery of Beniktbeuern	Writer, director	Documentary	Produced by Wajnbrosse Productions and ARTE France.
2003	Les Thermes de Karlovy Vary	Writer, director	Documentary	Produced by Wajnbrosse Productions and ARTE France.
2002	The Strange Man	Writer, director	Fiction film	Produced by Inti Films.
2001	The Eclipse of Sint-Gillis	Writer, director	Creative documentary	Produced by Inti Films.
1999	Poets of Mongolia	Writer, director	Creative documentary	Produced by Inti Films and Millennium Film.
1998	Roberte’s Dance	Writer, director, co-director Gerrit Messiaen	Documentary	Produced by Inti Films, d.net.work, and ZDF/ARTE.
1997	Nazareth	Peter Krüger	Creative documentary	Produced by Inti Films.
1995	News Items	Writer, director, co-director Gerrit Messiaen	Documentary	Produced by Inti Films.
