= Alex Cameron (musician) =

Australian singer (born 1988)

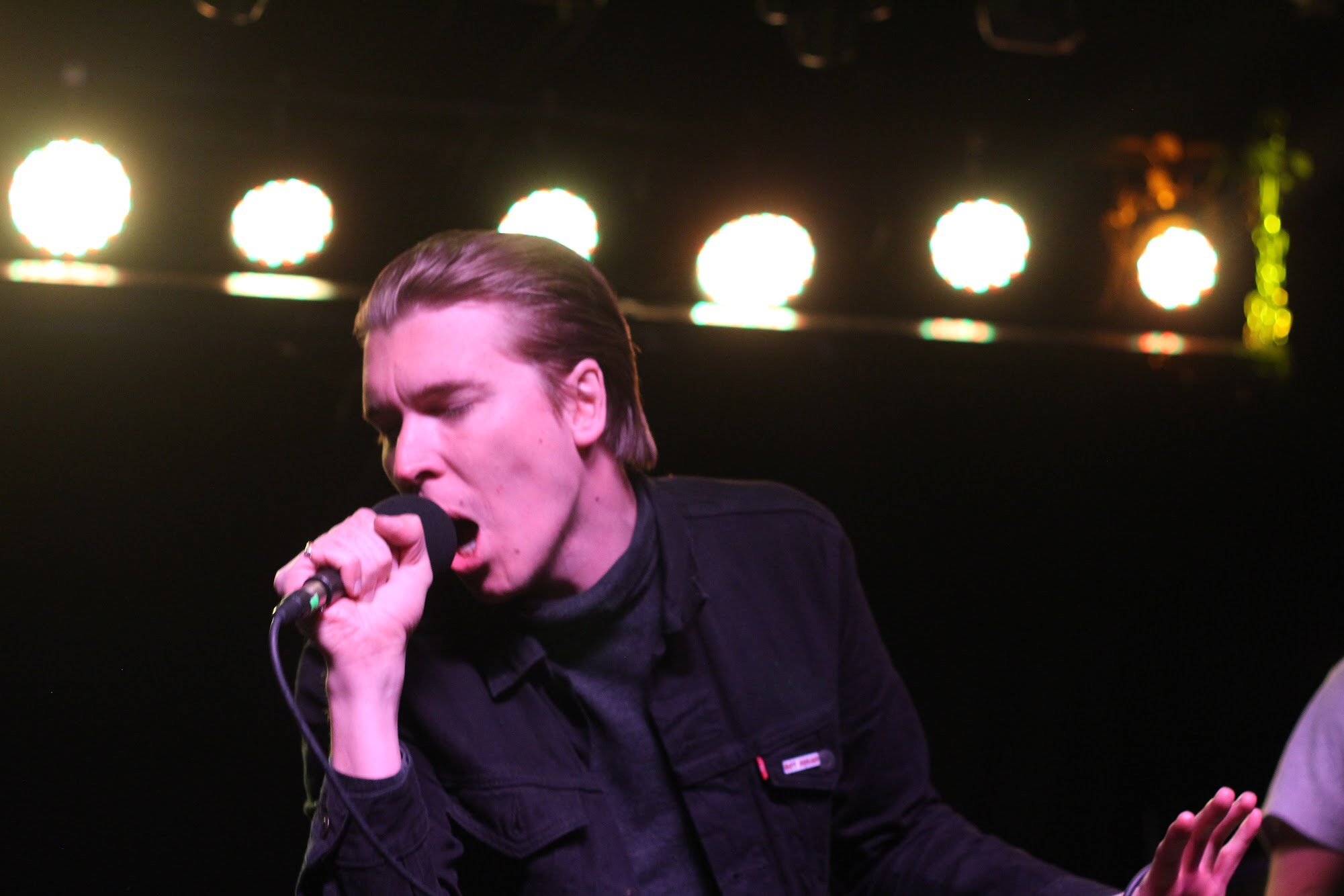
- Cameron in 2018

Background information
- Born: 11 September 1988 (age 38); Sydney, Australia
- Genres: Synth-pop; soft rock
- Occupations: Singer-songwriter, musician
- Years active: 2006–present
- Label: Secretly Canadian
- Formerly of: Seekae

Alexander Cameron (born 11 September 1988) is an Australian singer-songwriter from Sydney. He is best known for his solo career, a high-concept act in which Cameron initially adopted the persona of a failed entertainer. Between 2012 and 2024, Cameron was often joined during live performances and in the studio by his saxophonist and "business partner" Roy Molloy. Before making music under his own name, Cameron was a member of the electronica act Seekae, with whom he released three studio albums.

Cameron independently released his debut album, Jumping the Shark, for free on his website in 2013. In 2016, Secretly Canadian reissued the album to a wider audience and growing cult fanbase. In 2017, Cameron released his second studio album, Forced Witness, featuring contributions from Molloy, Brandon Flowers, Angel Olsen and Jonathan Rado. His third studio album, Miami Memory, was inspired by his then-relationship with actress Jemima Kirke and released in September 2019. His fourth studio album, Oxy Music, was released in March 2022. Working with musicians and producers Mark Perkins and Maxim Ludwig, Cameron released his fifth studio album, Late to Set, in July 2026.

In addition to his own material, Cameron has co-written with other artists, including the Killers, where he co-wrote several songs on the albums, Wonderful Wonderful (2017) and Imploding the Mirage (2020); and Keli Holiday, where he co-wrote the single "Dancing2", which was nominated for Song of the Year and Most Performed Alternative Work at the APRA Music Awards of 2026.

== Career ==
=== 2013–2016: Jumping the Shark ===
Regarding his adopted persona of that of a failed musician, Cameron notes, "I write about the outlier, the table-for-one guy, the guy whose life is a constellation of microscopic tragedies. Failure has been underexplored in music. My characters come from a place where ambition, crippling self-doubt and tragedy intersect."

After releasing his debut album, Jumping the Shark, for free on his website, and physically through Siberia Records, Cameron attracted the attention of indie rock duo Foxygen while performing at David Lynch's Parisian club, Silencio. Cameron toured extensively with Mac DeMarco, Kevin Morby, Unknown Mortal Orchestra and Angel Olsen in the ensuing years. While on tour with Morby in April 2016, the label Secretly Canadian announced they had signed Cameron and would be re-releasing Jumping the Shark in August 2016. Upon the announcement, Cameron issued the following statement: "Its 2016 [sic], and its time for Alex Cameron. Entertainer. Showman. Shaman. Side by side with his business partner and saxophonist, Roy Molloy, the duo are a living and breathing story of success told through the internet; unedited, unscripted, and, up until now, to a dedicated audience of no one. Thanks to the good people at Secretly Canadian that is about to change."

=== 2017–2018: Forced Witness ===
In 2017, Cameron released his second studio album, Forced Witness, a departure from the mostly-electronic sound of his debut album, the album was produced by Foxygen's Jonathan Rado, and features a full-band production, including saxophonist Roy Molloy. That same year, Cameron co-wrote five tracks on The Killers' fifth studio album, Wonderful Wonderful, with frontman Brandon Flowers appearing on the closing track of Forced Witness, "Politics of Love".

The album's accompanying tour found Cameron fronting a full band – including Molloy, keyboardist Holiday Sidewinder, guitarist Justin Nijssen – and supporting The Killers on their UK and US arena tour.

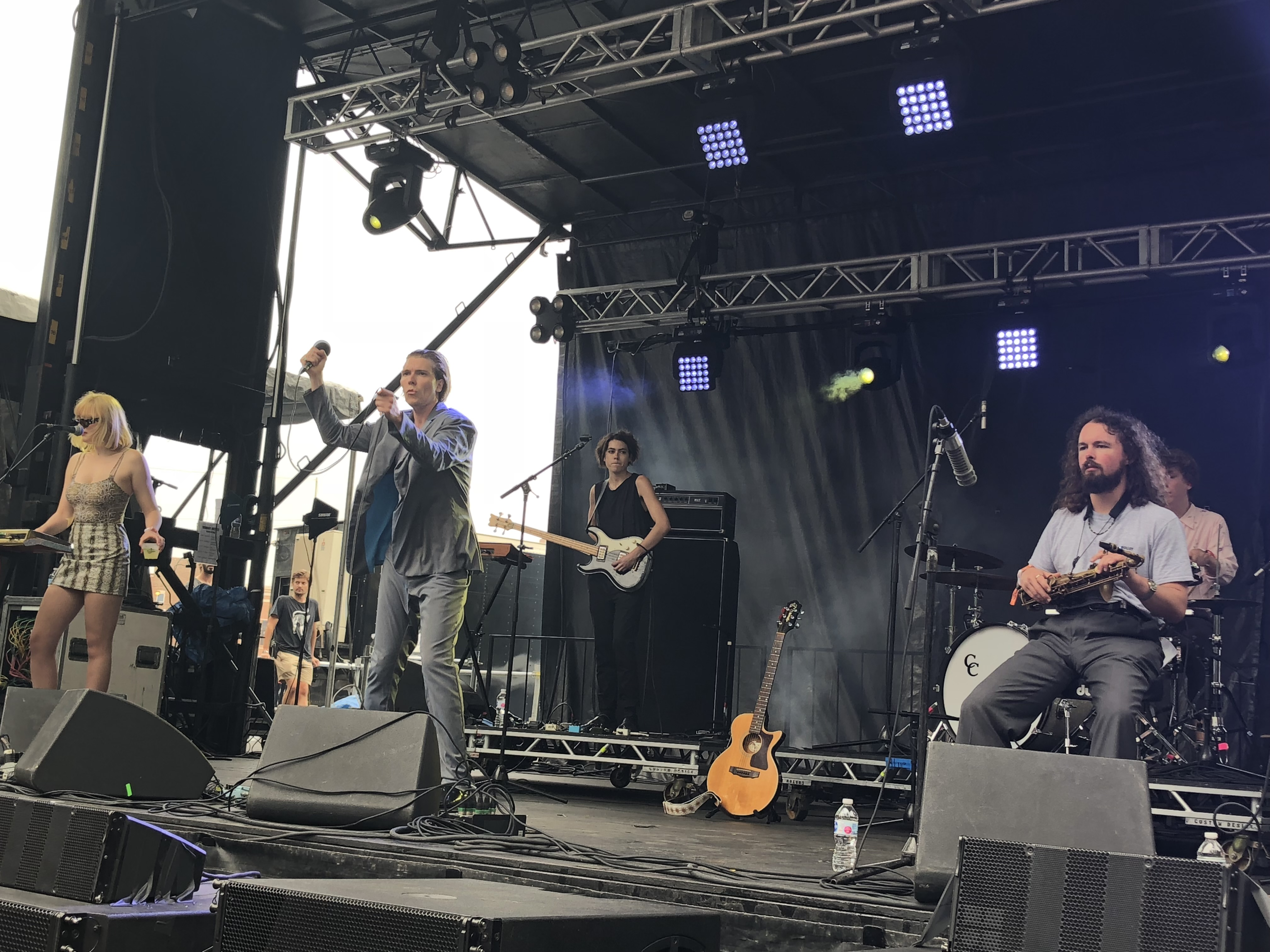
Alex Cameron performing at Pitchfork Music Festival in 2018

On 26 September 2018, Cameron and Molloy hosted a 24-hour telethon via Instagram, Twitter, and Facebook Live with the express goal to "save the music industry and pad our pantry out by selling 1000 records in 24 hours," which they succeeded in doing.

=== 2019–2020: Miami Memory ===
On 18 June 2019, Cameron announced his third studio album, Miami Memory. The album was released on 13 September 2019 via Secretly Canadian. For the album's accompanying tour, lead guitarist Lilah Larson joined Cameron's live band, replacing keyboard and backing vocalist Holiday Sidewinder, who left to focus on her solo career.

In 2020, Cameron co-wrote four songs on The Killers' sixth studio album, Imploding the Mirage, co-produced by Cameron's longtime producer Jonathan Rado. On May 8, 2020, Cameron released a single cover of the Paul Kelly song "Before Too Long".

=== 2021–2024: Oxy Music ===
In July 2021, it was announced that Cameron would commence a European Tour in 2022 with Roy Molloy.

In November 2021, Cameron released "Sara Jo", the first single since 2019.

On 20 January 2022, Cameron announced his fourth studio album Oxy Music, to be released on 11 March 2022, and supported by a tour of North America and Europe. The album's second single, titled "Best Life", was released the same day accompanied by a music video directed by his ex-wife Jemima Kirke. The album features Lloyd Vines and Sleaford Mods' Jason Williamson. The album is inspired by the opioid epidemic and Nico Walker's novel Cherry. In its press release, Cameron explained: "The album is a story, a work of fiction, mostly from the perspective of a man. Starved of meaningful purpose, confused about the state of the world, and in dire need of a reason to live. This is one of those people."

=== 2025–present: Late to Set ===
On October 13, 2025, Cameron released a stand-alone single called "Short King". The track was produced by Cameron and Mark Perkins, with Maxim Ludwig providing additional instrumentation. In addition to his own material, Cameron co-wrote the song "Dancing2" by Keli Holiday, which reached number twenty-four on the Australian ARIA Charts and number seven on the New Zealand Hot Singles Chart. The song was subsequently nominated for Song of the Year and Most Performed Alternative Work at the APRA Music Awards of 2026.

The trio of Cameron, Perkins and Ludwig continued working together for Cameron's fifth studio album, Late to Set, which was released on July 24, 2026. Following the album's release, Cameron will support the Strokes on their arena tour in support of their seventh studio album, Reality Awaits, which was released on the same day as Late to Set.

== Personal life ==
Cameron started dating actress Jemima Kirke in July 2017. The couple has since separated.

== Backing band ==
Current

- Mark Perkins
- Maxim Ludwig

Former

- Roy Molloy – saxophone, "business partner" (2012–2024)
- Holiday Sidewinder – keyboards, backing vocals (2017–2019)
- Jack Ladder – keyboards, guitar (occasional appearances; 2017)
- Justin Nijssen – bass guitar, guitar, backing vocals (2017–2023)
- Henri Lindström – drums, percussion (2017–2023)
- Lawrence Pike – drums (2018)
- Lilah Larson – lead guitar, backing vocals (2019–2023)
- Jess Parsons – keyboards, backing vocals (2019–2023)

== Discography ==
=== Studio albums ===
List of studio albums released, with year released and label shown
Title	Details	Peak chart positions
Title	Details	AUS
Jumping the Shark	Released: 2013; Label: Crawfish, Siberia (alex001); Format: CD, LP, digital download	—
Forced Witness	Released: 8 September 2017; Label: Secretly Canadian (SC336); Format: CD, LP, digital download, streaming	—
Miami Memory	Released: 13 September 2019; Label: Secretly Canadian (SC378); Format: CD, LP, digital download, streaming	94
Oxy Music	Released: 11 March 2022; Label: Secretly Canadian (SC449); Format: CD, LP, digital download, streaming	—
Late to Set	Released: 24 July 2026	–

=== Live albums ===
List of live albums released, with year released and label shown
Title	Details
Live in San Francisco	Released: 2019; Label: Castle Face (CF 112); Format: Limited LP

=== EPs ===
List of EPs released, with year released and label shown
Title	Details
Miami Memories	Released: August 2020; Label: Secretly Canadian; Format: Demos EP

== Awards and nominations ==
=== APRA Awards ===
The APRA Awards are presented annually from 1982 by the Australasian Performing Right Association (APRA), "honouring composers and songwriters".

Year	Nominee / work	Award	Result	Ref.
2018	"Strangers Kiss"	Song of the Year	Shortlisted	
2026	"Dancing2" by Keli Holiday (Adam Hyde, Alex Cameron, Konstantin Kersting)	Song of the Year	Shortlisted	
2026	"Dancing2" by Keli Holiday (Adam Hyde, Alex Cameron, Konstantin Kersting)	Most Performed Alternative Work	Nominated	
