= Jonathan Gray (producer) =

French-American film producer

- Born: August 24, 1980 (age 46); Cannes, France
- Occupations: Entrepreneur, investor Film and TV producer
- Father: Martin Gray

Jonathan Gray (born 24 August 1980 in Cannes, France) is a French-American entrepreneur, investor, and film and TV producer. He founded the strategic investment firm First Idea in 2008, and the LA-based film production company The Hideaway Entertainment in 2017.

== Biography ==
Gray is the son of French-American Holocaust survivor and writer Martin Gray. He attended the Carnot high school in Cannes, with a literature-focused curriculum, and then attended the SKEMA Business School in Sophia Antipolis.

At 16 years old, he worked for Disney to welcome stars in Cannes and organize their stay. At the age of 20, Jonathan Gray became the assistant of a real estate developer in Southern France. From 2003 to 2019, he founded and managed his own events company, JG Events, specialized in luxury events. In 2005, he launched a real estate company representing high-end properties on the Côte d'azur. In 2007, the company merged with the London-based real estate broker Beauchamp Estates, making Jonathan Gray co-owner of the company and its exclusive representative in France. He sold the Château Miraval to Brad Pitt and Angelina Jolie, the Villa les Cèdres in Saint-Jean-Cap-Ferrat, and La Belle Époque in Monaco.

From 2005 to 2009, Jonathan Gray was also the founder and managing director of the French subsidiary of the high-end concierge service Quintessentially. In 2008, he founded First Idea International Ltd., a strategic investment consultancy with a focus on the post-oil economy in the Middle East.

In 2017, Gray launched the independent film production company The Hideaway Entertainment, marking the start of his career as a producer. With The Hideaway Entertainment, Jonathan Gray was involved in the production of the films Mile 22 (2018), Men in Black: International (2019), Bloodshot (2020), and Cherry (2021).

In 2019, Jonathan Gray launched the company Intelligent Design Agency (iDeA) which develops "idea-first" technologies for large scale projects, including Saudi Arabia's futurist city Neom. In May 2023, he was appointed to the board of directors of Prairie Operating Co., a Nasdaq-quoted energy investment company.

== Filmography ==
Release date	Title	Directors	Role	Refs
August 17, 2018	Mile 22	Peter Berg	Executive Producer	
June 14, 2019	Men in Black: International	F. Gary Gray	Executive Producer	
March 13, 2020	Bloodshot	David S. F. Wilson	Executive Producer	
February 26, 2021	Cherry	Anthony Russo; Joe Russo	Producer	
April 24, 2026	The School Duel	Todd Wiseman Jr	Executive Producer	
	Freedom Ride	Deon Taylor	Producer	
	Combat Control	Sam Hargrave	Producer	
	Otherwise Illegal Activity		Producer	
	Escape	James Watkins	Producer	
	For Those I loved		Producer	
	Can You Hear Me?	Dean Israelite	Producer	

Key
†	Denotes films that have not yet been released
