= Oxy Music =

Studio album by Alex Cameron
- Released: 11 March 2022
- Genre: Soft rock
- Length: 34:03
- Label: Secretly Canadian
- Producer: Alex Cameron

Alex Cameron chronology
Miami Memory (2019)	Oxy Music (2022)	Late to Set (2026)

Singles from Oxy Music
- 1. "Sara Jo" Released: 17 November 2021; 2. "Best Life" Released: 20 January 2022; 3. "K Hole" Released: 1 March 2022

Oxy Music is the fourth studio album by Australian musician Alex Cameron, released on 11 March 2022 by the record label Secretly Canadian. Produced by Cameron himself, the album maintains his distinct storytelling style from the perspectives of various characters. Initially inspired by Nico Walker's autofictional novel Cherry (2018), Oxy Music primarily revolves around a fictional man grappling with the opioid epidemic in the United States. The album's release was preceded by the singles "Sara Jo", "Best Life" and "K Hole". Critically, the album has garnered generally favorable reviews.

== Critical reception ==
Professional ratings
Aggregate scores
Source	Rating
AnyDecentMusic?	6.9/10
Metacritic	73/100
Review scores
Source	Rating
American Songwriter	4/5 stars
Clash	7/10
DIY	4/5 stars
Exclaim!	7/10
Mojo	4/5 stars
NME	3/5 stars
Pitchfork	5.0/10
The Skinny	4/5 stars
Uncut	7/10

Oxy Music was released to a positive reception from contemporary music critics. At Metacritic, which assigns a normalized rating out of 100 to reviews from mainstream critics, the album received an average score of 73, based on 11 reviews, which indicates "generally favorable reviews". Aggregator AnyDecentMusic? gave it 6.9 out of 10, based on their assessment of the critical consensus.

Ryan Bell of DIY wrote, "Its steady pace and relatively tame nature (by his standards) means it might not be his most immediately striking release, but it's still testament to his talent as an astute alt-pop songwriter." Michael Di Gennaro of Exclaim wrote, "Oxy Music's greatest strength is that it makes the plight of an addict easy to understand and sympathize with, and may even help addicts who tune in feel less alone."

In a negative review, Sophie Kemp of Pitchfork criticized the album's production as being among the weakest in Cameron's career. Kemp also criticized its concept, writing, "More than anything, it takes on the quality of a short story written by a young student trying to cram as many neon lights, bongs, uzis, blow jobs, g-strings, and jokes into 10 pages as possible. For how clearly smart, ambitious, and upsettingly tuneful Cameron is, it’s a pity that he uses his talent for these exercises in sophistry, music that feels so vacuous and fleeting that it becomes one with the very modernity it seeks to lampoon."

== Track listing ==
All tracks are written by Alex Cameron, with contributions by Justin Nijssen, Roy Molloy, Lloyd Vines and Jason Williamson.

No.	Title	Length
1.	"Best Life"	3:14
2.	"Sara Jo"	3:02
3.	"Prescription Refill"	3:31
4.	"Hold the Line"	4:13
5.	"Breakdown"	3:19
6.	"K Hole"	3:30
7.	"Dead Eyes"	3:30
8.	"Cancel Culture" (featuring Lloyd Vines)	3:33
9.	"Oxy Music" (featuring Jason Williamson)	6:11
Total length:		34:03

== Personnel ==
Performance

- Alex Cameron – vocals, piano, keyboards, drum machine
- Henri Lindström – drums, percussion
- Justin Nijssen – bass, guitar, vocals
- Lilah Larson – guitar, vocals
- Jess Parsons – piano, keyboards, vocals
- Roy Molloy – saxophone
- Chris Pitsiokos – saxophone
- Lloyd Vines – vocals
- Jason Williamson – vocals
- Jackie McLean – vocals

Technical

- Alex Cameron – production, recording
- Justin Nijssen – additional production
- Lilah Larson – additional production
- Lauri Eloranta – drum recording
- Kai Campos – mixing (all tracks)
- Danny Trachtenberg – mixing (1)
- Joe LaPorta – mastering

Art

- Jemima Kirke – cover photography
- McLean Stephenson – cover photograph edit
- Nick Scott – layout

== Charts ==
Chart performance for Oxy Music
Chart (2022)	Peak position
Scottish Albums (Official Charts)	81
UK Independent Albums (Official Charts)	39
US Top Current Album Sales (Billboard)	99
