= Matty Goldberg =

American comedian

- Born: Matthew Goldberg
- Occupation: Comedian
- Years active: 2002–present
- Relatives: Jessica Goldberg (sister)
- Website: mattygoldberg.com

Matty Goldberg is an American comedian.

== Early life ==
Goldberg had his TV debut in 2006 on BET's "106 and Park." He also did an ad campaign in 2009 for Converse with Dwyane Wade as billionaire Charles Charles MaGalls. He currently resides in Los Angeles.

He was also part of Microsoft's launch of the Microsoft Kin cellphone. The online and TV campaign from agencytwofifteen (formerly T.A.G.), San Francisco, called "The Social Media Sociologist," focused on one consumer, Rosa Salazar, a 24-year-old aspiring comedian from Brooklyn. Camera crews followed Salazar around as she communicated with her 700-plus Facebook friends.

== Career ==
Goldberg began his stand-up comedy career in 2001. He regularly performs in comedy clubs throughout the greater LA area.

In 2017, Goldberg revealed in episode 339 of the Dirty Sports Podcast that he had been cast as a single-appearance character for the 3rd season of the Hulu original series The Path, created by his sister, Jessica Goldberg, whose basement he resided in at the time with his then-girlfriend Paige, also known as Miss UConn.

On August 21, 2018, Goldberg was invited onto episode 44 of the Dent Report podcast, also hosted by comedian and brain injury survivor Andy Ruther, to publicly discuss their strained relationship and the current status of their friendship.

On October 6, 2020, Goldberg appeared on the final episode (#96) of the Dent Report podcast with Ruther. They discussed the recent, unexpected passing of Ruther's father, Walt Ruther. In the same episode, Goldberg addressed his debilitating gambling addiction and revealed his plans to become a professional poker player. He also revealed his hiatus from stand-up comedy, citing the fact that the medium no longer brought him happiness or joy.
