= Cherry (2021 film) =

American crime drama film

- Release poster
- Directed by: Anthony Russo; Joe Russo
- Screenplay by: Angela Russo-Otstot; Jessica Goldberg
- Based on: Cherry by Nico Walker
- Produced by: Joe Russo; Anthony Russo; Mike Larocca; Jonathan Gray; Matthew Rhodes; Jake Aust; Chris Castaldi
- Starring: Tom Holland; Ciara Bravo; Jack Reynor; Jeff Wahlberg
- Cinematography: Newton Thomas Sigel
- Edited by: Jeff Groth
- Music by: Henry Jackman
- Production companies: The Hideaway Entertainment; AGBO; Endeavor Content
- Distributed by: Apple TV+ (under Apple Original Films)
- Release date: February 26, 2021
- Running time: 141 minutes
- Country: United States
- Language: English
- Budget: $40 million

Cherry is a 2021 American crime drama film directed by Anthony and Joe Russo from a screenplay by Angela Russo-Otstot and Jessica Goldberg, based on Nico Walker‘s semi-autobiographical 2018 novel. It stars Tom Holland as the titular character, alongside Ciara Bravo, Jack Reynor, and Jeff Wahlberg. The film follows the life of Cherry, from a college student to a PTSD-afflicted veteran who robs banks to pay for his and his wife's drug addiction.

Cherry was released in select theaters on February 26, 2021, and received a streaming release on March 12, by Apple TV+. The film received mixed reviews from critics, who praised Holland's and Bravo's performances, but criticized its writing and direction.

== Plot ==
Narrative acts
- Prologue
- 1. When Life Was Beginning, I Saw You (2002)
- 2. Basic (2003)
- 3. Cherry
- 4. Home (2005)
- 5. Dope Life
- Epilogue (2007–2021)

College student Cherry falls in love at first sight with his classmate Emily. Their relationship blossoms but Emily decides to leave him and study in Montreal. Cherry is devastated and enlists in the Army as a medic to escape his heartbreak. Just before he is about to leave for basic training, Emily realizes her mistake and confesses she is in love with Cherry too and that they are meant for one another. Cherry and Emily marry before his deployment.

During his two-year service in the Army, Cherry suffers from PTSD after having several horrific experiences, including seeing his friend, Jimenez, burnt and killed from an IED. To cope with his panic attacks and severe anxiety when he comes home, he abuses OxyContin, prescribed from a doctor helping to decrease his PTSD symptoms. His growing addiction begins to frustrate Emily and as a result, she begins taking Cherry's medication to deal with her own frustration of not knowing how to support him without drugs and the two soon become addicted to OxyContin, and eventually heroin.

After they break into a safe that he was looking after for his drug dealer, Pills and Coke, he and Emily use most of the drugs secured inside for themselves. Sometime later, Pills and Coke visits, and, feigning being police, cause Cherry and Emily to flush the rest of the drugs down the toilet in a panic. Seeing the empty safe, Cherry learns from Pills and Coke that his boss, Black, is the owner of the safe and will kill all three of them for this. To get the money for the drugs they used, Cherry robs a bank and pays back the money. As a result of their daily heroin use, Cherry continues to rob banks frequently after he and Emily go through severe withdrawals. Emily overdoses and almost dies in a hospital. Cherry is blamed and forced by Emily's mother to leave her alone.

Emily leaves her drug rehabilitation facility and reunites with Cherry. He tries to send her back and persuade her that he is no good for her. Emily does not care and tells Cherry she wants to be with him; she will get high on drugs again no matter what. Needing more money to support their addiction, he enlists Pills and Coke and his friend, James Lightfoot, to help him rob multiple tellers at once. During a robbery, Pills and Coke abandons the robbery, forcing Cherry to rob the bank alone. As he drives away with Lightfoot in a getaway car, Cherry stresses that Pills and Coke will likely rat him out if he gets caught and convinces Lightfoot to turn the car around and search for him. After putting Pills and Coke in the car, he sees that he has been shot and is severely bleeding. They debate whether to take him to the hospital, but decide it is too risky, and he dies from his gunshot wound. They then rob and dump his body on the side of the road before parting ways.

Black later confronts Cherry outside his home to settle the drug debt. Cherry kisses and says goodbye to Emily before performing one last robbery. During the robbery, Cherry persuades the bank teller to set off the alarm before he leaves with the money. Cherry gives Black all of the money, then walks out to the open road and gets the attention of the police by firing his gun in the air, proceeding to sit by the side of the road and get high one last time, before police arrive and arrest him.

Cherry detoxes and recovers in prison, spending 14 years serving his sentence before being released on parole. As Cherry makes his way out of the prison, he sees Emily waiting for him, bringing him to tears of joy.

== Cast ==
- Tom Holland as Cherry, a fictional character based on Nico Walker
- Ciara Bravo as Emily (inspired by Kara Walker)
- Jack Reynor as Pills and Coke
- Michael Rispoli as Tommy
- Jeff Wahlberg as Jimenez
- Forrest Goodluck as James Lightfoot
- Michael Gandolfini as Cousin Joe
- Kyle Harvey as Roy
- Pooch Hall as Sgt. Whoareyou
- Damon Wayans Jr. as Drill Sgt. Masters
- Thomas Lennon as Dr. Whomever
- Kelli Berglund as Madison Kowalski
- Jose Pablo Cantillo as Drill Sgt. Deco
- Nicole Forester as the Doctor
- Jamie Brewer as Shelly
- Fionn O'Shea as Arnold
- Bobby Schofield as clover
- Sam Clemmett as Yuri
- Adam Long as Staff Sgt. Greene

== Production ==
Anthony and Joe Russo's production company AGBO purchased the production rights to the novel in August 2018, beating out offers from Warner Bros. Entertainment which would've had James Franco directing, and Sony Pictures Entertainment, with the Russos set to direct the film. In March 2019, Tom Holland, who previously collaborated with the Russos on Marvel Studios' Marvel Cinematic Universe (MCU) films Captain America: Civil War (2016), Avengers: Infinity War (2018), and Avengers: Endgame (2019) entered talks to star in the film. Ciara Bravo, Jack Reynor, Jeff Wahlberg, Kyle Harvey, Forrest Goodluck and Michael Gandolfini were added to the cast in October. Pooch Hall was cast in an undisclosed role in December 2019.

Filming was initially reported to begin on July 15, 2019. The filmmakers had plans to shoot the film in Ohio, the setting of the novel and homestate of the Russo brothers, but due to the Greater Cleveland Film Commission's proposed changes in tax incentives were forced to move the planned shooting to California. However, the proposed figures were lowered from $100 million to $40 million, and production returned to the state. Because of this, filming did not begin until October 8, 2019 and concluded in February 2020. Filming occurred mostly in Cleveland, Ohio. The lead actor, Tom Holland, was spotted in Cleveland's Gordon Square neighborhood in November 2019. On Detroit Avenue, some scenes were filmed inside the subway, after which Holland was seen hurrying outside for some exterior shots. In the morning, the crew had shot several scenes inside the Pioneer Savings Bank, where they probably filmed one of the robberies. Some important shots were also taken at Case Western Reserve University, the top-ranked private research university in Cleveland.

Filming was also done in Lorain, at Broadway Avenue and on East 20th Street (just east of Broadway). In Marion, prison scenes were filmed at the North Central Correctional Complex in Marion County, a high-security prison for men. The crew also filmed a few scenes in Bedford, at St. Peter Chanel High School, before it was demolished. The Russo brothers tweeted about it being the high school where their father obtained his education. In Parma, Ohio, scenes were filmed along Ridge Road, in the old First Merit Bank location and across the street at Mack's Beverage. According to the Russo brothers, editing for Cherry took place as it was filmed to allow them to see what they were missing, and if they needed to "rewrite or reshoot" parts of the film.

== Soundtrack ==
Cherry (An Apple Original Film)

Film score by Henry Jackman
- Released: February 26, 2021
- Recorded: 2021
- Venue: London, England
- Studio: AIR Studios
- Genre: Film score
- Length: 76:09
- Labels: Lakeshore Records; Apple Music
- Producer: Henry Jackman

Henry Jackman chronology
Extraction (Music from the Netflix Film) (2020)	Cherry (An Apple Original Film) (2021)	Ron's Gone Wrong (Original Motion Picture Soundtrack) (2021)

Singles from Cherry (An Apple Original Film)
- 1. "The Comedown" Released: January 15, 2021

The musical score for Cherry was composed by Henry Jackman, who had also previously collaborated with the Russo brothers on the four films in the Marvel Cinematic Universe. The soundtrack for Cherry was recorded at AIR Studios in London, England and was released on February 26, 2021 by Lakeshore Records and Apple Music.

=== Track listing ===
All music is composed by Henry Jackman.

No.	Title	Length
1.	"When Life Was Beginning, I Saw You"	2:51
2.	"Madison"	2:01
3.	"Carnival of Losers, Pt. I"	2:10
4.	"The Elusive Sensation of Bliss"	2:09
5.	"It Was Perfect"	0:43
6.	"A Thing for Weak Guys"	2:19
7.	"Honeymoon"	3:25
8.	"Star-Mangled Banner"	2:26
9.	"Iraq"	5:10
10.	"Triangle of Death"	1:01
11.	"Cheerleaders"	1:05
12.	"Huffers of 1st Platoon"	1:54
13.	"Another Day, Another Mission"	3:15
14.	"Night Tremors"	2:52
15.	"Unholy Retribution"	1:24
16.	"OxyContin"	0:43
17.	"Date Night"	2:51
18.	"Carnival of Losers, Pt. 2"	2:03
19.	"Acquiescence"	2:24
20.	"I'm Your Worst Nightmare"	3:34
21.	"Crossing the Line"	1:34
22.	"Rob Another Bank"	1:57
23.	"Overdose"	2:28
24.	"Your Fate is Darkly Determined"	6:21
25.	"One Last Job"	3:00
26.	"The Comedown"	9:23
27.	"What I'm Trying to Say Is... (Bonus Track)"	5:06
Total length:		76:09

== Release ==
Apple Original Films and Apple TV+ acquired distribution rights to the film in September 2020 for around $40 million. The film was theatrically released on February 26, 2021, and was released on Apple TV+ on March 12, 2021.

== Reception ==
=== Critical response ===
Review aggregator website Rotten Tomatoes reports that 37% of 212 critics gave the film a positive review, with an average rating of 5.20/10. The site's critics consensus reads: "It's certainly stylish and it offers Tom Holland a welcome opportunity to branch out, but Cherry's woes stem from a story that's too formulaic to bowl anyone over." According to Metacritic, which assigned the film a weighted average score of 44 out of 100 based on 45 critics, indicating "mixed or average" reviews.

Writing for IndieWire, David Ehrlich gave the film a grade of D and said, "...directors Anthony and Joe Russo paid [author Nico Walker] $1 million dollars for the film rights and turned it into their first post-Avengers: Endgame production. Suffering through the Russo brothers' scuzzy, interminable, and misjudged adaptation of Walker's life story, there's no question who got the better end of that deal." He further states that Holland was miscast and "radiates so much friendly neighborhood sincerity that he can only wear his character's indifference like it's just another mask."

Owen Gleiberman of Variety said: "There's hardly a moment in Cherry that's believable, but the film's true crime is that there's hardly a moment in it that's enjoyable either. The only emotion the movie conveys is being full of itself," and later named it the worst film of 2021. The Hollywood Reporter's David Rooney called the film "way overripe" and wrote: "Walker's story no doubt is grounded in a very real milieu that reflects the grim existence of countless Americans returning from active duty to a country blighted by economic downturn, shrinking opportunity and substance abuse. But the only reality Cherry reflects with numbing insistence is that of co-directors getting high on their own high style."

Matt Gallagher of The Intercept wrote that both the film and the book it was based upon have been criticized for erasing the actual victims of the crime, such as the bank teller whom Walker allegedly threatened to kill.

=== Awards and accolades ===
Award	Date of ceremony	Category	Recipient(s)	Result	Ref.
Motion Picture Sound Editors Golden Reel Awards	April 16, 2021	Outstanding Achievement in Sound Editing – Sound Effects and Foley for Feature Film	Mark Binder, Donald Flick, Michael Gilbert and Matthew Coby	Nominated	
American Society of Cinematographers Awards	April 18, 2021	Outstanding Achievement in Cinematography in Theatrical Releases	Newton Thomas Sigel	Nominated	
