= Matthew Rhodes =

American film producer

- Education: Ohio University
- Occupation: Film producer
- Years active: 2000–present
- Known for: Cherry; The Voices
- Spouse: Kendall Morgan (m. 2006; div. 2023)

Matthew Rhodes is an American film producer who produced the films Cherry (2021), Mile 22 (2018), The Voices (2014), and Shot Caller (2017). Rhodes formerly ran Bold Films and is the current president of The Hideaway Entertainment.

== Personal life ==
Rhodes grew up in Shaker Heights, Ohio, and graduated with a Bachelor of Arts degree at Ohio University’s School of Telecommunications in Film and Television. He married Kendall Morgan in 2006. Rhodes later moved to Pacific Palisades, California.

== Career ==
Rhodes started out producing for Persistent Entertainment. He later was president for Mandalay Vision and Bold Films before becoming president of The Hideaway Entertainment. In 2021, he signed on to produce a film called Sleep Train by Andrew Nunnelly.

== Filmography ==
Year	Title	Producer	Ref.
2001	The Amati Girls	Yes	
2004	September Tapes	Yes	
2006	Walker Payne	Yes	
2008	Passengers	Yes	
2009	Deep in the Valley	Yes	
2014	The Voices	Yes	
2015	Accidental Love	Yes	
2015	Dark Places	Yes	
2017	Shot Caller	Executive	
2018	Mile 22	Executive	
2018	Time Freak	Yes	
2021	Cherry	Yes	
