= The Hideaway Entertainment =

American film and TV production company

- Type: Private
- Industry: Film production TV production
- Founded: 2017; 9 years ago
- Founder: Jonathan Gray
- Headquarters: Beverly Hills, California, United States
- Area served: Worldwide
- Key people: Jonathan Gray (CEO); Matthew Rhodes (President)
- Products: Motion pictures
- Website: Thehideaway.com

The Hideaway Entertainment is an independent American film and TV production company founded in 2017 by Jonathan Gray and based in Beverly Hills, California. The company's first films produced were Mile 22 (2018), Men in Black: International (2019), Bloodshot (2020), and Cherry (2021).

== History ==
The Hideaway Entertainment was launched in 2017 by the French American entrepreneur Jonathan Gray who hired Matthew Rhodes (former president of Bold Films) as president. The following year, in 2018, the company produced its first film, the action thriller Mile 22, directed by Peter Berg and featuring Mark Wahlberg, John Malkovich and Iko Uwais.

In 2019, Sony Pictures produced Men in Black: International in association with The Hideaway Entertainment. It opened #1 in every country with a worldwide box office of $260 Million. It starred Chris Hemsworth, Liam Neeson, Tessa Thompson, Kumail Nanjiani, Rebecca Ferguson, and Emma Thompson. In 2020, The Hideaway Entertainment produced the film Bloodshot, a sci-fi action film based on the Valiant Entertainment comic book series of the same name starring Vin Diesel as the lead character.

Since 2020, The Hideaway Entertainment expanded from splashy big-budget movies to more intimate film dramas and TV movies and produced the film Cherry, based on the eponymous book, alongside Anthony and Joe Russo, who also directed the film that was released on Apple TV+ in 2021.

Since then, the company has announced several upcoming productions: Freedom Ride (directed by Deon Taylor), the story of a group of young anti-racist activists during the civil rights era in the United States in the 1960s with a script based on the personal stories of early Freedom Riders such as civil rights icon John Lewis; Combat Control (starring Jake Gyllenhaal and directed by Sam Hargrave), the true story of Combat Controller and Medal of Honor recipient John Chapman; Otherwise Illegal Activity (written by Terence Winter), the true story of a convict recruited by anti-terrorist forces to infiltrate a terrorist organization; Sleep Train (written by Andrew Nunnelly), a parenting comedy; Escape (directed by James Watkins), the true story of the escape convicts Robert Greenhill and Alexander Pearce.

== Description ==
The Hideaway Entertainment was founded by Jonathan Gray in 2017 and is presided by Matthew Rhodes. Kristy Grisham is the SVP of development & production. The company tags itself as a "story-driven first" production vehicle which aims to support the creative community.

== Filmography ==
Release date	Title	Directors	Role	Refs
August 17, 2018	Mile 22	Peter Berg	Executive Producer	
June 14, 2019	Men in Black: International	F. Gary Gray	Executive Producer	
March 13, 2020	Bloodshot	David S. F. Wilson	Executive Producer	
February 26, 2021	Cherry	Anthony Russo; Joe Russo	Producer	

=== Upcoming ===
Release date	Title	Directors	Role	Refs
December 25, 2027	Alone at Dawn	Ron Howard	Producer	

=== In development ===
Title	Directors	Role	Refs
Can You Hear Me?	Dean Israelite	Producer	
Combat Control	Sam Hargrave	Producer	
Escape	James Watkins	Producer	
For Those I Loved		Producer	
Freedom Ride	Deon Taylor	Producer	
Level Up		Producer	
Otherwise Illegal Activity		Producer	
Sleep Train		Producer	
The Queen of Fashion	Alex Marx	Producer	
