= Miami Memory =

Studio album by Alex Cameron
- Released: 13 September 2019
- Genres: Soft rock; heartland rock; synth-pop
- Length: 38:39
- Label: Secretly Canadian
- Producer: Jonathan Rado

Alex Cameron chronology
Forced Witness (2017)	Miami Memory (2019)	Oxy Music (2022)

Miami Memory is the third studio album by Australian musician Alex Cameron, released by record label Secretly Canadian on 13 September 2019. Cameron announced the album on 18 June 2019 by releasing the song "Divorce". It was produced by Jonathan Rado of indie rock duo Foxygen, and continues Cameron's style of storytelling from the perspectives of different characters. Largely influenced by Cameron's relationship with actress Jemima Kirke, Miami Memory received generally favorable reviews from critics.

== Music and lyrics ==
"Miami Memory is the story of a couple balancing sex with contemporary family values...It's my gift to my girlfriend, a symbol to hoist on the totem of love."

— Alex Cameron

Miami Memory is defined by Cameron's high-concept songs that tell the stories of different characters in challenging life scenarios, such as sex workers or stepparents. Reviewers noted that unlike his previous two albums, the songs on Miami Memory touch on positive aspects of the characters, as opposed to only satirizing negative elements. Cameron has said that this change is because of his romantic relationship with actress Jemima Kirke.

Lyrically, reviewers have noted similarities to Father John Misty and Randy Newman. "Far from Born Again" is a song that highlights and normalizes the challenges of sex workers. Its music video includes real sex workers who explain their careers. On "Gaslight", Cameron sings about an unhealthy relationship with a manipulative partner. "End is Nigh" is about an alcoholic struggling at twelve-step meetings. "Stepdad" is about a mediocre stepfather explaining why he is leaving his stepson's life.

Musically, the album has a 1980s sound, characterized by Synthesizers, saxophone, and anthemic choruses. Parts of the album sound orchestral and have elements of disco, usually with upbeat melodies. Critics have mentioned the music on the album sounding similar to Steely Dan, Bruce Springsteen, and Brandon Flowers.

== Reception ==
Professional ratings
Aggregate scores
Source	Rating
Metacritic	74/100
Review scores
Source	Rating
AllMusic	3.5/5 stars
PopMatters	8/10 stars
NME	3/5 stars
Exclaim!	8/10
Flood Magazine	7/10
The Line of Best Fit	8/10
The Skinny	4/5 stars
Loud and Quiet	8/10
Paste	8/10
Pitchfork	6.0/10

On Metacritic, which assigns a normalized rating out of 100 to reviews from mainstream publications, Miami Memory has an average score of 74 based on 12 reviews, indicating "generally favorable reviews".

While GQ's Colin Groundwater said that "Miami Memory is an unabashed love record that explores relationships at their most sentimental moments and their wildest extremes", Anna Gaca of Pitchfork said it is "more outrageous than romantic". Writing for Exclaim!, Luke Pearson said that Miami Memory is not as good as Cameron's previous release, Forced Witness, but that it is a "mature and surprisingly au courant album that grapples with complex social issues in a commendably fearless way."

Describing the lyrics, Christopher Laird of PopMatters complimented Cameron on increasing the nuance of his characters, saying, "He's still occupying the same world of people on the fringe of society. But now he seems invested in humanizing what's good in these characters and demonizing what's bad." Writing for Uproxx, Philip Cosores called Miami Memory "a lyrical miracle", saying that "it's all remarkably even-handed and clear-eyed, with Cameron not shying away from being provocative, while proving more than capable with tacking treacherous subjects with surprising grace."

Describing the music, Gaca wrote that "Miami Memory feels like a stuffy reheat of Forced Witness’ groovy ’80s synth-rock". Cosores mentioned that "the sonic manifestation of the songs...might put listeners on guard", referring to elements like "oppressive foghorn keyboard blasts".

Several critics discussed the way that the album addresses women, with Flood Magazine's Lydia Pudzianowski saying that Cameron "is using his third record, Miami Memory, to spotlight and elevate women". Cosores complimented Cameron on this effort, saying that with the song "Far From Born Again", Cameron "seeks to take independent sex work out of the shadows". El Hunt of NME asked rhetorically, "what does Alex Cameron's irony steeped parody of toxic masculinity add to the discussion, beyond demonstrating that he's got some self-awareness?" Hunt added that "women inadvertently feel like the butt of the joke here". On this same topic, Gaca wrote that while the album raises gender issues, it "never reaches in to explore that tension".

=== Accolades ===
Publication	Accolade	Rank	Ref.
Slant Magazine	Top 25 Albums of 2019	9	
Under the Radar	Top 100 Albums of 2019	76	

== Track listing ==
No.	Title	Length
1.	"Stepdad"	4:15
2.	"Miami Memory"	4:25
3.	"Far from Born Again"	4:16
4.	"Gaslight"	4:25
5.	"Bad for the Boys"	4:38
6.	"End Is Nigh"	3:04
7.	"PC with Me"	2:33
8.	"Divorce"	3:12
9.	"Other Ladies"	3:45
10.	"Too Far"	4:06
Total length:		38:39

== Personnel ==
Performance

- Alex Cameron – primary vocals
- Roy Molloy – saxophone
- Richard Barron – accordion
- Kirin J. Callinan – guitar
- Jack Ladder – guitar, bass guitar
- Justin Nijssen – bass guitar, vocals
- Henri Lindstrom – percussion
- Holiday Sidewinder – vocals
- Jackie Cohen – vocals
- Drew Erickson – piano, organ

Design

- Jemima Kirke – design
- Michael Bailey Gates – photography

Production

- Jonathan Rado – producer, guitar, organ, piano, vocals
- Marta Salogni – engineer, mixing
- Tristan Friedberg Rodman – assistant engineer

== Charts ==
Chart (2019)	Peak position
Australian Albums (ARIA)	94
