= Nico Walker =

American author

- Born: Nicholas Walker; April 19, 1985 (age 41)
- Education: John Carroll University
- Occupation: Writer
- Spouses: Kara Walker (m. 2005; div. 2006); Rachel Rabbit White (m. 2020)
- Writing career
- Period: 2018–present
- Notable work: Cherry

Nicholas Walker (born April 19, 1985) is an American author and United States Army veteran who served in the US army and then time in prison for bank robbery. His semi-autobiographical debut novel, Cherry, was published by Alfred A. Knopf on August 14, 2018.

== Career ==
Nicholas Walker was born in the United States on April 19, 1985. From 2005 to 2006, Walker served in the United States Army as a combat medic in Iraq as part of Operation Iraqi Freedom, going on more than 250 combat missions. After being discharged from the military and returning to civilian life, he developed post-traumatic stress disorder and major depressive disorder and became addicted to heroin and Oxycodone. Matthew Johnson, a publisher at Tyrant Books, sent Walker books and encouraged him to write about his life while Walker was in prison. He spent nearly four years writing and rewriting. The resulting novel, Cherry, was published by Alfred A. Knopf and is about "the horrors of war and addiction." In the semi-autobiographical novel, a young man drops out of college and enlists in the Army. He comes home in a poor state, becomes addicted to opiates, and starts robbing banks. According to Vulture.com, upon its publication the book received "near-universal praise." It debuted at number 14 on The New York Times bestseller list. Walker has said that he is using money from sales of the book to pay back some of the banks he robbed. The book was shortlisted for the 2019 Hemingway Foundation/PEN Award. In Walker's acknowledgements in Cherry, he also credits Josh Polikov, Tim O'Connell, Adeline Manson, Anna Kaufman, Daniel Novack, Susan M. S. Brown for helping him write, edit, revise, and publish his semi-autobiographical novel.

Within days of the book's publication, the movie rights were acquired for $1 million by Joe and Anthony Russo's studio AGBO, with the brothers planning to direct and produce, and the script to be written by Jessica Goldberg and starring Tom Holland as the character based on Walker. Walker was offered the opportunity to be an executive producer on the film, but he turned it down. The film, also called Cherry, was released in theaters on February 26, 2021, and on Apple TV+ on March 12, 2021.

== Incarceration ==
To fund his opiate habit, he robbed ten banks around Cleveland in a span of four months, beginning in December 2010. He was arrested in April 2011, pleaded guilty in 2012 and was given an eleven-year sentence. His cellmate was Tony Viola, who was wrongfully accused of mortgage fraud at several banks and was sentenced to twelve and a half years in prison. In 2013, while Walker was behind bars in the Federal Correctional Institution in Ashland, Kentucky, he was profiled in BuzzFeed. This led to a correspondence with Matthew Johnson, a publisher at the independent press Tyrant Books. While incarcerated, Walker was also a GED tutor, teaching fellow inmates.

== Personal life ==
Walker grew up in Atlanta, Las Vegas, and Cleveland. He dropped out of John Carroll University and enlisted in the Army at the age of 19. For his service in Iraq, Walker received seven medals and commendations. He was released from prison early, in October 2019. He lives in Oxford, Mississippi.

Walker and his first wife, Kara, eloped before he deployed in 2005, and divorced a few months after he returned in 2006. Around this time, he was the lead singer and songwriter in a psychedelic garage rock band named Safari, and they released the album Maybe Tomorrow in 2010. In August 2020, Interview reported Walker had married poet Rachel Rabbit White.

As of January 2022, Walker was working on his second novel, which will focus on incarceration.

== Bibliography ==
- Walker, Nico (2018). Cherry. New York: Alfred A. Knopf. ISBN 9780525520139.
