= Jumping the Shark (album) =

Studio album by Alex Cameron
- Released: 2013 (original release)
- Genre: Synth-pop; indie pop; electronica; lo-fi; glam rock
- Length: 30:56
- Label: Siberia Records (2014 release); Secretly Canadian (2016 re-release)

Alex Cameron chronology
Jumping the Shark (2013)	Forced Witness (2017)

Jumping the Shark is the debut studio album by Australian musician Alex Cameron, initially released for free on Cameron's website in 2013. The album was released physical on Siberia Records on 18 April 2014, while a subsequent re-release on Secretly Canadian was issued on 19 August 2016.

== Writing and composition ==
Despite Cameron's musical persona of that of a struggling entertainer, he notes that the album's lyrics are in part influenced by his own life and those of his friends and family: "It’s based on a sense of self-pity that can be generated inside someone from inactivity and/or high ambition. [...] We’re expecting a lot of ourselves in terms of work, rate, and degrees of success, so it’s just our way of commenting on the vast feeling of sadness you can experience if you don’t match those expectations with work. The songs are all based on things that have happened to me or [live saxophonist] Roy, or our friends and family, of what just altered them to fit into this one singular world where these stories trail on or mark the other."

== Track listing ==
No.	Title	Length
1.	"Happy Ending"	4:03
2.	"Gone South"	3:19
3.	"Real Bad Lookin"	4:33
4.	"The Comeback"	4:19
5.	"She's Mine"	3:22
6.	"Internet"	3:33
7.	"Mongrel"	3:37
8.	"Take Care of Business"	4:07
