= Forced Witness =

Studio album by Alex Cameron
- Released: 8 September 2017
- Genres: Synth-pop; indie rock
- Length: 41:00
- Label: Secretly Canadian
- Producers: Alex Cameron, Jonathan Rado

Alex Cameron chronology
Jumping the Shark (2013)	Forced Witness (2017)	Miami Memory (2019)

Professional ratings
Aggregate scores
Source	Rating
AnyDecentMusic?	7.1/10
Metacritic	69/100
Review scores
Source	Rating
AllMusic	3.5/5 stars
Exclaim!	6/10
Flood Magazine	9/10
The Line of Best Fit	7.5/10
Loud and Quiet	9/10
Pitchfork	7.8/10
Q	2/5 stars
Record Collector	3/5 stars
Tiny Mix Tapes	3/5
Uncut	8/10

Forced Witness is the second studio album by Australian musician Alex Cameron. It was released by record label Secretly Canadian on 8 September 2017, and includes songs featuring Brandon Flowers and Angel Olsen. The album is defined by Cameron's characteristic 1980s instrumentation and first-person storytelling. It received moderately positive reviews from critics.

== Track listing ==
No.	Title	Length
1.	"Candy May"	4:08
2.	"Country Figs"	4:11
3.	"Runnin' Outta Luck" (featuring Brandon Flowers)	3:51
4.	"Stranger's Kiss" (featuring Angel Olsen)	4:01
5.	"True Lies"	3:52
6.	"Studmuffin96"	3:15
7.	"The Chihuahua"	4:06
8.	"The Hacienda"	4:31
9.	"Marlon Brando"	4:44
10.	"Politics of Love"	4:31
Total length:		41:00

== Personnel ==
Performance

- Alex Cameron - primary vocals, drums and percussion (1, 2, 3, 10), Korg M1 (9).
- Roy Molloy - saxophone
- Angel Olsen - featured artist

Production

- Jonathan Rado - producer, engineering
- Brandon Flowers - engineering, featured artist
- Joel Ford - additional production, engineering
- Jacknife Lee - additional production, engineering
- Robert Root - engineering
- Marta Salogni - mixing
- Richard Swift - mixing
- Jacob Portrait - mixing
- Christian Bader - mixing

Design

- Bryan McLeod - design
- Nathaniel David Utesch - design
- Britt McCamey - photography
