= Greater Cleveland Film Commission =

Private non-profit organization

- Type: 501(c) non-profit
- Industry: Film
- Founded: 1998
- Headquarters: Cleveland, Ohio
- Key people: Chris Carmody-President (1998-2007), Ivan Schwarz-President (2007-2019), Evan Miller-President (2019-2020), Bill Garvey-President (2021-)
- Website: https://www.clevelandfilm.com/

The Greater Cleveland Film Commission (GCFC) is a 501(c)(3) private non-profit organization, also known as the Greater Cleveland Media Development Corporation. Its purpose is to bring jobs and economic impact to Northeast Ohio through the growth of a sustainable media production industry. It attempts this through a program of attraction, advocacy, and workforce development.

== History ==
The Greater Cleveland Film Commission was founded in 1998 by its first President, Chris Carmody. Early on, the city attracted several independent productions like Welcome to Collinwood, Antwone Fisher and American Splendor. However, in the mid-2000s, it became readily apparent that for Cleveland, and Ohio, to compete with other states, a tax incentive would need to be implemented to lure productions away from other more established production centers.

In 2006, Ivan Schwarz was named the new president and CEO of GCFC. Schwarz began the long process of lobbying for some sort of financial incentive for the media industry in Ohio. In 2009, Ohio passed the Ohio Motion Picture Tax Credit, largely due to the efforts of Schwarz and GCFC.

Since the inception of the Ohio Motion Picture Tax Incentive program in 2009, Northeast Ohio has hosted over 300 motion picture productions including Marvel's "The Avengers" (2012) & "Captain America: Winter Soldier" (2014), Universal's "Fate of the Furious" (2017), Warner Bros' "Superman" (2025), and other productions ranging from independent features from local filmmakers to Academy Award winning high-profile features. In 2025, the GCFC successfully lobbied the Ohio Legislature to raise the Incentive's cap to $50 million, up from $40 million.
