= Maxim Ludwig =

American singer-songwriter (born 1988)

- Genres: Roots rock; soul; funk
- Years active: 2009–present
- Labels: Hit City U.S.A.
- Website: http://www.maximludwig.com/

Maxim Ludwig (born October 22, 1988) is an American singer-songwriter from Los Angeles.

== Career ==
=== Early career ===
Ludwig began his musical career in the band Maxim Ludwig & The Santa Fe Seven, an Americana rock band centered around himself. The band undertook many transformations since their first appearance at the Stagecoach Festival in 2009. Significant buzz surrounded Ludwig around this time, with Los Angeles Times music critic August Brown pleading in an article that "someone sign Maxim Ludwig by the end of the day" and writing that his songs "have all the swagger of the E Street Band, if that E Street were in 1970s Laurel Canyon and gently tweaked hippies drove it riding in stolen Cadillacs". Meanwhile, the Times' Randy Lewis compared the importance of Ludwig's shows to seeing Buffalo Springfield's early gigs, describing him as being "deeply schooled in the art of Americana music stalwarts such as Bob Dylan, the Band, Gram Parsons-era Byrds/Flying Burrito Brothers and the twangiest leanings of the Rolling Stones". Ludwig was the opening act and supported Robert Francis on his "Heaven" tour in 2013.

=== 2015–present ===
In 2015, Ludwig released two singles as a solo act under Hit City U.S.A.: "All My Nightmares" and "Assembly Line". In an interview with Ludwig, Indie Current called the new singles "excellent blends of rock, jazz, and soul".

The two tracks are also included on Ludwig's debut solo album Libra-Scorpio Cusp, released June 2, 2017. When reviewing his new material, the Los Angeles Times said "Ludwig's eclecticism is still in force ... with a grunge-inspired foundation, a catchy and melodic core surrounded by left-field touches from distorted harmonica and neo-psychedelic production" and Billboard described him as being "on the road to success", comparing his sound to David Bowie, Prince and Bruce Springsteen.
