= Bloodshot (film) =

2020 film by David S. F. Wilson

- Theatrical release poster
- Directed by: David S. F. Wilson
- Screenplay by: Jeff Wadlow; Eric Heisserer
- Story by: Jeff Wadlow
- Based on: Bloodshot by: Kevin VanHook; Don Perlin; Bob Layton
- Produced by: Neal H. Moritz; Toby Jaffe; Dinesh Shamdasani; Vin Diesel
- Starring: Vin Diesel; Eiza González; Sam Heughan; Toby Kebbell; Talulah Riley; Lamorne Morris; Guy Pearce
- Cinematography: Jacques Jouffret
- Edited by: Jim May
- Music by: Steve Jablonsky
- Production companies: Columbia Pictures; Bona Film Group; Cross Creek Pictures; Original Film; Annabell Pictures; The Hideaway Entertainment; One Race Films; Valiant Entertainment
- Distributed by: Sony Pictures Releasing
- Release dates: March 10, 2020 (Regency Village Theatre); March 13, 2020 (United States)
- Running time: 109 minutes
- Countries: United States; China
- Language: English
- Budget: $45 million
- Box office: $39.9 million

Bloodshot is a 2020 superhero film starring Vin Diesel. Based on the Valiant Comics character Bloodshot, it follows a soldier who was killed in action, only to be brought back to life with superpowers by an organization that wants to use him as a weapon. The film was directed by David S. F. Wilson and written by Jeff Wadlow and Eric Heisserer.Eiza González, Sam Heughan, Toby Kebbell, Lamorne Morris, and Guy Pearce appear in supporting roles.

It is intended to be the first installment in a series of films set within a Valiant Comics shared cinematic universe. Bloodshot premiered at the Regency Village Theatre in Westwood, Los Angeles on March 10, 2020, and was theatrically released in the United States on March 13, by Sony Pictures Releasing. The weekend of its release coincided with the onset of the COVID-19 pandemic when societal restrictions and regulations led to mass theater closures around the world. The film grossed $37.3 million worldwide, but due to the theater closures, Sony made the film available on video on demand less than two weeks after it was released theatrically. The film received generally negative reviews from critics, with criticism for Diesel's performance, but praise for the action sequences and the visual effects.

== Plot ==
After leading a successful rescue operation of hostages in Mombasa, U.S. Marine Ray Garrison and his wife Gina travel for a holiday at an Italian beachside town in the Amalfi Coast. They are kidnapped by a group of mercenaries led by Martin Ax, who demands to know how the US military learned about the hostages and their location. When Ray explains that he cannot answer, Ax executes Gina with a Captive bolt pistol in front of him. Ray vows revenge, and Ax kills Ray as well.

An amnesiac Ray awakens in the labs of Rising Spirit Technologies (RST), a company in Kuala Lumpur specializing in cybernetic enhancements for disabled US military personnel. CEO and lead scientist Dr. Emil Harting tells Ray he is the first successful human subject of the "Bloodshot" program, resurrecting and healing him through the injection of experimental nanite technology now replacing his entire bloodstream. This technology increases his strength and heals his injuries, but the nanites need to be regularly replaced and recharged or he will eventually succumb to damage and die again.

Ray is introduced to Dr. Harting's other patients, including former U.S. Navy Diver "KT", former U.S. Army Ranger Marcus Tibbs, and ex-Navy SEAL Jimmy Dalton. After experiencing flashbacks of Gina and Ax, Ray abruptly leaves to avenge Gina's death.

Using the nanites and RST servers to hack into databases, Ray tracks Ax to Budapest and kills him along with his bodyguards. Back at RST, Ray is put to sleep as his nanites are rebooted. As he has done many times before, Harting replaces Ray's memories with a new scenario of how Gina died, this time with his own former associate at RST, Nick Baris, as the culprit. KT objects to Harting repeatedly manipulating Ray's memories so he will go after different targets without question or remorse, but she is ignored and reminded that RST can kill her by deactivating her enhancements.

Ray awakens, once again amnesiac, and is re-introduced to RST. He then experiences flashbacks of Baris kidnapping and killing him and Gina. Driven by revenge, he tracks Baris to East Sussex and kills him, despite the man pleading that RST is lying. Wilfred Wigans, a programmer forced to work for Baris, activates an EMP bomb that incapacitates Ray and severs his link with RST.

Ray awakens in Wigans's office and experiences multiple contradicting memories of who killed Gina. Wigans helps him realize RST has been manipulating him so he would kill Harting's former associates. Ray tracks down Gina, not only learning she is actually still alive, but that their relationship ended five years ago, and she has since started a new life and family in London.

Harting sends KT after Wigans, but after KT asks Wigans for help in freeing herself from RST's control and taking down the corporation, she returns to RST and tells Harting she failed to capture the programmer. Meanwhile, Ray is recaptured by Dalton and Tibbs and brought back to the laboratory. KT and Wigans sabotage the reprogramming process and destroy the RST computers. Ray awakens, but Dalton and Tibbs try to subdue him.

After a lengthy battle, Ray kills them as the RST building collapses. Harting confronts him with a grenade launcher, confident that the soldier will surrender now that his nanites have been exhausted. To his surprise, Ray is willing to die to achieve victory and activates a grenade that the nanites deconstructed, killing them both.

Ray later awakes with his full memories, revived by Wigans who has updated his technology so that his nanites are self-sufficient. They and KT then leave in search of a new life.

== Cast ==
- Vin Diesel as Ray Garrison / Bloodshot
- Eiza González as KT
- Sam Heughan as Jimmy Dalton
- Toby Kebbell as Martin Ax
- Talulah Riley as Gina Garrison
- Lamorne Morris as Wilfred Wigans
- Guy Pearce as Dr. Emil Harting
- Jóhannes Haukur Jóhannesson as Nick Baris
- Alex Hernandez as Marcus Tibbs
- Siddharth Dhananjay as Eric
- Keeno-Lee Hector as Lead Technician
- Charles Bouguenon as Merc leader

== Production ==
=== Development ===
In March 2015, it was announced that Columbia Pictures had acquired the film rights to the Valiant Comics character Bloodshot, which would be produced by Original Film and Valiant Entertainment. Jeff Wadlow was hired to write the screenplay. In April 2015, Sony Pictures, Original Film and Valiant announced a five-picture deal to bring Valiant Comics' superheroes to the big screen, including Bloodshot. Chad Stahelski and David Leitch were hired to direct the film, from a screenplay by Wadlow and Eric Heisserer. Stahelski and Leitch eventually passed on the project. In March 2017, Dave Wilson was announced as the director of the film. Screenwriter Adam Cozad later contributed to the script.

=== Casting ===
In July 2017, it was reported that Jared Leto was in early negotiations to star in the film as Bloodshot, but in March 2018, it was announced that Vin Diesel would portray the main character. By May, additional cast members were announced, with Sam Heughan, Michael Sheen, and Eiza González. In June of the same year, Talulah Riley and Alex Hernandez were cast in the film to play Gina and Tibbs, respectively. Later, Toby Kebbell and Johannes Haukur Johannesson were both cast in villainous roles, with the former playing Ax. In August 2018, Lamorne Morris was hired to play Wilfred Wigans. In the same month, it was reported that Guy Pearce was in talks to replace Sheen, who had to exit the movie due to scheduling and family conflicts. In an interview for Inverse, Shamdasani, the longtime Valiant Comics publisher's CEO and Chief Creative Officer, said that Ken Watanabe would play the Harbinger villain Toyo Harada in a post credit scene, but because of a change of copyright it was not possible to film the cameo.

=== Filming ===
Principal photography began on August 6, 2018, in Cape Town, South Africa, and Prague, Czech Republic, with other filming taking place in Budapest, Hungary, in that same month. Filming officially wrapped on October 25, 2018.

=== Music ===
Steve Jablonsky has composed the film score. Sony Classical has released the soundtrack.

== Release ==
Bloodshot had its world premiere at the Regency Village Theatre in Westwood on March 10, 2020. The film was then released in the United States on March 13, 2020, by Sony Pictures Releasing, after previously being scheduled to be released on February 21, 2020. It also opened in the United Kingdom, Ireland, India, and Spain on the same day.

On March 18, Sony confirmed that due to movie theater closures because of the COVID-19 pandemic restrictions, the film would be released digitally through video on demand in the United States and Canada on March 24, 2020. This was just two weeks after the film's theatrical debut and before the end of the usual 90-day theatrical run. Over its first three days of home release, Bloodshot was the most watched film on Amazon Prime Video and fourth-most on iTunes. Despite the pandemic's effects on the film's box office return, Bloodshot was ranked number one on Digital Entertainment Group's "Watched at Home Top 20" list for the week ending May 9, 2020.

As the pandemic receded, the film was released in three Santikos Theatres locations in San Antonio, Texas, on May 1, 2020. In China, the film was released on July 24, 2020. In August 2020, AMC Theatres announced that the film would resume showing in theaters upon their reopening that month.

== Reception ==
=== Box office ===
Bloodshot grossed $10 million in the United States and Canada, and $27.2 million in other territories, for a worldwide total of $37.1 million, against a production budget of $45 million.

In the United States and Canada, the film was released alongside The Hunt and I Still Believe, and was projected to gross around $10 million from 2,861 theaters in its opening weekend. The film made $3.8 million on its first day, including $1.2 million from Thursday night previews. It went on to debut to $9.3 million, finishing second at the box office behind holdover Onward. The weekend was also noteworthy for being the lowest combined-grossing since October 1998, with all films totaling just $55.3 million, in large part from societal restrictions and regulations due to the COVID-19 pandemic. In the film's second weekend, due to the mass theater closures around the country, the film made $52,000 from 79 locations, mostly drive-in theaters.

After months of delays, the film was released in China on July 24, and made $2.8 million in its opening weekend.

=== Critical response ===
On Rotten Tomatoes, the film holds an approval rating of 31% based on 169 reviews, with an average rating of 4.6/10. The site's critics consensus reads: "Bloodshot gives Vin Diesel a solid opportunity to indulge in old-school action that should satisfy fans, even if the end result is disappointingly mediocre." On Metacritic, the film has a weighted average score of 44 out of 100, based on 35 critics, indicating "mixed or average" reviews. Audiences polled by CinemaScore gave the film an average grade of "B" on an A+ to F scale, while filmgoers at PostTrak gave the film an average 3 out of 5 stars, with 45% saying they would definitely recommend it.

Owen Gleiberman of Variety wrote: "Bloodshot is a trash compactor of a comic-book film, but it's smart trash, an action matrix that's fun to plug into." Justin Lowe of The Hollywood Reporter gave the film a mixed review, saying "[director] Wilson acquits himself adequately enough, emphasizing pacing over character development, but delivering a series of kinetically propelled scenes that clearly benefit from his extensive visual effects experience." Richard Roeper of the Chicago Sun-Times gave the film 2 out of 4 stars, calling it ambitious but "intermittently entertaining" and "frantically overcooked, bursting with headache-inducing, rapid-cut action sequences".

Angelica Jade Bastien at Vulture.com was critical of Diesel's performance: "At this point, what could have been a passably entertaining diversion, the kind of film best enjoyed overcoming a hangover or while folding laundry, falls flat on Diesel's lips. He lacks the gravitas of delivery, disinterested in his lines even before he finishes saying them." Joshua Rivera of The Verge wrote: "As an action movie, Bloodshot is the worst kind of uninspiring: not bad enough to circle back around toward fun, not good enough at action to be even momentarily impressed by a fight scene." Odie Henderson at RogerEbert.com called it a "Universal Soldier rip-off", and hoped there would not be any sequels.

=== Accolades ===
Award	Date of ceremony	Category	Recipient(s)	Result	Ref.
Visual Effects Society Awards	April 6, 2021	Outstanding Created Environment in a Photoreal Feature	Arbanud Brisebois, Patrick Bacon, Dawid Borkiewicz, Gérôme Viavant (for Neurospace)	Nominated	
Visual Effects Society Awards	April 6, 2021	Outstanding Effects Simulations in a Photoreal Feature	Omar Meradi, Jeremy Poupin, Sylvain Robert, Deak Ferrand	Nominated	
Saturn Awards	October 26, 2021	Best Comic to Motion Picture Release		Nominated	

== Future ==
Intended to be the launch of a new shared cinematic universe of Valiant Comics superheroes, Bloodshot was conceived to be followed by a sequel, two films based on the comic book series Harbinger, and then a crossover film titled Harbinger Wars. Though a Harbinger movie was initially scheduled to be the first installment in the franchise, development was delayed in favor of Bloodshot.

The future of the franchise was questioned by various outlets, due to the moderate box office and critical reception.

In September 2019, it was announced that Harbinger would be distributed by Paramount Pictures. In March 2020, director David S. F. Wilson stated that even though different film studios have distribution rights, Valiant still plans to build a franchise from Bloodshot, acknowledging that Diesel will play a large role in the future of the planned film series. In November 2020, a Bloodshot sequel was officially announced as being in development, with Diesel intended to reprise his role. By December of the same year, Diesel confirmed his involvement with the project.
