= Rachel Rabbit White =

American poet

Rachel Rabbit White is an American poet, journalist, and former sex worker based in New York City.

She is the author of Porn Carnival (2019), reissued as Porn Carnival: Paradise Edition (2020), and Work For Love (Triangle House)
