= The Path (TV series) =

2010s American drama TV series

- Genre: Drama
- Created by: Jessica Goldberg
- Starring: Aaron Paul; Michelle Monaghan; Emma Greenwell; Rockmond Dunbar; Kyle Allen; Amy Forsyth; Sarah Jones; Hugh Dancy
- Composer: Will Bates
- Country of origin: United States
- Original language: English
- No. of seasons: 3
- No. of episodes: 36

Production
- Executive producers: Jason Katims; Michelle Lee; Jessica Goldberg
- Producers: Aaron Paul; Michelle Monaghan; Hugh Dancy; Devin Rich; Diana Schmidt
- Camera setup: Single-camera
- Running time: 46–56 minutes
- Production companies: True Jack Productions; Refuge, Inc.; Universal Television

Original release
- Network: Hulu
- Release: March 30, 2016 – March 28, 2018

The Path is an American drama television series created by Jessica Goldberg, and starring Aaron Paul, Michelle Monaghan, and Hugh Dancy. The show portrays members of a fictional religion known as Meyerism.

The series was ordered by Hulu in March 2015, with a straight 10-episode order, and debuted on March 30, 2016. Its original title, The Way, was changed to The Path in September 2015, due to its similarity to that of the real-life ministry and alleged cult, The Way International.

On May 4, 2016, Hulu renewed the series for a second season, which premiered on January 25, 2017. On April 12, 2017, Hulu renewed the series for a 13-episode third season, which premiered on January 17, 2018. On April 23, 2018, Jessica Goldberg announced via Twitter that The Path would not be renewed for a fourth season.

== Premise ==
Eddie Lane lives in Upstate New York with his wife, Sarah, and their two children, Hawk and Summer. They are all members of the Meyerist Movement, which combines aspects of New Age philosophy, shamanism, Scientology, Christian mysticism, and Utopianism with a few elements from the Shakers, Sufism, Tibetan Buddhism, Jehovah's Witnesses and Freemasonry rituals.

Eddie returns from a spiritual retreat in Peru designed to advance him up Meyerism's spiritual ladder. Unbeknown to his family, Eddie experienced a revelation while in Peru which causes him to question his faith in Meyerism. Meanwhile, Cal Roberts, a friend of Sarah's and one of Meyerism's top leaders, is looking to expand the group's influence and deal with the imminent death of their founder, Doctor Stephen Meyer.

=== Meyerism ===
Meyerism is a fictional movement founded by Stephen Meyer. In the show's mythology, on October 28, 1974, Meyer literally climbed a ladder of burning light atop Huayna Picchu to receive the message of universal truth. He then gave to his followers the instructions for their spiritual development, written in the first book of Meyerism, The Ladder.

Meyerists believe that all people are damaged, which is the cause of the world's suffering. Through personal enlightenment, they seek awareness of suffering in themselves and others, the need to heal the world, the family, humanity, and the environment, and to create here on earth the heavenly Garden of Meyer's vision. However, The Ladder foretells that their efforts will be thwarted by non-believers or Ignorant Systemites (I.S.), whose selfish actions will result in an apocalypse, although those who ascend The Ladder of Enlightenment will live forever in The Garden.

The Movement claims 6000 members and has facilities located in San Diego, California, and Parksdale, New York, and a retreat center located in Cusco, Peru. Throughout the series, particularly in season 3, the movement expands to additional cities and countries. Most members practice Meyerism in their everyday lives and live off-site, while others live in Meyerist intentional communities, have taken vows of service, and dedicate themselves to counseling, recruitment, and outreach programs. However, the founder, Stephen Meyer, warned against media attention and advised that the movement should remain small and publicity kept to a minimum.

Spiritual progress is evaluated on an ascending series of rungs from 1R to 10R, and many decisions are made by the senior membership (i.e., Upper Rungs (U.R.'s)).

Meyerists practice meditation and use biofeedback devices and drugs such as ayahuasca and cannabis to reach deeper levels of consciousness. They believe that The Light communicates with them through visions and intuition.

A Vanity Fair analysis of the show's first episode describes Meyerism as "inspired by a grab bag of religious practices and cult beliefs". The show's creator, Jessica Goldberg, specifically refutes comparisons to Scientology.

== Cast and characters ==
=== Main ===
- Aaron Paul as Eddie Lane: A convert to Meyerism with a wayward past. Eddie suffers a crisis of faith when all that he has come to accept as truth is fundamentally challenged.
- Hugh Dancy as Calvin "Cal" Roberts: The charismatic, unofficial leader of The Meyerist Movement. His ambition puts him at odds with the organization's existing leadership, and roils Sarah and Eddie's already turbulent marriage.
- Michelle Monaghan as Sarah Lane (née Armstrong): Born into a Meyerist family, Sarah's compassion and authority have made her an important figure in The Movement. Her devotion, however, is tested when she uncovers her husband's falsehoods.
- Emma Greenwell as Mary Cox: An addict who's been saved by Cal and a team of Meyerists after a tornado leveled her hometown. Now freed from a life of abuse, she becomes infatuated with Cal and devotes herself entirely to The Movement.
- Rockmond Dunbar as Agent Abe Gaines (seasons 1–2): An FBI investigator who seems to be the only agent suspicious of the mysterious religious sect that recently responded to a natural disaster. As he delves deeper into the investigation, he faces personal troubles at home and is forced to reflect on his own faith.
- Kyle Allen as Hawk Lane: Eddie and Sarah's devoted teenage son who wants to drop out of high school, where he is constantly attacked for his Meyerist faith, and join The Movement full-time. His loyalty wavers when a popular classmate pursues a relationship with him.
- Amy Forsyth as Ashley Fields (starring season 1; recurring season 2): A popular girl at Hawk's school who would normally have nothing to do with "a weird cult kid". After a financial crisis hits home, she turns to Hawk and his family for help.
- Sarah Jones as Alison Kemp (season 1): A defector from Meyerism who holds The Movement responsible for the mysterious death of her husband. She employs Eddie's help in a search for answers and redemptions.
- Paul James as Sean Egan (recurring season 1, starring season 2): A novice member of the Meyerist Movement who begins to date Mary when she joins the Movement. Sean's sister was shot and killed in a school shooting, which led him to join the Movement.
- Freida Pinto as Vera Stephans (season 3): Eddie's publicist.

=== Recurring ===
- Raúl Esparza as Jackson Neill
- Clark Middleton as Richard
- Minka Kelly as Miranda Frank
- Keir Dullea as Stephen Meyer
- Peter Friedman as Hank Armstrong
- Deirdre O'Connell as Gab Armstrong
- Brian Stokes Mitchell as Bill
- Adriane Lenox as Felicia
- Patch Darragh as Russel Armstrong
- Ali Ahn as Nicole Armstrong
- Stephanie Hsu as Joy Armstrong
- Allison Layman as Shelby
- Steve Mones as Silas
- Kathleen Turner as Brenda Roberts
- Aimee Laurence as Summer Lane
- James Remar as Kodiak
- Britne Oldford as Noa
- Michael Countryman as John Ridge
- Kaili Vernoff as Kerry Ridge
- Matt Bailey as Mark Penetti
- Max Ehrich as Freddie Ridge
- Jeb Brown as Wesley Cox
- Leven Rambin as Chloe Jones
- Whitney Crowder as Betsy
- Ali Marsh as Meg Fields
- Alexa Landeau as Tessa
- Vincent Kartheiser as Congressman Buck Harbaugh
- Titus Makin Jr. as Caleb Matthews
- Sam Atlas as Kid in Tank

== Episodes ==
=== Series overview ===
Season	Episodes	Originally aired	
Season	Episodes	First aired	Last aired
1	10	March 30, 2016	May 25, 2016
2	13	January 25, 2017	April 12, 2017
3	13	January 17, 2018	March 28, 2018

=== Season 1 (2016) ===
No. overall	No. in season	Title	Directed by	Written by	Original release date
1	1	"What the Fire Throws"	Mike Cahill	Jessica Goldberg	March 30, 2016
Eddie Lane's mental health and connection to his family are threatened when a ceremony of his adopted religion, Meyerism, goes awry and shakes his faith. In Peru after taking ayahuasca, he sees his dead brother, who guides him to a hidden room where Meyerism's founder Steve Meyer lies comatose in a hospital bed, with the instructions for their salvation incomplete. Meyer claims to have climbed a burning heavenly ladder to ascend to "the Light". As Meyerists are taught to believe that Steve will eventually become one with the Light, the revelation that he is but mortal is intensely disturbing. At the library, Eddie reads a website saying, "Meyerism is lying", that the current leadership is straying from the Light. Eddie's wife Sarah, a lifelong Meyerist and high-ranking counselor, believes her husband had an affair in Peru, and she becomes more suspicious when she tails him to a midnight meeting at a motel. In reality, Eddie is secretly conferring with website author Alison Kemp, a banished ex-member "denier" who might understand him. Meanwhile, Cal Roberts, who has always been in love with Sarah, arrives to take leadership of the eastern region. His first effort is to evacuate desperate people from a tornado-stricken trailer park to the Meyerist compound, where they are helped but also indoctrinated. Trailer park resident Mary Cox, who has been sexually abused since childhood, offers her body to Cal. Though aroused and tempted, Cal refuses her advances and later takes her to the trailer park, where he brutally beats her abusive father.
2	2	"The Era of the Ladder"	Mike Cahill	Jessica Goldberg	March 30, 2016
Sarah and Eddie begin the Infidelity Rehab Program, but he won't confess to an affair. He meets Alison again and considers continuing to pay lip service to Meyerism despite his lack of faith, but she angrily claims that the Meyerists killed her husband Jason, the community's doctor in Peru, for trying to leave. She believes Meyerist enforcers are following her, and are trying to kill her. Later Eddie finds out that Jason's official cause of death was suicide. Eddie's son Hawk gets in a fight at school over popular-girl Ashley, who turned to Hawk as her family are about to lose their home. Ashley's father recently died and her mother is unable to cope with their coming eviction. For his family's sake, Eddie undergoes 14 days of more intense Infidelity Rehab, isolation and gruelling interrogation, by the end of which he has falsely confessed to having had an affair with Miranda Franks, the assistant at Eddie's ceremony in Peru. Miranda is kidnapped and thrown into a cell on the Meyerist compound. Cal breaks Meyerist protocol to appear on the local news, raising his public profile. Cal demands the faith of wealthy John Ridge, whose son Freddie is dragged from his home and brought to the Meyer community for their drug rehab program. Cal deflects Mary's sexual advances by suggesting that she cultivate her relationship with fellow novice Sean as they pass out literature to recruit more followers. FBI Detective Abe Gaines puts the Meyerists on cult watch.
3	3	"A Homecoming"	Michael Weaver	Annie Weisman	April 6, 2016
Meyer has liver cancer and his tumour hasn't responded to treatment. He has not written his Last Will and Testament and he has no next of kin. If he dies without having written the last 3 Rungs of the Ladder, the Meyerist movement will be in crisis. Cal visits Meyer frequently with founding members Bill, Felicia, and the Peruvian shaman Silas, but he pretends to the membership that Steve is well and working. He tells Sarah only that Meyer is "moving on", and the final Rungs of the Ladder are about the succession of leadership. Miranda Franks, kidnapped against protocol, is still in Realignment Lockdown but won't confess to an affair with Eddie. Sarah furiously browbeats Miranda and refuses to believe she is innocent. Miranda later collapses in her cell and is taken to a hospital. Trying to keep his family together, Eddie cuts ties with Alison and responds angrily when he finds her outside his home. Cal visits his vicious, alcoholic mother Brenda and breaks two years of sobriety as she makes going into an assisted living facility conditional upon his drinking with her. Sarah comforts him, as she is familiar with Cal's struggles with alcoholism and his mother's cruelty. Detective Gaines, believing that the Meyerists are guilty of murder, convinces Mary's father to delay pressing charges against Cal for the beating until he can build a bigger case against the Meyerists.
4	4	"The Future"	Michael Weaver	Julia Brownell	April 13, 2016
Miranda confides in Cal what really happened on Eddie's retreat: he saw his brother, went somewhere, and returned weeping and saying, "There is no Light", and she embraced him merely out of concern; the shaman Silas then counseled him privately. Convincing her that she's to blame for the "misunderstanding", Cal removes Miranda from the hospital. Cal offers to be Eddie's guide for the next level, 7R, which permits no secrets between them. Founding members Bill and Felicia arrive for Ascension Day festivities. Sarah cautions the Ridges not to be too optimistic about Freddie's apparent progress after only two weeks' rehab, but John pulls his son out when he learns Sarah is giving him ayahuasca. Sarah later rescues Freddie from a drug den, and sends Freddie and his desperate mother Kerry to Cuzco to do the ceremony properly, disobeying Cal's orders. At the Ascension Day celebration, Mary publicly reveals her father's sexual abuse and is comforted by the whole assembly, giving Detective Gaines second thoughts. Bill and Felicia warn Cal to check his ambitions, blaming him for Alison Kemp's outspoken hostility and the abuse of Miranda. Cal shows that he's convinced Miranda to blame herself, that he alone has the charisma to attract new members, and that he will write the last three rungs himself. Bill and Felicia warn that Silas will never agree to this. They leave with Miranda and ask Eddie to keep an eye on Cal. Hawk and Ashley's attraction intensifies, and despite his cousin Joy's warning, he kisses Ashley at a field party.
5	5	"The Hole"	Patrick Norris	Coleman Herbert	April 20, 2016
Hawk's relationship with Ashley comes out and Sarah is terrified that he might choose to leave Meyerism, "choosing to be ignorant" and unable to reunite with the family in The Garden. Hawk pretends to break up with Ashley but sneaks out to meet her at night. John Ridge angrily demands Cal return his wife and son from Peru. Cal is initially irate with Sarah for ignoring his orders but later defends her actions to Ridge. Ridge's bodyguard brutally beats Cal. Meanwhile Silas guides Freddie and Kerry through a vision, drawing them closer together. Cal demands that Eddie dig a huge hole in the woods as a spiritual exercise. Mary and Sean have sex and begin to fall in love. She considers leaving the compound when Cal is dismissive of her, but Sean convinces her to stay. Detective Gaines questions Alison about her husband's death and she admits that he'd been on "secret missions" to Cuzco, confided his doubts of Meyer doctrine, and told her, "This is the last time". Gaines advises her to leave the area and says the FBI will investigate. Gaines learns that his infant daughter Lucy has a condition that might require surgery, and he receives advice from Eddie.
6	6	"Breaking and Entering"	Patrick Norris	Jessica Goldberg	April 27, 2016
Eddie pretends to join Cal in searching Alison Kemp's hotel room, but Eddie conceals her from her pursuers. Alison later admits to stealing $40k intended for Jason's secret missions, so the Meyerists are actually seeking her out for her own crime. Nevertheless, she feels she is owed the money for all the harassment she has endured. Sarah confronts Cal about intimidating the widow, and Cal admits to Eddie that it was a mistake. Ashley's family is evicted, and Hawk convinces Sarah to shelter them temporarily. Ashley's mother Meg explains how her husband died, and the family interprets it through Meyerism, takes them to an inspirational lecture from Cal, and gets her a job. However, Ashley realizes her estranged father would have no place in the Meyerist afterlife. Hawk consoles her, and they have sex. Cal is both attracted to and repelled by Mary and is jealous of her relationship with Sean, so Cal transfers him to a different Meyerist center. As he is packing to leave, Mary claims that she first dated Sean on Cal's instructions but now loves him and not Cal. Detective Gaines learns that Jason was trying to buy late-stage cancer medications. Sarah sneaks into the well-appointed home of her estranged sister, Tessa, who left Meyerism almost 20 years before, and finds a half-dozen prescription sedatives. Cal takes in a group of undocumented Honduran immigrants, causing a controversy both within the Meyerist and local communities.
7	7	"Refugees"	Roxann Dawson	Jason Katims	May 4, 2016
Police, the media, and protestors descend on the Meyerist community concerning the Honduran immigrants. Bill and Felicia work with the Upper Rung council to arrange the surrender of the Hondurans behind closed doors, but Cal unilaterally calls for the entire membership to vote openly later. Caught sheltering Alison, Eddie admits to Cal what he saw in Peru, and Cal demands he undergo "The Walk", a 250-mile pilgrimage that tests faith and endurance. Cal warns Eddie that if he refuses, Cal will tell Sarah everything about his involvement with Alison, a notorious enemy of the community. At her new job, Meg panics when she sees a Meyerist meditation room in the office, pulls her family from the community, and forbids Ashley to see Hawk. Mary sexually manipulates med technician Betsy to get drugs from the infirmary, confronts Cal and tries to leave, but quickly returns when her father emerges from among the protesters. Silas unexpectedly arrives at Cal's house, declaring that the Movement is dead because "Steve couldn't accept his own mortality". Cal pleads that the next generation is waiting for him to lead them, but Silas calls Cal a fraud. Cal lashes out, and accidentally but fatally stabs Silas. At the vote, Sarah makes an emotional plea for the Hondurans which sways the Membership. Eddie prepares to leave on The Walk, which is supposed to be a solitary journey, but Hawk returns home in despair and asks to go with him.
8	8	"The Shore"	Roxann Dawson	Annie Weisman	May 11, 2016
Cal buries Silas' body in the woods, in the hole previously dug by Eddie. Sarah leaves many phone messages for Cal, confused as to why he has disappeared in the middle of a community crisis. A Meyerist who was guarding the gate tells Sarah a lie at Cal's behest. Cal returns and brings Sean back to the New York community to reunite with Mary. The standoff ends as the community is successfully declared a protected space, the Hondurans are allowed to stay and the Meyerists receive a sizeable spike in donations. Sarah is mostly responsible for this success and swells with pride at her achievement. Felicia shares her concerns about Cal's recklessness and asks Sarah to be ready to take a bigger leadership role, which is exactly what Sarah wants to hear. Sarah finds a Pachamama idol Silas had left for her, of which she'd earlier dreamed. The FBI's case is handed over to Homeland Security, which Gaines views as putting politics before justice. Eddie and Hawk grow closer as they begin The Walk; at his childhood haunt Coney Island, Eddie has a second vision of his brother on the beach. Nicole delivers a baby, seemingly dead from the cord wrapped around its neck, whom Sarah revives through resuscitation and prayer. The experience is moving enough that Sarah almost transgresses with Cal, but when she stops he throws suspicion on Eddie, leading her to find Eddie's burner phone with Alison's phone number on it.
9	9	"A Room of One's Own"	Michael Weaver	Julia Brownell	May 18, 2016
Cal asks the still-comatose Meyer to communicate any displeasure before Cal commits to the next phase of the Movement. He promises to try to channel Meyer's ideas for the writing of the final rungs. Sarah meets Alison and trades her late husband Jason's journal for the truth about Eddie, that they were not transgressing but actually Eddie was questioning his faith. Mary's promiscuity and drug use are exposed. Cal prompts Sean and Mary to recommit through marriage. Eddie and Hawk return, and Sarah confronts her husband about his three months of lying, feeling that he's rejecting everything in her soul. She tries to contact Silas but is only able to leave unanswered messages. Gaines angrily confronts his superior over his lack of attention to the Meyerist cult but is given two weeks' leave to clear his head. A co-worker shows Gaines a pathology report showing Jason Kemp's hands were suspiciously burned. Cal asks John Ridge, whose son Freddie is succeeding in art school, for help to expand Meyerism globally. Later, he makes a false announcement that Steve is returning to America. Hawk leaves to get a job to support Ashley despite Sarah's threats to cut him off. Both parents seek help, leaving Eddie estranged from his extended family. Cal bribes Ashley to break up with Hawk by offering a house for her family. Eddie finds out, and accuses, then hits Cal in front of the membership. Alison reads her husband's journal, realizes Jason was severely mentally ill, and contemplates suicide before surrendering herself at the community.
10	10	"The Miracle"	Michael Weaver	Jessica Goldberg	May 25, 2016
Knowing it will keep him from seeing his children, Eddie refuses to sign forms labelling himself a denier and moves to a motel. Sarah wants Eddie gone and dogmatically demands that Hawk leave school and commit himself to Meyerism formally, even though she knows it's making him miserable. Alison seeks to return to the Meyerists, whom she no longer blames for her husband's death. Previously apostates were never allowed to return, but Cal claims the final Rungs change the existing policy, permitting forgiveness for repentant deniers. Worried about Silas, Sarah calls Felicia, who says Cal was at the community the night Silas went there. At the hospital Eddie prays for Gaines's daughter Lucy, whose condition suddenly resolves before her scheduled surgery. Eddie asks the community's head counselor Richard for help, fearing a psychotic break, but Richard urges Eddie to find the meaning in his visions. Mary tells Cal that they're alike, trying to be good but irreparably broken and seeking darkness; they have sex. She goes forward with her plan to marry Sean anyway. Cal announces that Steve will not be rejoining them in bodily form as he is going to merge with the Light but he and Sarah will continue to lead them, which the community accepts calmly. Mary's father demands to be paid off for his daughter and casts suspicions on Cal. Sarah agrees to take the Movement to the next level with Cal and join him as a guardian of the light, even after she discovers that Cal wrote the last three rungs himself. Eddie returns to the retreat center in Peru where he finds an empty hospital bed and Meyer standing at the window.

=== Season 2 (2017) ===
No. overall	No. in season	Title	Directed by	Written by	Original release date
11	1	"Liminal Twilight"	Michael Weaver	Jessica Goldberg	January 25, 2017
Atop Huayna Picchu in Cuzco, Meyerists celebrate Steve's ascension. Eddie and Sarah remain separated, though he won't sign the denier form. He now works in construction and Sarah lets Hawk and Summer visit him in secret. The novices help residents of Clarksville suffering a polluted water crisis. Among them are Hawk and jaded college student Noa. Eddie meets former classmate Chloe, who had dated his brother Johnny, whom Eddie briefly sees again. A flashback reveals that when Eddie found Meyer awake, they climbed Huayna Picchu together and Meyer declared Eddie, not Cal, the new son of the movement. They were both hit by lightning and Meyer fell from the mountain. His burned body is discovered by locals. Meyerist counselor Richard investigates, joined by Kodiak, a "gifted" 10R elder whom Sarah summoned from his hermitage in Siberia when she discovered Cal's deceptions. To protect the faith they agree not to disclose Steve's true fate. Mary is five months pregnant, severely hinting to Cal that he may be the father. Cal purchases a building at $5 million, much more than the organization can afford, planning to have Meyerism declared a religion for tax exemptions. Sarah is deeply opposed. Later, she accidentally hits a fawn with her car. Cal finds her, confesses that he accidentally killed Silas and shows her his body, further shaking her faith. They rebury Silas with the fawn beside him. Det. Gaines and Russell's wife Nicole admit their attraction. Later, Gaines returns to his family, who feel neglected by his absence.
12	2	"Dead Moon"	Michael Weaver	Annie Weisman	January 25, 2017
Opens with Eddie saying prayer: "Source of light. I need your strength. Righteous and good. Shine through me. Make me a vessel. So that I may bring strength, hope and guidance to all of those in your embrace. If darkness falls, make me a light. When darkness falls, make me a light." Sarah experiences flashbacks and nightmares following the reveal of Silas's body. In an unburdening session with Richard, she learns that Eddie was seen in Peru, which she questions. Eddie refuses to respond to the allegations and goes on a date with Chloe, his old classmate, and they awkwardly have sex. Hawk bonds with his new friend Noa and further explores his own faith. The two leave a bottle of the polluted water on the doorstep of the deKaans, wealthy industrialists whose factory caused the pollution. Hawk hurls a rock through a window. Abe helps to halt the Meyerists' application for tax exempt status, forcing Cal to tap the Ridge family for a fundraiser party. Told to not directly solicit donations, he nonetheless asks the crowd for help. Sarah, embarrassed by Cal's actions, escapes to another room and begins to get physical with another guest, but stops after seeing paintings of animals being hunted and killed, causing another flashback. Cal confronts the sexually aggressive guest and punches him in the gut. Sean questions the way Cal shows him and Mary off, bringing tension into their marriage. Hawk and Noa take an initiatory walk through a forest without lights on the dark of the moon and Hawk has a mystical experience.
13	3	"The Father and the Son"	Michael Slovis	Julia Brownell	February 1, 2017
Hawk shares his spiritual experience with Eddie, who expresses doubt. Hawk says he needs to commit fully to the movement and can no longer see Eddie. In a depressive spiral, Eddie threatens to murder Cal if he tries to take Hawk away. He joins Chloe at a casino, but realizes he's being followed by a Meyerist enforcer who tells him to stay away from the city center and punches him in the face. Kodiak shares memories of Steve's kindness and friendship with Sarah's mother Gaby, with whom he once had an affair. Richard and Kodiak read the "final three Rungs" and realize it's not Steve's writing. It names Cal and Sarah as the new leaders, but Steve had said the Light would decide that. Hawk and Sarah apologize to Mrs. deKaan. She threatens to have Hawk arrested unless they drop the water campaign. The movement can't afford independent tests thanks to Cal's overspending. Jocelyn Gaines warns Abe to wrap the case up, takes the children and leaves. Cal pressures Lisa, the IRS officer and sometime Meyerist who handled for their tax-exemption forms. Farmer Marshall Small expresses doubts that the Meyerists can truly help with the water; Sarah promises the tests will be done, and drinks some of the water herself to prove her commitment. Mary tells Sean her baby may not be his and he silently leaves. Richard and Kodiak withdraw to the forest for a private ritual hoping to summon Steve's spirit; seemingly successful, they hear him say "there is no Light".
14	4	"The Red Wall"	Michael Slovis	John O'Connor	February 8, 2017
Eddie awakens in the hospital. His doctor tells him Meyerism is a cult, gives him anti-anxiety pills and refers him to an ex-cult support group. The novices take a lesson in using will power to cause change; they imagine a white wall as different colors and see it vividly enough to believe it's actually changed – all but Sean. Noa takes Hawk to a "private concert" by Andrew Bird. He makes a play for her, but she says he is too young. The $5M building had been a homeless shelter for decades; Cal wants to expand the homeless services but evicts all the current residents. They are furious. Sean comes to Eddie's house, distraught over Mary's affair. Eddie tells Sean that family and love are all that counts. As he speaks he realizes he still believes in the Light. Sean and Mary reconcile. Kodiak speaks gently to Cal, inviting him to unburden. The FBI put a wire on Lisa and send her to the community where Sarah threatens Lisa with the tape of her unburdening session; Lisa writes a note warning about the wiretap. Sarah silently gives Lisa her tape, which she later burns. Sarah gives Cal Lisa's warning. Cal reassures her that they have new wealthy donors, among them Noa's mother, a high-powered music mogul.
15	5	"Why We Source"	Norberto Barba	Jessica Goldberg	February 14, 2017
In Meyerism, "sourcing" is interrogation with the subject's hand resting on a piece of treated paper similar to litmus. Cal hopes to uncover the FBI agent. Gaines, the real agent, passes the test. Cal asks his help. Sourcing also involves sweeps for contraband, such as cigarettes. Sarah's brother Russell leads these "ES" teams. Sean subtly warns Cal he knows about the affair, asking for a new refrigerator. Mary tells Cal her baby might be his. Summer reveals to the family she and Hawk have been seeing Eddie, angering Nicole, Russell's wife. Gaby advises her husband Hank to keep this quiet as they have secrets of their own. Richard source-interrogates Cal; he passes, barely. Sarah and Marshall Small negotiate with the lab about water testing in Clarksville. Mrs. deKaan has Hawk arrested and charged with eco-terrorism. In juvenile hall, he hears lectures about systemic racism and income inequality from his Afro-American roommate Samuel. Eddie prays in the Meyerist fashion and is inspired to locate Mrs. Dekaan's estranged son and reunite them by phone. However, Sarah has to promise to stop the testing before Mrs. deKaan will drop the charges. Sarah and Eddie reunite secretly and Sarah discovers the lightning scars on his back. Furious, Hawk tells Eddie he would have stayed in jail so the water tests could proceed. Gaines has the clinic inspected and frames Shelby, the community's nurse-practitioner; she is forced to leave. Sarah tells Marshall, who sits with his favorite cow as she dies, about having to stop the tests. He plunges a knife into the cow's neck, splattering Sarah with black tar and shouting that it is poison.
16	6	"For Our Safety"	Norberto Barba	Justin Doble	February 22, 2017
Sarah undergoes a purification rite, but continues secretly visiting Eddie. She misses a meeting where Cal puts Abe Gaines in charge of security. Members must now wear ID badges. Elders react badly, especially Hank and Kodiak, who says "Repealing rights is always done in the name of safety." Prompted by Nicole, Cal commends Russell's obedience and devotion publicly, inviting him to train for 8R. Wanting as a Meyerist to do his part to relieve suffering, Hawk moves to the city center. Cal speaks flatteringly to him, inviting him to train for 2R. Kodiak believes Cal's role in Steve's death should be revealed, saying the proof is in Steve's journals. He implies he might murder Cal himself; Richard locks him in the archive room. Years ago, Cal, then a small child, overheard a private session where Steve and Kodiak confessed terrible things they'd done. Eddie attends social gatherings with Chloe, finding them difficult at first. He tries to tell Sarah about Peru; she refuses to believe Steve didn't ascend. Hank secretly visits his daughter Tessa. Richard counsels Sarah to let Eddie go, visualizing him walking away; she mentions the lightning scars and Richard bolts from the room to release Kodiak, saying Eddie, not Cal, was with Steve when he died. Gaines orders the FBI lab to test the Clarksville water, charging it to the Meyerist investigation; asked how to categorize it, he says "Offset", the Meyerist term for atonement.
17	7	"Providence"	Michael Weaver	Vanessa Rojas	March 1, 2017
Eddie babysits for Chloe's son Johnny, taking him to an exhibition at a local Army base. Kodiak follows them, but is unnerved by displays that revive his Vietnam War memories. The community is threatened with foreclosure. Sarah and Cal fail to raise the money. Each rung has a theme and 2R is "Service". Taking this deeply to heart, Hawk holds a Foot washing service for homeless people. Cal tells him to ask Noa for more money from her mother. Noa refuses, citing her mother's drug use and neglect. Hawk suggests her mother could be converted. Mary tells Cal she has faith in his ability to find a way. Sean slips away to call his mother, telling her about Mary's pregnancy but warning her not to come. In the forest, Gaines meets an associate who reports his request for a water test was denied. Richard secures and consecrates an isolated cabin where he can question Eddie. Sarah tells her family about the taxes; Gaines finds out from Nicole. Sean, walking on a back road, discovers his parents with a Deprogramming counselor in a car. Realizing he was followed, Eddie takes young Johnny and drives off to rejoin Chloe, but the surroundings begin to resemble a dream he'd had, including the cabin; he stops, discovers Richard in a parked van and is knocked unconscious by Kodiak. Cal joins Sarah's family at dinner, asking forgiveness and promising to find a way that won't risk their homes. Sarah begins listening to tapes of self-incriminating unburdening sessions.
18	8	"Return"	Michael Weaver	Annie Weisman	March 8, 2017
In Los Angeles, Cal connects with Noa's mother Jackie and tries unsuccessfully to help her persuade Luna, a very young pop star, to continue her career. Cal's mother Brenda is dying, leaving a message for Cal by way of Sarah; she apologizes for not having stopped Steve molesting Cal as a child. Sarah refuses to believe it. Hawk, now interim leader of the city center, discovers the financial crisis and confronts Sarah. Kodiak and Richard give Eddie ayahuasca to relive Steve's last moments. Instead, Eddie has a near-death experience. Steve leads him into the Garden (an expanded version of the Meyerist community). He sees his mother and his brother Johnny, who consoles him about Steve's death. When he revives he relates his vision and says he tried to keep Steve from falling, but he would have died of cancer anyway. Jackie tells Cal he doesn't believe his own sales pitch, and they have sex. Young Johnny is picked up by police and returned to Chloe. Sarah tells Cal of Brenda's death, saying only that she apologized for not being a good mother. Finding Luna considering suicide, Cal advises her to quit. He warns Jackie that Noa was courageous to disconnect from her: "Don't wait until it's too late to be a good mother." Sarah leaves a blackmail note for a former member. Richard gives Eddie Steve's medallion of the Meyerist Eye, affirming him as the next leader.
19	9	"Oz"	Patrick Norris	Coleman Herbert	March 15, 2017
Sarah's blackmail raises enough money to pay off the back taxes; she is literally sickened by what she's done. Eddie consults a priest at his childhood church about feeling "called". Cal, experiencing massive burnout, wants to quit. Deprogrammer Wendy Kennair gives Mary a copy of The Wizard of Oz, with its theme that people and things are not always what they seem. Eddie visits Richard; Felicia is there to take Eddie through the last three rungs. The theme of 8R is "mending". Eddie's visions lead him to condemn the shunning of outsiders and Deniers, which was not in the original doctrine and has destroyed many relationships, including Richard's with his lover Jeremiah. Cal asks Mary to run away with him; she refuses. Kodiak tells Gaby the community is about to collapse and pleads with her to escape with him. Eddie visits Tessa; she rejects his ideas. He then encounters Ashley, who later visits the city center to see Hawk. Gaines visits the "contributors" who tell him of the blackmail. In search of their tapes, he connects with Nicole again; they have sex. A chance remark of hers leads him to the archive room. Cal and Sarah give a brief and not very Meyerist talk on "self-love" at the World Faith Conference; later, they have sex. Hank visits Eddie, who explains he is preparing to take Cal's place and reunite the family. As they embrace, Eddie begins bleeding from his lightning scars.
20	10	"Restitution"	Patrick Norris	Jessica Goldberg	March 22, 2017
Restitution is a solemn three-day religious fast similar to Yom Kippur where Meyerists return to the community to reflect on, atone for and relinquish their worst sins of the year, sealing written confessions in tiny coffin-shaped boxes, which are flung into the lake and later retrieved and burned. Unnerved by a dream about Marshall Small, Sarah returns to the farm and finds that he has died. Gaines speaks with Don, one of the blackmailed members, who agrees to help expose Sarah's crimes. Hawk remains in the city with Ashley, but when she tells him of Cal's bribe he leaves. Wendy Kennair speaks with Sean about Meyerism vs. personal choice. He tells Mary she's the only reason he stays. Eddie persuades Tessa of his idea of shunned Deniers returning to the community; instead of waiting for a group she goes on her own, badly upsetting the family but also inspiring individual thoughts and reactions – including the revelation that Sarah had planned as a teen to leave Meyerism and go with Tessa. Eddie feels he has failed, saying he is no leader. As the people throw their boxes in the lake, Cal releases his mother's ashes. Instead of burning Sarah's box Richard opens it and shows her confession – that she was with Cal – to Eddie.
21	11	"Defiance"	Phil Abraham	Coleman Herbert	March 29, 2017
Felicia continues guiding Eddie through 8R. Hawk commits himself to Realignment Lockdown but feels worse, asks for Eddie, and later reunites with Noa. Eddie furiously confronts Cal and shows him Steve's Meyerist Eye emblem, proving he is the "chosen son". Sarah confirms Eddie was with Steve when he died. Cal rants hysterically at a security meeting, frightening the staff. Cal fakes a text message from Hawk to Eddie, dispatching three enforcers to beat Eddie. Eddie asks Hank to search the archive for Deniers and outcasts. Cal speaks to Hawk about his bribe of Ashley; Hawk later tells Eddie to accept Sarah and Cal's relationship, mimicking Cal's words and even his mannerisms. Hank and Gaby secretly reunite with Tessa. Cal goes through mementoes of Steve, stirring painful memories. Eddie confronts Sarah, but his words give Richard away. Mary warns Sarah that her baby's father may be an exploitive, abusive member but won't identify him. Sarah tries to tell Cal, then realizes Mary meant Cal. Cal encourages Sean and Mary to leave. At the last moment before getting in the car with Sean's mother, Mary runs away. The water tests are completed against orders and presented to Det. Gaines by a technician whose mother died young in Clarksville. Gaines finds he was set up to investigate the Meyerists only to prevent them from exposing DeKaan, his boss' highest campaign contributor. He visits Eddie and reveals his true identity. Sarah rifles Richard's home, finds a motel key and discovers Felicia. Cal's dreams reawaken more memories of Steve's sexual abuse.
22	12	"Spiritus Mundi"	Sian Heder	Coleman Herbert	April 5, 2017
Mary, lost in the forest, goes into labor. Felicia flatly refuses to cooperate and remains in Lockdown. Richard admits everything, is forced to sign denier forms and thrown out, homeless and destitute. His ex-lover Jeremiah refuses to help. Eddie interviews Deniers; many trace their banishment to Cal, not Steve. Gaines tells Eddie about the unburdening tapes used as blackmail. The "contributors" give their FBI depositions. Gaines slips a copy of the water report into Sarah's car (she doesn't see it). She meets Eddie who reveals he knows about the blackmail. As she drives back, someone runs her car off the road. She is hospitalized; Cal implies to Hawk that Eddie was responsible. Hawk angrily demands that Eddie must leave. Eddie gives his house to Richard, tells him about the blackmail and leaves. Richard warns that the ninth rung, "Augur", consists only of visions that will come to him. Mary's baby boy is white: Sarah assumes Cal's the father and repudiates him. Richard returns to the community. Denouncing Cal publicly, he declares Eddie the true leader, locks himself in the archive room and douses himself and the tape library with gasoline. At a filling station, Eddie senses Sarah is in danger and speeds back to the community just as Richard strikes a match.
23	13	"Mercy"	Jessica Goldberg	Jessica Goldberg	April 12, 2017
Sarah, with a warrant out for her arrest, is in Canada with Summer. Eddie visits them in secret. During a memorial for Richard, some devotees leave. With many Deniers they come to Eddie's house trusting his leadership. Eddie demurs, but is deeply moved by their faith. Mary pressures Cal to acknowledge his still-nameless son. Hawk shows the water report to Cal. Gaines locates Shelby, now homeless; Eddie takes her in. Cal warns Eddie that the "business" of religious leadership is difficult and talks him into helping to convince Mrs. DeKaan into arranging to dismiss Sarah's charges if the Meyerists drop the water scandal. Sarah and Summer flee when a neighbor becomes suspicious, but are passed through at the U.S. border. Later she remonstrates with Eddie for not letting her take responsibility. Mary tells Hawk that Cal is her baby's father; disillusioned with Cal over this and the DeKaan deal, Hawk reconciles with Eddie, saying he knows from personal experience that some aspects of Meyer mysticism are real. Cal names his son Forest Roberts. On Ascension Day, Cal rudely silences Felicia's story of the Ladder. He speaks instead about releasing pain and loss. A noise at the gate interrupts the festivities. It's Eddie's Denier group. Hank immediately opens the gate; the devotees greet the Deniers warmly, and Cal pretends he'd been in on the plan. Abe Gaines walks away, unnoticed. Felicia tells Sarah to be ready to lead as Cal is unfit and Eddie – for selling out Clarksville to save Sarah – has proven unworthy.

=== Season 3 (2018) ===
No. overall	No. in season	Title	Directed by	Written by	Original release date
24	1	"The Beginning"	Michael Weaver	Jessica Goldberg	January 17, 2018
Mark Fuller, one of the ex-members Sarah blackmailed, confesses to Sarah it was he who had run her car off the road, then kills himself in front of her. A freak earthquake causes a gasoline explosion and fire at the city center. Eddie gets everyone out and somehow shields a pregnant woman from a massive backdraft fireball; both emerge unhurt. A video of the "miracle" goes viral, attracting global attention and money. Six months later, the Meyerists own a massive modern complex. Eddie declares the original rural compound open to the public. The "miracle" interests Lilith, a veterinarian who is also the leader of a grim offshoot of the old faith; her daughter Vera Stephens becomes Eddie's publicist. In Florida, Cal and Mary hold Lifespring-like workshops. They live with former football star Harold, where Cal is on call 24-7 to help with his anxiety and drug abuse. Caleb Matthews, son of a famous Christian preacher, applies to hold "Musa" youth group meetings in the Meyer building's interfaith space. Dead, skinned rabbits are found hanging from a tree on the old property; devotees hold a funeral including a blood atonement ritual that Vera films, infuriating Eddie. Seeking penance, Sarah discovers Steve's notes on Hypoxian Cleanse, a ritual of confession, bondage, and asphyxia. While in Boston to help Harold with a family gathering, Cal meets Sarah and does this for her, while Sarah chants "Meyerism doesn't work for me any more." However, the experience causes him to experience flashbacks to childhood abuse.
25	2	"A Beast, No More"	Patrick Norris	Annie Weisman	January 17, 2018
Cal's abuse flashbacks and associated panic attacks intensify. Mary is suspicious, but he can't reveal that he recovered memories in Sarah's private, personal ceremony. At a dedication for Harold's health club, Cal finds himself quoting Hamlet's "I do not know why yet I live to say" speech. Vera remonstrates her mother Lilith about Lilith's neglected eye trouble. Later, Vera shows Sarah plans to market the "juice cleanse", a Meyer sacramental, for recruiting new members at the university. While on campus Sarah encounters comparative religion professor Jackson Neill, who asks her to address his students. Novice Monica Garcia's parents show up demanding she leave the "cult". Old Meyerist rules forced families apart, so Eddie asks Monica to rejoin her family, infuriating Hawk; after counseling Monica and understanding her sincerity, Eddie lets her stay. Monica's family distributes flyers and billboards attacking Meyerism; Vera blackmails them with the fact that Mr. Garcia is undocumented. Hawk attends the interfaith fellowship/beer party with the Christian Musa group, and his cousin Joy expresses romantic interest in Caleb. Sarah pleads with Cal to give her the Hypoxian Cleanse again, but he refuses. Lilith leads a session telling members Eddie will summon a "cleansing fire of destruction" and be killed, allowing the "truly chosen" to enter the Garden.
26	3	"Locusts"	Michael Weaver	Julia Brownell	January 17, 2018
Meyerism ingathers more seekers of peace and safety in a dangerous world. Eddie discovers Logan Dodd, a disturbed teen, hiding in the Meyer forest. He killed the rabbits for food. He has a swastika tattoo, which he says is meaningless to him, but was helpful in juvenile detention. Eddie welcomes Logan, saying he was like Logan at that age. Devotees, particularly non-white members, including Felicia, Nicole, and her daughter Joy, react badly to the "Nazi kid"; he fails the ODE personality inventory that assesses whether a damaged person can be healed. Cal quits his "servant" job with Harold, who goes berserk and attacks Mary. As they flee, Mary steals two of Harold's championship rings. Sarah addresses Neill's comparative religion class; he asks her to dinner. Vera and her mother Lilith visit a bomb shelter-like facility prepared by Lilith's Meyerist offshoot devotees, speaking about how "the end" will come after Meyerism is established at the "four corners" of the earth. They believe "Eddie must die so we can live". The novices and Musa group hold another beer party in the old community. An argument between Hawk and Logan escalates into a fight, and Logan is sent away. In his house on the Meyer property, Eddie discovers a box on the doorstep with a note reading, "White reflects most light". Opening the box, he finds thousands of locusts who swarm out into the night.
27	4	"De Rerum Natura"	Patrick Norris	Coleman Herbert	January 24, 2018
A false bomb threat sends community members fleeing to the city center; Eddie regrets his new policy of openness. He apologizes to the membership and reinstates some old rules. Cal arrives and ingratiates himself. Eddie relegates him to a dorm and insists that Forest be "Embraced", a dedication making Eddie his spiritual father. In an old home movie of the founding members, Sarah finds a few frames with Steve, bound as if for the Hypoxian Cleanse, kneeling in a cave and being directed by someone called Lil. Gaby says this is Lilith, an "erratic, angry" ex-patient of Steve's who made "crazy claims" about him. Cal shows Vera Steve's compromising letters and photos, blackmailing her into putting him back in a leadership role. Sarah assures Mary that Cal acts solely out of self-interest. The Musa group leaves the Meyer center; Joy is hurt, as she liked Caleb. Hawk goes to Caleb's church and calls him an asshole for leading her on, then ghosting her. Mary sells Harold's rings to a Russian fence. Eddie and Cal take ayahuasca together and embark on a complex shared trip, in which they see the devotees lying dead on the ground, while Sarah departs alone. Speaking about Steve, Vera asks Lilith, "Did you know my father was a pedophile?"
28	5	"Pageantry"	Stacie Passon	Vanessa Rojas	January 31, 2018
Eddie begins a national tour of presentations at Meyerist centers. When they are harassed by fundamentalist Christians, Cal makes a rousing address. Eddie warns him to keep to prepared statements. Later, he finds Cal advising novices and removes him from the program entirely. Gaby directs the children in The Awakening, a sacred drama about the birth of Meyerism. Children who hope to take lifelong vows must participate in this initiatory experience. Summer is to play Steve, but Sarah forbids it. She and Eddie argue about this by phone. Mary encounters her father and later confronts him at a cafe before storming out, leaving behind Forest's bag with her money. Lilith's eye trouble is melanoma; she must have the eye removed. An old man, Daniel, asks Eddie to counsel his daughter; the girl died years ago in another cult's mass suicide. Daniel drugs Eddie and buries him alive, but Cal has followed them and rescues Eddie. Sarah relents and allows Summer to be in the play. Realizing that one of the songs has directions to the cave she saw in the film of Steve, she finds it on the property, enters, and discovers a hoard of Steve's old journals. Eddie arrives for the end of the play, having driven all night. The children enact the Future, where devout Meyerists enter the Garden. The audience puts on flower and animal masks showing they, too are part of the Garden.
29	6	"Messiah"	Stacie Passon	Andrew Hinderaker	February 7, 2018
Prof. Neill identifies Steve's old journals as an early draft of The Ladder, Meyerism's sacred text, but points out there are two authors, not one. This throws Sarah into a crisis of faith. Neill comforts her, and they have sex. Hank Armstrong dies of a sudden heart attack. Sarah, still with Neill, doesn't get her family's text messages. Harold coerces Cal into helping him find his stolen rings. The Russian fence reveals the buyer after Harold wins a cocaine-snorting competition. Sarah participates in the rites for her father's death, although family tensions are revealed. Caleb listens to Hawk's stories of Hank, and they kiss. Harold and Cal confront Sameer, the fan who bought Cal's stolen rings. Sameer insults Harold, who bludgeons him and leaves. Vera blackmails Sameer with having received stolen property, so he won't identify Harold or Cal to police. Mary stole the rings for money believing Cal would desert her; Cal assures her of his love. Mary's dad spent her money on heroin. She injects him with a lethal overdose. Sarah tells Eddie about her work with Dr. Neill. Eddie warns Neill to stay away from her. At Hank's burial, Eddie declares that the Light chose him, and those who wish to enter the Garden must follow him. Later, Sarah takes the journals to Eddie and begs him to help her regain her faith.
30	7	"The Gardens at Giverny"	Peter Sollett	Jessica Goldberg	February 14, 2018
The first European Meyerist center opens at the immense French estate of convert Jean-Paul's. Cal and Mary expect Eddie to appoint Cal as Guardian after his rescue of Eddie. Sarah can find no information about Lilith, the second journal author. Eddie assures Sarah that her father is safe. He asks Vera to help find Lilith; Vera warns her mother. Hawk hears Caleb sing at a Christian night club and is questioned by an older man, Arnie. At the Lane home, Hawk and Caleb confide in one another and have sex. Summer and Gaby discover them and welcome Caleb. Sarah and Cal lead a healing workshop, observed by hypnotist/energy worker Marcel Stendhal. Eddie names Felicia as Guardian of the Meyerist center in France. Refusing "private audience" with Jean-Paul, Eddie reaffirms his love for Sarah at an outdoor cafe. Cal maneuvers Jean-Paul into an embarrassing stunt re-enactment of Steve's ascension, then later consoles Jean-Paul, promising to help him. Sarah asks Marcel to guide her through a lucid dream for clues on Lilith. She sees young Lilith telling Steve of her visions, then looking through his files, finding one on "John Kordjak", a name from the journals. Felicia tells Vera Lilith was cast out because she severely burned her child, a dangerous "old practice" which Steve abolished. Sarah leaves, saying she cannot condone the theatrics. Feeling much the same, Eddie fires Vera; she and Mary commiserate over champagne. When joined by Cal, the three dance together, and Cal sees a terrible burn scar on Vera's back.
31	8	"The Door"	Peter Sollett	Annie Weisman	February 21, 2018
Eddie says it's time for "Refinement", casting off distracting possessions or ideas. Sarah takes Prof. Neill to look for "Kordjak"; he is Kodiak, now helping disabled veterans in a hospice. He says Steve appropriated Lilith's ideas, then banished her without crediting her, denying her existence. All the elders knew. Vera asks her mother about the burn scar, which Lilith had told her was from a car wreck; Lilith admits burning Vera "for her own good", and Vera leaves. Vera tries to connect with ex-husband Remy, but he's moved on. JP sends Cal and Mary a Porsche, which they enjoy but fear will give away their plans. Driving it later, Mary spots Nicole watching. Hawk and Joy join Caleb at a gay nightclub where they're challenged again by Arnie. Caleb's father confronts Eddie about their sons' affair. Eddie has Cal take him through a ritual to find his own distraction and concludes it's Sarah, as he cannot make her believe. Later, he asks her to leave. As the devotees reveal what they're giving up, Cal drives the Porsche onto the property and leads the group in smashing it. Late that night, Sarah comes to Lilith's door, and Vera comes to Eddie's door asking to become a Meyerist.
32	9	"The Veil"	Michael Weaver	John O'Connor	February 28, 2018
Lilith tells Sarah of her early visions of the Light, which prompted her parents to take her to Steve's psychiatric clinic. She and Steve created Meyerism together. She gives Sarah the book of her own doctrine. Eddie arranges to bribe building inspectors to certify a day care at the city center, and speaks with Rufus Mott, a cook who's suing the Meyerists for a slip and fall injury suffered the day after he defected from 1R. Mott gets a restraining order against Eddie. Vera demands to take the ODE test, which is administered by Cal. When asked to recount a "moment of bliss", she recounts an afternoon of innocent play during her childhood, with a boy who it turns out was Cal. He is profoundly affected by the recovered memory. The test shows Vera is "blocked", but Eddie accepts her anyway, and they have sex. Gaby moves in with Sarah to support her in regaining her faith, and says Hank communicates with her from the afterlife. Cal and Mary coach Congressman Buck, who's been accused of sexual harassment; later, Cal assigns Mary to lead a session with Buck alone, which session reveals painful truths. Caleb tells Hawk he's being sent away for conversion therapy. Sarah asks Lilith about the Garden, but Lilith says she never saw that; Steve added it for a "happy ending". Using kambo, Lilith shows Sarah the end time she did see, a rain of blood, millions dead, and a blazing apocalypse.
33	10	"The Strongest Souls"	Michael Weaver	Lorna Clarke Osunsanmi	March 7, 2018
Post-surgery, Lilith dreams that Eddie is murdered in Jakarta. She shows Sarah the underground shelter where "those who know the truth" will live "after the fire". Sarah pleads with Eddie to speak with Lilith. A new lawyer, recommended by Vera, creates a draconian "liability agreement" for members. All react badly, especially Gaby, who says she should have listened to Sarah. Cal shows Vera the meadow and tree of her "blissful memory". Believing Eddie will disband Meyerism if he learns the truth, neither Cal nor Vera admits knowing Lilith. Cal begins non-Meyer psychotherapy for his emerging memories. At a Transmutation ceremony, a tree is planted over Hank's grave; Sarah says a brief prayer from Lilith's rituals and cuts her palm to bleed into the soil. Hawk invites Caleb to an LGBT-friendly church, but Caleb's dad intervenes; Hawk tells him, "Your son has a beautiful soul, and you will never see it! You're the one that's going to Hell, not him!" Hawk confides in Sarah, who apologizes for her treatment of him over Ashley. Vera reveals to Eddie all about Lilith, Steve, and her own role. She begs him not to see Lilith, but Eddie immediately goes to Lilith's office. She's not there, so he tells Vera, "Whenever she can – I will come to her."
34	11	"Bad Faith"	Jacob Hatley	Coleman Herbert	March 14, 2018
Meyerist convert Gede, a rich Balinese who owns a chain of hotels, wants to start a Meyerist center at Kuta Beach. Hawk and Eddie go to the gay conversion center to free Caleb, but fail. Sarah discovers Vera is Lilith's daughter, prompting an angry call to Eddie. Mary keeps an eye on Buck as he addresses a group of Democratic women and intercepts his attempt at an assignation with a waitress; Mary and Buck become friends. Sarah as an ex-member is banned from the old property; she sneaks in anyway and is put in lockdown, where she and Cal share their painful stories. Cal enters the old cave and uses a belt to self-administer a makeshift Hypoxian Cleanse, to exorcise Steve's influence; this affects Eddie in an empathic way, while he is driving home with Hawk. Vera tells Sarah that Lilith, now committed in an insane asylum, is dangerous and has predicted Eddie's murder. Sarah refuses to help Lilith, saying she belongs there. Eddie gently asks Cal, "Did something happen to you with Steve?" Cal asks Eddie to pray with him, saying he shouldn't still want to be a Meyerist, but he does.
35	12	"A New American Religion"	Jessica Goldberg	Julia Brownell	March 21, 2018
Jackson Neill goes on nationwide TV denouncing Meyerism as a cult. He cites as evidence the liability agreement all members must now sign, the old journals, and a member who told him all. The elders convene over this and a damaging New Yorker article by Neill. Cal prepares to debate Neill on a subsequent show. Buck asks Mary to be his executive assistant. Sarah and Vera take Eddie to meet Lilith in the hospital. Lilith downplays her real agenda; Eddie has her released. Hawk uses the ICSA Cult Behavior Checklist to reassure the novices. Hoping to stop Lilith's prophecy, Vera blackmails Gede into dropping the Kuta Beach project. Cal begs Mary not to take the job and proposes marriage, but when he won't give up the idea of debating Neill on TV, she takes Forest and leaves him. Eddie and Sarah research Meyerism's origins using all the old writings, angering Vera who returns to Lilith. Cal does very well on the show, using information passed to him by Sarah at the last minute. Eddie's fury with Steve overwhelms him. He now plans to reform Meyerism by revealing the truth to all, despite what it will cost Cal. Late that night, Cal buys a handgun.
36	13	"Blood Moon"	Phil Abraham	Jessica Goldberg	March 28, 2018
Vera announces the Kuta Beach project is off, to the consternation of Lilith's group; Lilith determines to kill Eddie herself. Cal plans suicide. He slips notes to Mary and Forest into Forest's diaper bag. Mary finds them later; she calls Sarah and rushes to the old property where Eddie will announce "Revelation". Eddie pleads with Vera to help him rebuild the movement. Gaby and Felicia react furiously to the truth about Steve, but Felicia later confesses that she knew. In the 1970s she and Steve, with Silas' help, guided each other through 7R, during which process Steve had confessed his pedophilia, and they tried to heal him. Sarah finds Cal at Silas' grave. Overwhelmed by terrible emotions, Cal relinquishes his suicide plan. As Eddie addresses the crowd, Lilith fires at him, misses, and hits Vera. As Hawk reassures the devotees once again, Caleb returns. Eddie demands his lawyer obtain status for Meyerism as an official religion with the IRS and proceeds with his reform plans, asking Sarah's help. Sarah brings Lilith a lock of Vera's hair. Steve's spirit tells Lilith Vera's death was his plan all along. The Meyerist goons, who in the past had beaten Eddie, confront Lilith's second-in-command. Vera, now considered Meyerism's first martyr, is buried on the property and memorialized in photo portraits. Eddie and Cal exile Felicia from the community, after which Cal revokes Eddie's "Embrace" of Forest, saying, "I'm Forest's father, and I'm his only father." In juxtaposed scenes which reveal the similarities amongst the contexts, Eddie leads Vera's funeral service; Buck, who has Mary's support in his campaign, makes a campaign rally speech; Caleb's father preaches a sermon declaring war against enemies of the faithful; and Lilith's remaining disciples vow to fulfill her prophecy. Workers laying cables system in the forest uncover Silas' remains.

== Production ==
Cast of The Path.

The Path was shot at Haven Studios NY, located in Mount Vernon, New York. The Meyerist compound was shot on location in Nyack, New York, re-dressed with influences from kibbutz living, collective farming, and production designer Russell Barnes's experiences being raised on an island with limited resources. The two-story Lane home was built on a soundstage. Almost all of the Peru scenes were shot in the area, including a New York state park used for a mountaintop scene with subtropical plants concealing uncleared snow. The City Center is "played" by the Church House of the Flatbush Reformed Dutch Church Complex. The New Brunswick scenes in "Mercy" were filmed in Greenport, Long Island. Jean-Paul's palatial home and estate in "The Gardens of Giverny" were "played" by the Oheka Castle on Long Island.

The Eye symbol, central to Meyerist branding and given dominance in many interiors, was based on tribal, Egyptian, and modern art, with a rising sun overlaid to show hopefulness for a new day. Series creator Jessica Goldberg describes the Eye's symbolism as a duality of enlightenment and paranoia, meaning on one hand "your eyes have been opened, and now you've seen the truth", and on the other, "you're always being watched". While preparing to shoot a scene in a Westchester County storefront dressed as a Meyerist recruitment office, passers-by would come in—curious about the Eye on posters, books, brochures, etc.—wondering what the movement was and how they could join.

== Accolades ==
Award	Date of ceremony	Category	Recipient(s)	Result	Ref(s)
Annie Awards	February 4, 2017	Best Animated Short Subject	The Path Title Sequence	Nominated	

== Reception ==
The first season of The Path has received positive reviews from critics. On the review aggregator, Metacritic, the first season scored 70 out of 100, based on 33 reviews. On Rotten Tomatoes, season 1 has an approval rating of 78% based on 50 reviews, with an average rating of 7.26/10. The website's critical consensus is, "With strong performances, deep writing, and skilled direction, The Path offers an absorbing observation of the human condition, even if a rushed pace occasionally blunts the impact."

The second season also received generally positive reviews from critics. On Metacritic, the season scored 64 out of 100, based on eight reviews. On Rotten Tomatoes, season 2 has an approval rating of 75% based on 12 reviews, with an average rating of 7.22/10. The website's critical consensus is, "The Path struggles with occasionally logy pacing in its second season, but an expanded canvas and heightened stakes – along with overall solid performances – make the end results worth watching."

Tim Goodman of The Hollywood Reporter reacted positively to the series, writing: "There's a lot to like about The Path, from the strong visual sense of place that director Mike Cahill established in the first two episodes to its theoretical take on faith, and of course the exquisite acting and deft writing." Hank Stuever of the Washington Post wrote: "The Path works best as an intense psychological study of an extended family whose members equate faith and loyalty with happiness." Alan Sepinwall of HitFix had a more critical reaction to the series. He called the show a "dry, claustrophobic show, with not enough of a narrative hook to pull the viewer through hour after hour of it."

== Controversy ==
Residents of Marysville, Washington called the show "insensitive" for "exploiting" the October 24, 2014 shooting at Marysville Pilchuck High School. Episode 2 referred to the shooting in order to develop Sean's backstory. However, the writers had given the shooting a racial motive by having the fictional shooter state that it was due to "the color of their skin", although the real murder-suicide of the Tulalip Native American student Jaylen Fryberg was personally motivated and did not involve African Americans. As of 8 July 2016, Hulu and the show's writers had not responded to this.

In April 2017, following the announcement that Hulu had picked up the show for a third season, actor Rockmond Dunbar was abruptly told that his contract would not be renewed. Speaking about it with The Hollywood Reporter, he called the decision "not a healthy way to do business".

== See also ==
- List of original programs distributed by Hulu
