= Cherry (novel) =

2018 novel by Nico Walker

- Author: Nico Walker
- Language: English
- Publisher: Alfred A. Knopf
- Publication date: August 14, 2018
- Publication place: United States
- Media type: Print, e-book
- Pages: 336
- ISBN: 0525520139

Cherry is a 2018 novel by American author Nico Walker. It concerns an unnamed narrator's time in college, as a soldier during the War in Iraq, and life as a drug addict and bank robber after returning from the war during the midst of the American opioid epidemic.

The novel is an example of autofiction, as Walker was a military veteran who struggled with drug addiction and robbed banks, but there are several differences between the author's real-life actions and the main character's fictional actions.

A film adaptation, directed by the Russo brothers and starring Tom Holland, was released in 2021.

== Synopsis ==
The unnamed narrator, a young man from Cleveland, drops out of college and enlists in the United States Army as a medic during the Iraq War. Suffering from PTSD, the narrator starts self-medicating with opiates while deployed and continues once back home. His opioid use quickly becomes a devastating addiction that hurts his attempts at furthering his education and his personal relationships. After reigniting his relationship with his ex girlfriend, who enables his opioid abuse, the narrator begins to run out of money and decides to start robbing banks to pay for his and his girlfriend's habit.

== Development ==
=== Writing ===
Walker had been in a federal prison in Ashland, Kentucky, for bank robbery since 2013, and wrote the book on a typewriter over the course of several years. He was released early from prison in October 2019.

=== Cover ===
Janet Hansen, a designer at Alfred Knopf, created the book cover, which features a skull originally by Swedish graphic designer Daniel Bjugård. Walker’s literary agent dismissed an earlier version with "[it looked] like it should be sold in Hot Topic".

== Reception ==
The book was published to "near-universal praise" according to Vulture.com. It debuted at number 14 on The New York Times bestseller list.

The book and the film adaptation have been criticized for presenting the bank robber sympathetically, while overlooking the innocent victims of the crime, such as the bank employees caught in the crime spree.

== Film adaptation ==
Because Walker only had limited phone access while in prison, the negotiations for a film adaptation were unusually long. Days after publication, filmmakers Joe and Anthony Russo, through their studio AGBO, bought the production rights for $1 million then signed on to direct and produce from a screenplay by Jessica Goldberg. In March 2019, it was confirmed that Tom Holland was cast in the lead role. Filming began in October 2019. Ciara Bravo, Bill Skarsgård, Jack Reynor, Jeff Wahlberg, Kyle Harvey, Forrest Goodluck and Michael Gandolfini were added in October. Filming wrapped on January 20, 2020. After early distribution talks with Netflix, the Russo brothers struck a deal with Apple TV+ in September 2020. Cherry was theatrically released February 26, 2021 and premiered on the streaming service on March 12, 2021.
