= Jessica Goldberg =

American dramatist

- Born: 1975 (age 50–51); Provincetown, Massachusetts
- Education: New York University; Juilliard School
- Spouse: Hamish Linklater (divorced)
- Children: 1
- Relatives: Matty Goldberg (brother)
- Writing career
- Notable works: Refuge; The Path; Away
- Notable awards: Susan Smith Blackburn Prize (1999); Gracie Award (2021)

Jessica Goldberg (born 1975) is an American playwright, screenwriter, and television writer. In 1999, she won the Susan Smith Blackburn Prize for her play, Refuge. Goldberg is the creator of the Hulu series The Path and served as the showrunner for the Netflix series Away.

== Early life and education ==
Goldberg is from Provincetown, Massachusetts. She was raised Jewish and grew up in Woodstock, New York. Goldberg is a graduate of the dramatic writing program at New York University, and of the Juilliard School.

== Career ==
She was a Tennessee Williams Fellow at the University of the South and a recipient of the Le Compte de Nouy stipend, the first annual Helen Merrill Award, and a 2000 Berrilla Kerr Foundation Award. She was also a resident at New River Dramatists, a member of the PEN American Center.

Her play What You Need was commissioned by the Atlantic Theater Company. Refuge premiered at Playwrights' Horizons and won the 1999 Susan Smith Blackburn Prize.

Goldberg's television and screen work includes "The Prince of Motor City" (2008) for ABC, starring Piper Perabo, Aidan Quinn, Andie MacDowell, Rutger Hauer, and Morris Chestnut. Goldberg created the television series The Path, which aired three seasons on Hulu before being cancelled in 2022. Goldberg served as the showrunner for the 2020 Netflix series Away. She received a Gracie Award in 2021 in the category, "Showrunner Fiction – Drama," for her work on Away.

== Personal life ==
Goldberg married actor and playwright Hamish Linklater in 2002, but later divorced. They have one child, Lucinda Rose.

== Works ==
=== Plays ===
- Babe (2022)
- Better (2014)
- Affair Play
- Katzman and the Mayor
- The Schaubuhne
- Body Politic
- Sex Parasite
- Good Thing. Dramatists Play Service, Inc. 2003. ISBN 978-0-8222-1869-2.
- The Hologram Theory. Dramatists Play Service, Inc. 2002. ISBN 978-0-8222-1821-0.
- Refuge. Dramatist's Play Service. 2000. ISBN 978-0-8222-1777-0.
- Stuck. Dramatists Play Service, Inc. 2000. ISBN 978-0-8222-1778-7. Premiered at Theatre Off-Park, New York City in 1999
- The Hunger Education
- What You Need
- Ward 57

=== Screenplays ===
- Cherry
- Absent Hearts
- The Amadou Ly Story for The Kennedy/Marshall Company
- Passing Strange for HBO
- Delerium for Mazur/Fox 2000
- Heart of a Soldier for Universal/Josh Schwartz

== Filmography ==
=== Television ===
Year	Title	Director	Writer	Producer	Notes	Ref.
2013	Deception	No	Yes	Co-producer	Wrote episode "Good Luck With Your Death"	
2013	Camp	No	Yes	Yes	Wrote episodes "CIT Overnight" and "Valentine's Day in July"	
2013-2014	Parenthood	No	Yes	Yes	Also supervising producer; Wrote episodes "Aaron Brownstein Must Be Stopped", "The Waiting Room", "Limbo", "Jump Ball", and "Let's Be Mad Together"	
2016-2018	The Path	Yes	Yes	Executive	Also creator; Directed episodes "A New American Religion" and "Mercy"; Wrote 11 episodes	
2020	Away	No	Yes	Executive	Wrote episode "Spektr" and "Negative Return"	

TV movies

Year	Title	Writer	Executive Producer
2008	The Prince of Motor City	Yes	No
2018	Suspicion	Yes	Yes

=== Feature film ===
Year	Title	Director	Writer	Ref.
2012	Refuge	Yes	Yes	
2014	Alex of Venice	No	Yes	
2021	Cherry	No	Yes	

Short film writer

- Affair Game (2006)
