= Mile 22 =

Film directed by Peter Berg

- Theatrical release poster
- Directed by: Peter Berg
- Screenplay by: Lea Carpenter
- Story by: Graham Roland; Lea Carpenter
- Produced by: Peter Berg; Mark Wahlberg; Stephen Levinson
- Starring: Mark Wahlberg; Iko Uwais; John Malkovich; Lauren Cohan; Ronda Rousey; Nikolai Nikolaeff
- Cinematography: Jacques Jouffret
- Edited by: Colby Parker Jr.; Melissa Lawson Cheung
- Music by: Jeff Russo
- Production companies: STXfilms; H. Brothers; The Hideaway Entertainment; Tang Media Productions; Closest to the Hole Productions; Leverage Entertainment; Film 44
- Distributed by: STX Entertainment
- Release date: August 17, 2018 (United States)
- Running time: 94 minutes
- Country: United States
- Languages: English; Indonesian; Russian
- Budget: $35–60 million
- Box office: $66.3 million

Mile 22 is a 2018 American espionage action thriller film directed by Peter Berg and written by Lea Carpenter, from a story by Carpenter and Graham Roland. The film stars Mark Wahlberg, Iko Uwais, John Malkovich, Lauren Cohan, and Ronda Rousey. It follows an elite top secret CIA unit composed of paramilitary officers from the Special Activities Division's Ground Branch, that has to escort a high-priority asset, a rogue police officer, 22 miles to an extraction point while being hunted by the government. The film marks the fourth collaboration between Berg and Wahlberg, following Lone Survivor, Deepwater Horizon, and Patriots Day.

The film was released in the United States on August 17, 2018, by STX Entertainment, and grossed $66 million worldwide. It received generally negative reviews.

== Plot ==
CIA Officer James Silva leads a top secret CIA Special Activities Division unit, code-named Overwatch, to infiltrate a Russian Federal Security Service (FSB) safe house in the United States. Under the supervision of James Bishop, Overwatch's mission is to locate and destroy shipments of caesium before the highly toxic substance can be weaponized to kill thousands. The unit kills the occupants, while Overwatch Agent Alice Kerr is wounded. One of the Russians, an 18-year-old named Anatole Kuragin, falls out of a window during an explosion after failing to save the caesium. Silva executes Kuragin despite his pleading, and everyone escapes.

Sixteen months later, Indocarr (a fictional country loosely based on Indonesia) police officer Li Noor surrenders at the United States Embassy to negotiate for passage out of the country in exchange for information on the remaining caesium. Kerr vouches for Noor's reliability as an asset, but he refuses to reveal the password to an encrypted, self-destroying disc until he is safely on a plane. While Noor is being tested, Kerr tries to come to terms with her family issues. Axel, leading a team from the Indocarr State Intelligence Agency, arrives at the embassy and demands that Noor be handed over as Noor fends off an assassination attempt by Indocarr government agents. Overwatch Agent Sam Snow and Kerr arrive, shocked at his combat prowess, learning that Noor used to be Indocarr Special Forces.

Silva agrees to take Noor to an airplane 22 miles away. Noor reveals he is turning on the corrupt Indocarr government because it killed his family. Bishop's surveillance feed blacks out, then comes on again. During the blackout, Axel's men place a bomb on the car, which explodes. While Silva's unit helps fend off Axel's men, Sam is mortally injured. Silva gives Sam two grenades and leaves her, letting her suicide-attack the remaining henchmen.

Silva, Noor, Kerr, and another Overwatch Agent, William Douglas, enter a restaurant. Silva sees Axel and walks toward him despite Bishop's orders. Axel tells James to give up Noor, but James refuses. While returning, he brushes past two girls and realizes that there is a grenade in the restaurant; he tackles civilians before it explodes. When the dust clears, Douglas is severely wounded, and Silva is attacked by the girls. Noor helps Silva kill them. While going to a safe house, Douglas dies while holding off Axel's men.

After taking cover in an apartment complex, Kerr is separated and meets a young girl. Kerr and the girl escape harm by using booby-trapped grenades. Silva and Noor split up, fighting Axel and his henchmen. Silva and Noor meet up again, as well as the young girl Kerr saved. She leads them to Kerr, who is losing against a henchman, until Noor kills him.

On the way to the air strip, the remaining team members briefly confront Axel. Exasperated, Silva has Overwatch destroy his car with a drone strike. The team barely makes it to the airplane. Li Noor boards the airplane, along with Kerr who is going to meet her family once again. While on the airplane, Bishop notices Noor's heart rate is accelerating, and it is revealed that Noor is not a double agent, but a triple agent working for the Russian government, and Kuragin was the only son of a high-ranking official within that government. The official hired Noor to give Alice the wrong information, so they would trust him. Just as Alice realizes this, Bishop's Overwatch surveillance team is raided. The entire team is shot and Bishop walks outside to die. Silva refuses to acknowledge that Alice is killed on the plane. Silva realizes this too late and details his experiences during a post-mission debriefing. Back at home, Silva puts up Noor's picture, vowing revenge.

== Cast ==
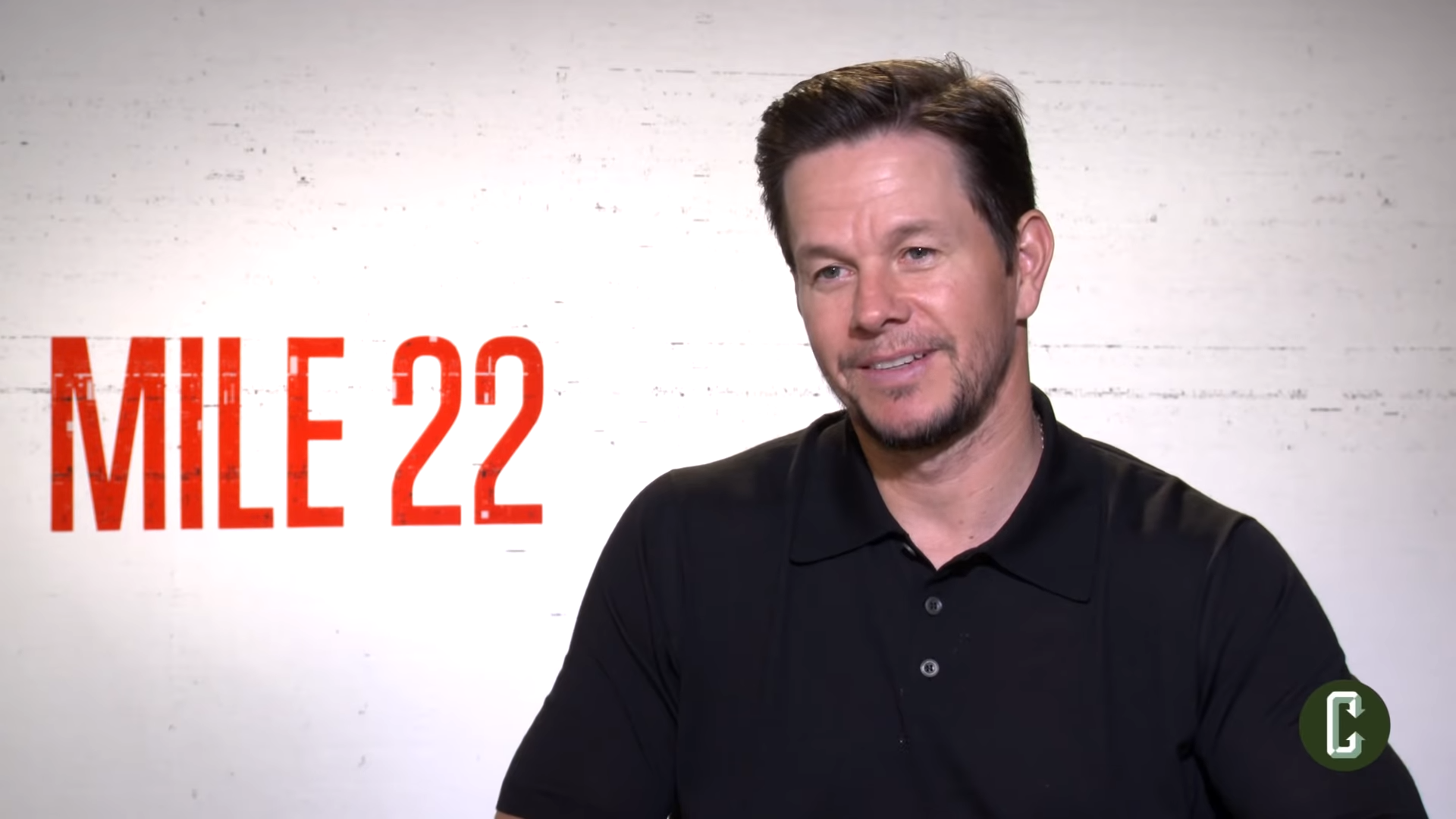
Mark Wahlberg plays James Silva in Mile 22

- Mark Wahlberg as CIA Officer James Silva / "Child 1", a former Force Recon Marine and field leader of Overwatch, a top secret CIA Special Activities Center unit
- Lauren Cohan as CIA Officer Alice Kerr / "Child 2", a member of Overwatch
- Iko Uwais as Li Noor, an ex-Indocarr Special Forces operator and a rogue Indocarr police officer who wants to escape the country
- John Malkovich as CIA Officer James Bishop / "Mother", the supervisor of Overwatch
- Ronda Rousey as CIA Officer Samantha "Sam" Snow / "Child 3", a member of Overwatch
- Nikolai Nikolaeff as Senior Lieutenant Aleksander Aslanov
- Carlo Alban as CIA Officer William "Dougie" Douglas III/ "Child 4", a member of Overwatch
- Terry Kinney as Johnny Porter, CIA Indocarr Station Chief
- Poorna Jagannathan as United States Ambassador Dorothy Brady
- Peter Berg as Lucas
- Cedric Gervais as CIA Officer Greg Vickers / "Child 5", a member of Overwatch
- Lateef Crowder as Liam, a thug

== Production ==
On March 2, 2015, it was announced that Ronda Rousey and Iko Uwais were set to star in the action-thriller film Mile 22 scripted by Graham Roland, with Peter Berg attached as producer. WME Global was in talks to finance the film. On July 2, 2015, Mark Wahlberg was cast in the film to play the male lead role, while Berg was also confirmed to direct the film for STX Entertainment. Berg produced the film along with Wahlberg and Stephen Levinson. On March 28, 2017, Wahlberg and Berg announced that they are moving ahead with Mile 22 as a trilogy of films. On November 7, 2017, Lauren Cohan was cast in the film.

Principal photography on the film was shot in Atlanta, Georgia, in November and December 2017 under the working title Ground Branch Triple. They also shot film in capital city Bogotá and its surroundings in Colombia in January and February 2018. Location shooting in Colombia overlapped with the 2018 Royal Rumble in Philadelphia, at which Rousey made her surprise debut at as a full-time professional wrestler for WWE; Rousey made the journey to the event under total secrecy whilst using the film's shooting to misdirect fans as to whether she would appear at the event.

On February 5, 2018, Colombian President Juan Manuel Santos showed up during filming at one of the locations in Colombia. Director Peter Berg allowed President Santos to try to shoot one of the action sequences of the film.

== Release ==
The final trailer was released online on July 26, 2018. The film was originally going to be released on August 3, 2018, but was pushed back two weeks to August 17, 2018.

Mile 22 was to be the first of a possible trilogy. While there is no news on a third film, the second is reportedly still in development, with delays due to the COVID-19 pandemic, along with the need for possible re-writes to the story as a result of critical reaction to the first film.

=== Home media ===
Universal Pictures Home Entertainment released Mile 22 on Digital on October 30, 2018, and was released on Blu-ray and DVD on November 13, 2018.

== Reception ==
=== Box office ===
Mile 22 grossed $37.6 million in the United States and Canada, and $28.7 million in other territories, for a total worldwide gross of $66.3 million.

In the United States and Canada, Mile 22 was released alongside Alpha, and was projected to gross around $17 million from 3,520 theaters in its opening weekend. It made $5.3 million on its first day, including $1 million from Thursday night previews at 2,600 theaters. It went on to debut to $13.6 million, finishing third at the box office. In its second weekend the film dropped to sixth place, making $6 million.

=== Critical response ===
On Rotten Tomatoes, the film has an approval rating of 23% based on 192 reviews and an average rating of 4.2/10. The website's critical consensus reads, "Mile 22 lets the bullets fly — and not much else — in a thrill-deficient action thriller whose title proves sadly fitting for a film that feels close to a marathon endurance test." On Metacritic, the film has a weighted average score of 38 out of 100, based on 36 critics, indicating "generally unfavorable reviews". Audiences polled by CinemaScore gave the film an average grade of "B−" on an A+ to F scale, while PostTrak reported filmgoers gave it a 63% positive score.

Owen Gleiberman of Variety wrote: "Berg, when he wants to be, is a surgical craftsman of chaos. Yet Mile 22 has little weight or resonance." Todd McCarthy of The Hollywood Reporter wrote: "Like an athlete who leaves it all on the field, the film leaves it all in the moment and on the screen, and there's really nothing to take away afterwards. There is nothing to think about, no nuances to contemplate, no connection with these characters who exist only in moments of hyper-tension and crisis, no greater truths to consider other than to prevail."

The performance of Uwais received some praise. Katie Walsh of the Los Angeles Times said, "As a performer and fight choreographer, Uwais delivers, with some extremely athletic and imaginative kills, mostly performed while handcuffed. It's also far and away Uwais's best acting performance in a film, and he almost makes Mile 22 worth it." Brian Lowry of CNN stated, "In fact, Uwais's action sequences—fast paced and electric—are easily the highlight of a movie otherwise characterized by an abundance of automatic-weapons fire and tedious dialogue during the fleeting gaps between those bursts."

David Fear of Rolling Stone gave the film 2 out of 5 stars, criticizing the editing of the fight scenes and stating, "Why go through the trouble of giving Iko Uwais several fight scenes and editing them so that you can barely see the star inflict highly choreographed damage?...Mile 22 can give you chase scenes and bullet-ridden shoot-outs and evil Russians and lengthy diatribes. It can give you something approximating action. What it can't give you is a watchable action movie. That's where it truly fails to go the distance."

== Future ==
In 2018, Peter Berg announced plans for a sequel. As of June 2023, no further updates on the potential sequel have been made, with the film's negative critical reception and lackluster box-office performance being cited as a possible reason.
