= Extraction (franchise) =

Action film series

- Official franchise logo
- Original work: Extraction (2020)
- Owner: Netflix
- Years: 2020-present
- Based on: Ciudad by Ande Parks, Joe Russo & Anthony Russo

Films and television
- Films: Extraction (2020); Extraction 2 (2023); Tygo (TBA); Extraction 3 (TBA)
- Television series: Mercenary: An Extraction Series (TBA)

Audio
- Soundtracks: Extraction (2020); Extraction 2 (2023)

The Extraction film series consists of American action-thriller installments. Starring Chris Hemsworth as a black ops mercenary, each release is developed by AGBO in collaboration with Netflix as exclusive releases through the latter's streaming service. Based on the graphic novel titled Ciudad by Ande Parks and the Russo brothers, the plot centers around the fictional former-military turned-black ops mercenaries portrayed by Chris Hemsworth, Don Lee, and Omar Sy and detail their dangerous global rescue missions.

== Films ==
Film	U.S. release date	Director	Screenwriter	Producers	Status
Extraction	April 24, 2020	Sam Hargrave	Joe Russo	Joe Russo, Anthony Russo, Chris Hemsworth, Eric Gitter, Mike Larocca and Peter Schwerin	Released
Extraction 2	June 16, 2023	Sam Hargrave	Joe Russo	Joe Russo, Anthony Russo, Sam Hargrave, Chris Hemsworth, Eric Gitter, Mike Larocca, Peter Schwerin, Patrick Newall and Angela Russo-Otstot	Released
Tygo	TBA	Lee Sang-yong	Cha Woo-jin	Joe Russo, Anthony Russo, Don Lee, Won-ki Choi, Chris S. Lee, Michael Disco, Albert J. Kim and Angela Russo-Otstot	Post-production
Extraction 3	TBA	Sam Hargrave	David Weil	Joe Russo, Anthony Russo, Sam Hargrave, Chris Hemsworth, Eric Gitter, Peter Schwerin, Patrick Newall, Angela Russo-Otstot, Michael Disco, Ari Costa and Benjamin Grayson	Filming

=== Extraction (2020) ===
In March 2012, it was announced that the Russo brothers were on board to direct the film Ciudad, with Dwayne Johnson attached to star. The film's screenplay was written by Joe Russo based on the graphic novel of the same name written by the Russo brothers and Ande Parks. Following years of development, it was announced in August 2018 that Sam Hargrave would direct the film with a working title of Dhaka, while Chris Hemsworth was cast as the lead replacing Johnson. In November, additional cast was announced including David Harbour. Principal photography began in Ahmedabad and Mumbai, India in November 2018 and moved to Ban Pong, Thailand before wrapping in March 2019. The film's working title changed from Dhaka to Out of the Fire, before the official title was revealed in February 2020.

Extraction released exclusively on Netflix on April 24, 2020.

=== Extraction 2 (2023) ===
In May 2020, it was reported Joe Russo had been hired to write a sequel to Extraction, with the intention of both Sam Hargrave and Chris Hemsworth returning. In December 2020, the Russo Brothers stated that beyond the sequel they hope to develop a series of films set within the world of Extraction to launch a cinematic universe. In January 2021, it was reported that the Russo brothers were also working on an origin story for Randeep Hooda's character Saju. Filming for Extraction 2 was slated to begin in Sydney, Australia in September 2021, but measures related to the COVID-19 pandemic moved production to Prague. Principal photography began on December 4, 2021, in Prague, Czech Republic, while further shooting began in Vienna, Austria on January 28, 2022. Filming officially wrapped on April 6, with additional reshoots taking place in Prague in November.

Extraction 2 was released exclusively on Netflix on June 16, 2023.

=== Tygo (TBA) ===
In December 2025, Netflix announced Tygo, a spin-off film in the Extraction franchise set in South Korea. The film will be written by Cha Woo-jin and directed by Lee Sang-yong and stars actors Don Lee, Lee Jin-wook and Lalisa Manobal. The story follows Lee as Tygo, a former child-soldier turned mercenary who goes on a revenge mission through Korea's criminal underworld.

=== Extraction 3 (TBA) ===
In June 2023 at that year's Netflix Tudum festival, it was announced that Extraction 3 was in development. Stating that the company identifies Extraction as a franchise, the official logo was revealed. Chris Hemsworth will reprise his role, with Sam Hargrave directing the film. By October 2025, Hargrave stated that Extraction 3 will begin filming in 2026, with an anticipated release in 2027. Extraction 2 cast members Golshifteh Farahani, Olga Kurylenko, and Idris Elba are expected to return for the sequel. In August of 2026, Don Lee was announced to reprise his role from other installments in the franchise, while Pierce Brosnan, Joe Taslim, Chi Lewis-Parry, and Siena Agudong joined the cast in supporting roles.

In April of 2026, Extraction 3 was officially greenlit by the associated studios. Hemsworth was confirmed to reprise his lead role in the franchise, with Elba and Farahani reprising their supporting characters. Sam Hargrave will once again serve as director, with a script written by David Weil; while Anthony Russo, Joe Russo, Angela Russo-Otstot, Michael Disco, Ari Costa, Hemsworth, Benjamin Grayson, Hargrave, Patrick Newall, Eric Gitter, and Peter Schwerin will produce. Principal photography is scheduled to commence later that summer.

=== Future ===
In June 2023, Hargrave announced that a scene included in Extraction 2 is intended to set up a spin-off film centered around Nik and Yaz Khan; portrayed by Golshifteh Farahani and Adam Bessa respectively.

== Television series ==
Series	Season(s)	Episodes	Originally released			Showrunner	Executive producers	Status
Series	Season(s)	Episodes	First released	Last released	Network	Showrunner	Executive producers	Status
Mercenary: An Extraction Series	1	8	TBA	TBA	Netflix	Glen Mazzara	Glen Mazzara, Joe Russo, Anthony Russo, Angela Russo-Otstot, Scott Nemes, Chris Castaldi, Sam Hargrave, Eric Gitter and Peter Schwerin	Post-production

=== Mercenary: An Extraction Series (TBA) ===
In February 2025, it was announced that Netflix had greenlit an eight-episode series titled Mercenary, and set in within the same continuity as the Extraction films. Glen Mazzara was hired to serve as writer, executive producer, creator, and showrunner; while Omar Sy was cast as the lead. The plot will center around a mercenary in Libya who must navigate warring factions and killers in the nation in order to save a group of hostages. In August 2025, it was announced that Boyd Holbrook, Natalie Dormer, Waleed Zuaiter, May Calamawy, and Ed Speleers had joined the cast. In October 2025, Sacha Dhawan, Ross McCall, Pip Torrens, Sam Woolf, Michael Zananiri, Riyad Sliman, Muhannad Ben Amor, Aaron Heffernan, Jojo Macari, Theo Ogundipe, and Emma Appleton were added to the cast. The Russo brothers, Angela Russo-Otstot, Scott Nemes, Chris Castaldi, Sam Hargrave, Eric Gitter, and Peter Schwerin are executive producing. By December 2025, the series was officially titled Mercenary: An Extraction Series.

== Main cast and characters ==
List indicator

This section includes characters who will appear or have appeared in in the franchise.

- An empty grey cell indicates the character was not in the film, or that the character's official presence has not yet been confirmed.

Characters	Films				Television series
Characters	Extraction	Extraction 2	Extraction 3	Tygo	Mercenary: An Extraction Series
Characters	2020	2023	2027	TBA	TBA
Principal cast
Tyler Rake	Chris Hemsworth	Chris Hemsworth	Chris Hemsworth		
Nik Khan	Golshifteh Farahani	Golshifteh Farahani	Golshifteh Farahani		
Yaz Khan	Adam Bessa	Adam Bessa	Adam Bessa		
Alcott		Idris Elba	Idris Elba		
Tygo			Don Lee	Don Lee	
Kalidou Diallo					Omar Sy
Supporting cast
Ovi Mahajan Jr.	Rudhraksh Jaiswal				
Saju Rav	Randeep Hooda				
Amir Asif	Priyanshu Painyuli				
Ovi Mahajan Sr.	Pankaj Tripathi				
Gaspar	David Harbour				
Mia		Olga Kurylenko	Olga Kurylenko		
Zurab Radiani		Tornike Gogrichiani			
Davit Radiani		Tornike Bziava			
Ketevan Radiani		Tinatin Dalakishvili			
Konstantine		Daniel Bernhardt			
Vakhtang		Levan Saginashvili			
TBA			Pierce Brosnan		
TBA			Joe Taslim		
TBA			Chi Lewis-Parry		
TBA			Siena Agudong		
Ria				Lalisa Manobal	
Arman Choi				Lee Jin-wook	
David Ibarra					Boyd Holbrook
Clayton Wisper					Natalie Dormer

== Additional production and crew details ==
Film	Crew/Detail					
Film	Composer(s)	Cinematographer	Editor(s)	Production company	Distributing companies	Running time
Extraction	Henry Jackman & Alex Belcher	Newton Thomas Sigel	Peter B. Ellis & Ruthie Aslan	AGBO Films, Netflix Original Films, T.G.I.M. Films, Thematic Entertainment, India Take One Productions	Netflix	1 hr 53 mins
Extraction 2	Henry Jackman & Alex Belcher	Greg Baldi	Álex Rodríguez & William Hoy	AGBO, Netflix Original Films, T.G.I.M. Films, Filmhaus Films, Wild State Productions, Stillking Films	Netflix	2 hrs 2 mins
Tygo	TBA	TBA	TBA	AGBO, Netflix Original Films, T.G.I.M. Films, Big Punch Pictures, Nova Film, B&C Content	Netflix	TBA
Mercenary: An Extraction Series	TBA	TBA	TBA	AGBO, Netflix Original Series	Netflix	TBA
Extraction 3	TBA	Fraser Taggart	TBA	AGBO, Netflix Original Films, T.G.I.M. Films	Netflix	TBA

== Reception ==
Film	Rotten Tomatoes	Metacritic
Extraction	67% (222 reviews)	56 (35 reviews)
Extraction 2	80% (133 reviews)	57 (29 reviews)

Extraction was viewed by 99 million households during its first month of release, breaking the record for the biggest premiere in Netflix's history. Extraction 2 earned 129.3M views in its first 66 days, entering Netflix's most popular films list at number ten, right below the original film at number nine. This made Extraction the first film franchise to chart two films on Netflix's most popular movies list.

== Music ==
=== Soundtracks ===
Title	U.S. release date	Length	Composer(s)	Label
Extraction (Soundtrack from the Netflix Film)	April 24, 2020	68:00	Henry Jackman and Alex Belcher	Netflix Music
Extraction 2 (Soundtrack from the Netflix Film)	June 16, 2023	61:00	Henry Jackman and Alex Belcher	Netflix Music
