= List of television series and films based on Oni Press publications =

Below is a list of television series and feature films based on characters and concepts that have appeared in Oni Press publications, including its various imprints. This list includes live action and animated television series and films.

== Television ==
=== Live-action ===
Title	Seasons	Episodes	Original airing	Production company	Network	Notes / Refs
Stumptown	1	18	2019–20	ABC Studios / The District	ABC	
In development
Mercenary: An Extraction Series	1	TBA	TBA	TBA	TBA	

=== Pilots ===
Title	Year	Production company	Network	Notes / Refs
The Sixth Gun	2013	NBC	—N/a	Passed over by NBC.

=== Animated ===
Title	Seasons	Episodes	Original airing	Production company	Network	Notes / Refs
Scott Pilgrim Takes Off	1	8	2023	Marc Platt Productions / Complete Fiction / Universal Content Productions / Science Saru	Netflix	

== Film ==
=== Live-action ===
Year	Title	Production studio(s)	Notes
2009	Whiteout	Warner Bros	
2010	Scott Pilgrim vs. the World	Universal Pictures	
2010	Scott Pilgrim vs. The Animation		Animated TV special
2017	Atomic Blonde	Focus Features	Based on the graphic novel The Coldest City.
2020	Extraction	Netflix	Based on the graphic novel Ciudad.
2023	Extraction 2	Netflix	Based on the graphic novel Ciudad.
2027	Extraction 3		
TBA	Tygo		Extraction spin-off
TBA	John Wick/Atomic Blonde crossover		

== Reception ==
=== Box office ===
Title	Distributor(s)	Release date (United States)	Budget (millions)	Box office gross			
Title	Distributor(s)	Release date (United States)	Budget (millions)	Opening weekend (North America)	North America	Other territories	Worldwide
Whiteout	Warner Bros	September 11, 2009	$35	$4,915,104	$10,275,638	$7,565,229	$17,840,867
Scott Pilgrim vs. the World	Universal Pictures	August 13, 2010	$60	$10,609,795	$31,524,275	$16,140,284	$47,664,559
Atomic Blonde	Focus Features	July 28, 2017	$30	$18,286,420	$51,687,870	$48,326,155	$100,014,025
Extraction	Netflix	April 24, 2020	$65	N/A	N/A	N/A	N/A
Total			$120	$39,171,853	$88,127,249	$72,031,668	$165,519,451

=== Critical and public reception ===
Film	Rotten Tomatoes	Metacritic	CinemaScore
Whiteout	7% (114 reviews)	28 (19 reviews)	C-
Scott Pilgrim vs. the World	81% (238 reviews)	69 (38 reviews)	A-
Atomic Blonde	78% (414 reviews)	63 (50 reviews)	B
Extraction	67% (205 reviews)	56 (35 reviews)	B
Extraction 2	80% (133 reviews)	57 (29 reviews)	B
List indicator: A dark grey cell indicates information is not available for the film.

== See also ==
- List of Oni Press publications
