= Mercenary: An Extraction Series =

American television series

- Genre: Action thriller
- Created by: Glen Mazzara
- Showrunner: Glen Mazzara
- Directed by: Louise Hooper; Tim Southam
- Starring: Omar Sy; Boyd Holbrook; Natalie Dormer; May Calamawy; Waleed Zuaiter
- Original language: English
- No. of series: 1

Production
- Executive producers: Glen Mazzara; Angela Russo-Otstot; Scott Nemes; Chris Castaldi; Sam Hargrave; Eric Gitter; Peter Schwerin; Louise Hooper; Tim Southam
- Producer: Ari Costa
- Production company: AGBO

Original release
- Network: Netflix

Mercenary: An Extraction Series is an upcoming Netflix television series created by Glen Mazzara, who serves as showrunner and writer. It stars Omar Sy and Boyd Holbrook and is produced by AGBO, and is set in the same cinematic universe as the Extraction franchise.

== Premise ==
A mercenary embarks on a dangerous mission to rescue hostages held in Libya, and finds himself trapped between warring factions and ruthless killers.

== Cast ==
- Omar Sy as Kalidou Diallo
- Boyd Holbrook as David Ibarra
- Natalie Dormer as Clayton Wisper
- May Calamawy as Priscilla Ragab
- Waleed Zuaiter as Hamza Najjar
- Ed Speleers as Alford Griff
- Ross McCall as Roger Ward
- Pip Torrens
- Emma Appleton
- Sacha Dhawan
- Aaron Heffernan
- Muhannad Ben Amor
- Jojo Macari
- Sam Woolf
- Theo Ogundipe
- Michael Zananiri
- Riyad Sliman

== Production ==
=== Development ===
The series is set in the same universe as Extraction (2020) from the Russo brothers, based on the graphic novel Ciudad by Ande Parks, and the wider Extraction franchise. The series was given an eight-episode series order by Netflix in August 2025. Glen Mazzara is writer, showrunner and executive producer on the series which is produced by Joe and Anthony Russo's company AGBO. Other executive producers include Angela Russo-Otstot, Scott Nemes, and Chris Castaldi for AGBO, Sam Hargrave, Eric Gitter, and Peter Schwerin. Ari Costa is series producer, and Jessica Granger is also a writer. Louise Hooper and Tim Southam serve as directors and executive producers of four episodes each.

=== Casting ===
The cast is led by Omar Sy and Boyd Holbrook with Natalie Dormer. In August 2025, it was revealed that May Calamawy, Waleed Zuaiter and Ed Speleers joined the cast. Cast members including Sacha Dhawan, Ross McCall, Pip Torrens, Jojo Macari and Emma Appleton joined the series in October 2025.

=== Filming ===
Filming began in September 2025. It wrapped in Ireland in December 2025 and then headed to Morocco, with principal photography wrapped in March 2026.
