= Scott Nemes =

American actor and producer

- Education: University of Southern California
- Occupations: Film & TV producer

Scott Nemes is an American film and television producer and former child actor. He is president of television at AGBO, and was formerly an executive with Universal Studio Group, Cinemax, and The Film Department.

== Early life and education ==
Nemes grew up in Los Angeles, attending Montclair Preparatory School. He attended film school at the University of Southern California, graduating in 1995. At 19, while at USC, Nemes and Sean Entin opened SpiralWest, a weekly dance club geared towards teenagers, held at the restaurant Club Hola in Encino, California, and later at the Country Club in Reseda.

== Career ==
=== Acting ===
As a child actor, Nemes was a regular on It's Garry Shandling's Show, playing Grant Schumaker from 1986 to 1990. He had a recurring role on The Wonder Years as Kevin's classmate and friend Ricky Halsenbach in seasons 5 and 6, from 1991 to 1993. He also had roles in films including Tough Guys and St. Elmo's Fire.

=== Producing ===
Early in his career, Nemes worked as a development executive for directors James Mangold and Penny Marshall. While running the film division at Adelstein-Parouse Productions, Nemes was an executive producer on the 2006 slasher film Black Christmas. He also helped to develop Mangold's Johnny Cash biopic Walk the Line, and the 2005 films Cinderella Man, directed by Ron Howard and starring Russell Crowe, and Bewitched, directed by Nora Ephron and starring Nicole Kidman and Will Ferrell. At Immortal Entertainment, Nemes co-produced the film My Baby's Daddy and developed Kiss of the Dragon, Life Without Dick, and Searching for Debra Winger.

In 2008, Nemes was named vice president of production and development at The Film Department. In 2011, he took on a new role as SVP of Cinemax. Also that year, he produced the 2011 film Hanna, directed by Joe Wright and starring Saoirse Ronan and Eric Bana, and was an executive producer on the 2019 Amazon Prime Video series based on the film. In 2017, Nemes was named head of television of Brad Weston's independent studio Makeready. In 2018, he produced the film The Catcher Was a Spy, starring Paul Rudd.

Nemes joined Universal Content Productions in 2019 as executive vice president of development and current programming. In 2021, he was named executive vice president of creative acquisitions and international development for Universal Studio Group, overseeing shows including The Girl from Plainville and Gaslit.

On May 3, 2022, it was reported that Nemes had been named president of television at the Russo brothers' independent studio AGBO. He is an executive producer on the Amazon Prime Video series Citadel, Citadel: Diana and Citadel: Honey Bunny, on the upcoming Netflix series Prism, starring Millie Bobby Brown, and on Netflix's Mercenary: An Extraction Series, starring Omar Sy.

== Awards ==
Year	Award	Category	Work	Result
1986	Young Artist Award	Best Young Actor in a Cable Series or Special	It's Garry Shandling's Show	Won
1987	Young Artist Award	Best Young Actor in a Cable Series or Special	It's Garry Shandling's Show	Won
1988	Young Artist Award	Best Young Actor Guest-Starring in a Syndicated Family Comedy, Drama, or Special	Out of This World	Nominated
1988	Young Artist Award	Best Young Actor in a Cable Family Series	It's Garry Shandling's Show	Nominated
1988	Young Artist Award	Outstanding Young Stand-Up Comic	Self	Won
1989	Young Artist Award	Best Young Actor in an Off-Prime Time Family Series	It's Garry Shandling's Show	Won

== Filmography ==
=== Acting ===
Year	Title	Role	Notes
1983	Twilight Zone: The Movie	Young Mr. Weinstein	Film
1983	The A-Team	Robert	1 episode
1983	D.C. Cab	Ambassador's Son	Film
1983	The Invisible Woman	Rodney Sherman	TV movie
1984	Meatballs Part II	Butterball	Film
1985	The New Leave It to Beaver	Hubert	2 episodes
1985	Punky Brewster	Willie	1 episode
1985	St. Elmo's Fire	Nephew	Film
1985	Konrad	Frank	TV movie
1985	This Wife for Hire	Greg Harper	TV movie
1985	Riptide	Peter Flynn	1 episode
1986	Mr. Belvedere	Boy #1	1 episode
1986	Last Resort	Bobby Lollar	Film
1986	Tough Guys	Yogurt Boy	Film
1986	The Magical World of Disney	Wendell	2 episodes
1986-90	It's Garry Shandling's Show	Grant Schumaker	71 episodes
1987	Out of This World	Alex	2 episodes
1987	Top Kids	Andy	TV movie
1988	Straight Up	Robbie	1 episode
1989	The Super Mario Bros. Super Show!	Young MacDonald	1 episode
1991-93	The Wonder Years	Ricky Halsenbach	13 episodes

=== Producing ===
Year	Title	Role	Notes
2003	Sol Goode	Associate producer	
2004	My Baby's Daddy	Co-producer	
2006	Black Christmas	Executive producer	
2010	The Experiment	Producer	
2011	Hanna	Producer	
2018	The Catcher Was a Spy	Producer	
2018	Class of Lies	Executive producer	TV series
2019-20	Hanna	Executive producer	TV series
2023–present	Citadel	Executive producer	TV series, seasons 1 and 2
2024	Citadel: Diana	Executive producer	TV series
2024	Citadel: Honey Bunny	Executive producer	TV series
TBD	Mercenary: An Extraction Series	Executive producer	TV series
TBD	Prism	Executive producer	TV series
