= AGBO =

American film and television production company

- Logo used since 2019
- Type: Private
- Industry: Motion pictures Television
- Founded: July 8, 2017; 9 years ago
- Founders: Anthony Russo Joe Russo; Mike Larocca; Todd Makurath
- Headquarters: Los Angeles, California, United States
- Key people: Anthony & Joe Russo (Co-Founders and Executive Chairmen); Donald Mustard (Partner); Chris Brearton (Partner); Angela Russo-Otstot (Chief Creative Officer); Lesley Freeman (Chief Legal Officer); Dominic Hughes (Chief Scientific Officer); Christopher Markus (Co-President of Story); Stephen McFeely (Co-President of Story); Matt Davidson (Chief Financial Officer); Jake Aust (Chief Innovation Officer); Marian Koltai-Levine (Chief Marketing Officer); Michael Disco (President of Film); Scott Nemes (President of TV)
- Number of employees: 64+
- Website: AGBO

AGBO (also known as AGBO Films and Gozie AGBO) is an American independent entertainment company specializing in film and television production, and based in Downtown Los Angeles. The company is led by Anthony and Joe Russo (known collectively as the Russo brothers), who founded it in 2017 along with Mike Larocca and Todd Makurath.

AGBO's film productions include 21 Bridges, starring Chadwick Boseman; Extraction, written by Joe Russo and starring Chris Hemsworth, and its sequel, Extraction 2; The Gray Man, directed and produced by the Russo Brothers and starring Ryan Gosling; Everything Everywhere All at Once, written and directed by Daniels and winner of seven Academy Awards including Best Picture; the 2025 film The Electric State, and 2026 film The Whisper Man, starring Robert De Niro. Upcoming film productions include the MCU films Avengers: Doomsday and Avengers: Secret Wars, a live-action remake of Hercules, to be directed by Guy Ritchie, and the Free Willy reboot.

AGBO's television productions include Citadel, a television series with Amazon Prime Video starring Richard Madden and Priyanka Chopra Jonas.

== History ==
=== Business developments ===
In March 2015, the Russo brothers announced they were launching a production company, then known as Getaway Productions, and tapped Mike Larocca as President. AGBO was officially founded on July 8, 2017 by the Russo brothers, along with Larocca and Todd Makurath.

In March 2018, it was announced that screenwriters Christopher Markus and Stephen McFeely, who wrote the screenplays for Captain America: The Winter Soldier and Captain America: Civil War, were named Co-Presidents of Story at AGBO. The name "AGBO" was a surname selected randomly by Anthony and Joe Russo from an Ohio phone book years prior.

On January 5, 2022, it was announced that the Russo brothers sold a 38% minority stake in AGBO to Tokyo-based game maker Nexon for $400 million. AGBO was consequently valued at $1.1 billion.

=== Production developments ===
==== 2016–2017: The founding years ====
In July 2016, it was announced that the Russo brothers would co-produce Deadly Class alongside creator Rick Remender. The series starred Lana Condor and Benedict Wong and aired on Syfy from December 20, 2018 through March 20, 2019.

In June 2016, it was announced that the Russo brothers would produce action film 21 Bridges for STX Entertainment. In July 2018 it was announced that Chadwick Boseman would star in the AGBO-produced movie, which was released on November 22, 2019.

In August 2017, it was announced that AGBO acquired the rights to the book Exit West by Mohsin Hamid, with Morten Tyldum set to direct. On December 31, 2017, Barack Obama included Exit West on his list of the best books he read in 2017, and then Obama's production company, Higher Ground Productions, announced they would team up with AGBO to produce a feature adaptation for Netflix, with Riz Ahmed attached to star, and Yann Demange directing. In August 2022, author Hamid stated that the film is still in the development stage.

In December 2017, it was announced that AGBO won the rights to the graphic novel The Electric State by Simon Stålenhag, and in March 2018 it was announced that screenwriting duo Christopher Markus and Stephen McFeely would adapt the screenplay. In December 2020, casting news broke that Millie Bobby Brown would star in the upcoming sci-fi film. In November 2022, it was announced that Giancarlo Esposito, Ke Huy Quan, and Anthony Mackie were joining the cast of The Electric State. The film, starring Brown and Chris Pratt, was released on Netflix on March 14, 2025.

==== 2018–2022: Launching the studio ====
In January 2018, it was announced that AGBO and Neon acquired the worldwide rights to Assassination Nation, written and directed by Sam Levinson, at that year's Sundance Film Festival in a $10 million deal. The film was released on September 21, 2018 in association with Refinery29. In June 2018, AGBO optioned the film adaptation of Alex North's novel The Whisper Man, with AGBO producing.

In August 2018, AGBO optioned Nico Walker's novel Cherry in a bidding war and announced this would be the next film the Russo brothers would direct after Avengers: Endgame. Tom Holland and Ciara Bravo star in the film. Apple bought the rights to Cherry in September 2020. The film had its theatrical release on February 26, 2021, and was released on Apple TV+ on March 12, 2021.

On August 30, 2018, it was announced that Anthony and Joe Russo were set to produce the Daniels' (Daniel Kwan and Daniel Scheinert) sci-fi action film Everything Everywhere All at Once, with A24 as the distributor. Released in 2022, the film would go on to be nominated for eleven Academy Awards, winning seven, including Best Picture.

On August 30, 2018, it was announced that Sam Hargrave would direct Dhaka, later renamed Extraction, from a screenplay by Joe Russo with Chris Hemsworth set to star in the film. The film was released on Netflix on April 24, 2020, and received the biggest premiere viewership in the site's history, leading to a sequel being put in development from the same team.

In October 2018, it was announced that AGBO would come on as a producer for the Emily Mortimer-starring indie horror film Relic, the feature directorial debut for Natalie Erika James. It debuted to critical acclaim at the Sundance Film Festival in January 2020. On March 10, 2020, the film was acquired by IFC Midnight with a release date set for July 10, 2020.

In October 2018, it was announced that AGBO would partner with Conde Nast Entertainment to produce the thriller Mosul with World War Z screenwriter Matthew Michael Carnahan set to direct. The film played at the 76th Venice International Film Festival and 2019 Toronto International Film Festival. It was later acquired by Netflix and released in November 2020.

On March 20, 2019, AGBO acquired JJ Braider's script All Fun And Games. On January 13, 2022, casting announcements were made for the forthcoming horror-thriller film, with AGBO producing, Asa Butterfield and Natalia Dyer to star, and Ari Costa and Eren Celeboglu to co-direct.

In April 2020, it was announced that the Russo brothers would team with Walt Disney Pictures to produce a live-action remake of the 1997 animated film Hercules. On June 17, 2022, it was announced that Guy Ritchie would direct the remake.

In April 2021, it was announced that Epix gave a 10-episode straight-to-series order to From, a contemporary sci-fi horror series, created by John Griffin and produced by AGBO and the Russo brothers. It was renewed for a second season in April 2022.

In July 2021, AGBO announced it was teaming up with Netflix for a heist thriller film starring Regé-Jean Page and written by Noah Hawley.

In August 2021, Hulu announced the expansion of its true-crime collection, including the docuseries Captive Audience: A Real American Horror Story, which is executive produced by AGBO's Anthony Russo, Joe Russo and Mike Larocca. In July 2022, it was announced that the docuseries became Hulu's most-viewed nonfiction TV program in its first month of release.

==== 2022–present: AGBOverse ====
In February 2022, it was announced that AGBO and Disney Television Animation would produce an animated film adaptation of Superfudge, one of Judy Blume's best selling books.

The Gray Man sequel and spinoff with Netflix was announced in July 2022, with Ryan Gosling reprising his role as The Gray Man, with AGBO producing and the Russo brothers directing. Paul Wernick and Rhett Reese, writers of Deadpool, will write the spinoff series.

On September 15, 2022, it was announced that AGBO would executive produce a Butch and Sundance series at Amazon Studios, starring Regé-Jean Page and Glen Powell.

The Citadel global multi-series announced the casting of Matilda De Angelis as the lead for the Italian installment of the spy thriller franchise, which AGBO is producing in conjunction with Amazon Studios.

In November 2022, it was announced the Russo brothers would executive produce and direct an eight-episode limited series about the FTX scandal in conjunction with Amazon Studios.

In November 2022, Variety named the Russo brothers "Showmen of the Year" and the cover featured the Russos with Chris Pratt, Priyanka Chopra, and Zoe Saldaña all as part of upcoming AGBO projects.

In February 2025, the TV series Mercenary: An Extraction Series was announced, a spinoff of the Extraction film franchise. The Netflix series stars Omar Sy as a mercenary on a mission to Libya to rescue hostages. It was filmed in Ireland and Morocco beginning in December 2025. The film Extraction 3, again starring Chris Hemsworth, is set to begin production in 2026. In December 2025, Tygo was announced, a spin-off film in the Extraction universe set in South Korea. It will be directed by Lee Sang-yong and will star Don Lee, Lee Jin-wook and Lalisa Manobal.

==== Community developments ====
Established in 2017 through AGBO, the National Italian American Film Forum Grant program annually awards multiple $8,000 grants to ambitious filmmakers around the country to create documentary, fiction or nonfiction narrative films that explore the Italian American experience for the benefit of future generations.

In October 2017, it was announced that the Russo brothers would offer an annual fellowship with Slamdance Film Festival which would consist of a $25,000 prize, filmmaking support and an office at AGBO.

In June 2019, it was announced that AGBO partnered with the American Film Institute (AFI) for an inaugural development grant which would award the recipient $25,000 to develop a project as well as year-long mentorship from AGBO.

In May 2020, the Russo brothers announced their new video podcast, Pizza Film School. The podcast aims to educate and spread some love to favorite classic films, as well as local pizzerias while movie lovers are stuck at home during the pandemic. Guests included Josh Brolin, Taika Waititi, Mark Hamill, Bob Gale and more. The second season premiered in April 2023 with the Russos talking to other directors including a viral episode with Zack Snyder, which was a crossover between the Marvel and DC universes. Other guests included Emerald Fennell, Nia DaCosta, Justin Lin, Justin Chon, R.J. Cutler, and more.

In April 2021, AGBO began running its annual "No Sleep 'til Film Fest" competition, an opportunity for emerging creators to submit a short film for consideration from AGBO's Executive teams. The virtual short film festival invites filmmakers from all countries to make a short movie in only 48 hours. The first year of the festival received over 700 submissions from filmmakers in over 60 countries.

In 2022, Joe Russo helped to found and fund, through AGBO, the inaugural annual International Film Festival of St Andrews in partnership with the University of St Andrews in Scotland. The festival showcases international cinema and hosts workshops for filmmakers. AGBO remains the lead sponsor of the festival.

== Filmography ==
=== Feature films ===
Year	Title	Director	Notes
2018	Assassination Nation	Sam Levinson	Under Gozie AGBO; co-production with Bron Studios, Foxtail Entertainment and Phantom Four; co-distributed with Neon, 30West and Refinery29
2019	21 Bridges	Brian Kirk	co-production with MWM Studios, H. Brothers and X-Ception Content; distributed by STXfilms
2019	Mosul	Matthew Michael Carnahan	co-production with Image Nation Abu Dhabi and Condé Nast Entertainment; distributed by Netflix
2020	Relic	Natalie Erika James	Under Gozie AGBO; co-production with Screen Australia, Film Victoria, Nine Stories Productions and Carver Films; distributed by IFC Midnight and Stan
2020	Extraction	Sam Hargrave	co-production with Thematic Entertainment, India Take One Productions and T.G.I.M. Films; distributed by Netflix
2021	Cherry	Anthony and Joe Russo	co-production with The Hideaway Entertainment and Endeavor Content; distributed by Apple TV+
2022	Everything Everywhere All at Once	Dan Kwan and Daniel Scheinert	Under Gozie AGBO; co-production with Ley Line Entertainment and IAC Films; distributed by A24
2022	The Gray Man	Anthony and Joe Russo	co-production with Roth/Kirschenbaum Films; distributed by Netflix
2023	Extraction 2	Sam Hargrave	Distributed by Netflix
2023	All Fun and Games	Ari Costa and Eren Celeboglu	Under Gozie AGBO; co-production with Anton; distributed by Vertical Entertainment
2025	The Legend of Ochi	Isaiah Saxon	co-production with Encyclopedia Pictura, Neighborhood Watch and Year of the Rat; distributed by A24
2025	The Electric State	Anthony and Joe Russo	co-production with Double Dream and Skybound; distributed by Netflix
2026	The Bluff	Frank E. Flowers	co-production with Cinestar Pictures, Big Indie Pictures and Purple Pebble Pictures; distributed by Amazon MGM Studios
2026	The Whisper Man	James Ashcroft	Distributed by Netflix
2026	Avengers: Doomsday	Anthony and Joe Russo	co-production with Marvel Studios; distributed by Walt Disney Studios Motion Pictures
2027	John Rambo	Jalmari Helander	co-production with Millennium Media and Templeton Media; distributed by Lionsgate
2027	Avengers: Secret Wars	Anthony and Joe Russo	co-production with Marvel Studios; distributed by Walt Disney Studios Motion Pictures
TBA
TBA	Extraction 3	Sam Hargrave	co-production with Wild State and T.G.I.M. Films; distributed by Netflix
TBA	Tygo	Lee Sang-yong	co-production with Big Punch Pictures and TGIM

=== Television series ===
Year(s)	Title	Creator(s)	Co-production(s)
2019	Deadly Class	Rick Remender; Miles Orion Feldsott	Syfy; Universal Cable Productions; Sony Pictures Television
2019	Larry Charles' Dangerous World of Comedy	Larry Charles	Netflix
2021	Slugfest		
2022	Captive Audience: A Real American Horror Story	Jessica Dimmock	High Five Content, Wonderburst
2022–present	From	John Griffin	Epix; MGM Television; Midnight Radio
2023–present	Citadel	Josh Appelbaum; Bryan Oh; David Weil	Amazon Studios; Midnight Radio
2024	Citadel: Diana	Alessandro Fabbri & Gina Gardini	Cattleya; Midnight Radio; Super Epic; Amazon MGM Studios
2024	Citadel: Honey Bunny	Sita Menon with Raj & DK	Amazon MGM Studios; Gozie AGBO; Midnight Radio; PKM; Picrow; D2R Films
TBA	Mercenary: An Extraction Series	Glen Mazzara	Netflix
