= Clark Evans =

Clark Evans may refer to:

- Clark Evans of YAML
- Clark Evans, fictional character in Invasion (2021 TV series)
