= Solos (TV series) =

2021 streaming television series

- Official poster
- Genre: Anthology; Science fiction; Drama
- Created by: David Weil
- Written by: David Weil; Tori Sampson; Stacy Osei-Kuffour; Bekka Bowling
- Directed by: David Weil; Sam Taylor-Johnson; Zach Braff; Tiffany Johnson
- Starring: Morgan Freeman; Anne Hathaway; Helen Mirren; Uzo Aduba; Anthony Mackie; Constance Wu; Dan Stevens; Nicole Beharie
- Narrated by: Morgan Freeman
- Country of origin: United States
- Original language: English
- No. of episodes: 7

Production
- Executive producers: David Weil; Sam Taylor-Johnson; Laura Lancaster
- Producers: Marc Sondheimer; Pixie Wespiser
- Running time: 21–32 minutes
- Production companies: Big Indie; Governor's Court; Amazon Studios

Original release
- Release: May 21, 2021

Solos is an American dramatic anthology television miniseries created by David Weil and produced by Amazon Studios. It stars Morgan Freeman, Anne Hathaway, Helen Mirren, Uzo Aduba, Anthony Mackie, Constance Wu, Dan Stevens and Nicole Beharie. The seven-episode series premiered on May 21, 2021 on Amazon Prime Video in UK, United States, Australia, Canada, Ireland, India, New Zealand and later that year in additional territories.

== Premise ==
The series questions what it means to be human, arguing that we are connected to others through shared experiences, even in our most isolated moments.

== Cast ==
- Morgan Freeman as Stuart, a patient in an Alzheimer's facility, later revealed to be a memory thief/junkie (by either hacking or by force). His confirmed thefts are Leah, Tom, Peg, Sasha, and Otto, whose memories he stole when Otto was a child, amongst hundreds of other victims. Freeman's character narrates the beginning of each episode and appears in his own
- Anne Hathaway as Leah, a scientist in 2024 trying to attempt time travel using "the Cauchy horizon"
- Anthony Mackie as Tom, an angry businessman who is later revealed to be the adoptive father of Peg. He also plays a robot designed to replace him when he dies
- Helen Mirren as Peg, a senior citizen who joins a space program because she felt invisible. Tom is her adoptive father
- Uzo Aduba as Sasha, a woman who has lived in her smart house for 20 years and thinks it is trying to trick her to leave
- Constance Wu as Jenny, a self-loathing, self-destructive woman who is in a waiting room and doesn't know why
- Nicole Beharie as Nera, a pregnant woman who gives birth during a blizzard lockdown to a son who ages quickly
- Dan Stevens as Otto, an NHS worker who steals a cure for Stuart to repair his Alzheimer's, later revealed that Stuart stole all his memories as a child on the day his mother died ("Stuart"). Stevens also voices Tym, the AI Space Shuttle in Peg's episode

=== Co-starring ===
- Hannah Dunne as the voice of Leah's sister Rachel ("Leah")
- Carol Smolinsky as the voice of Leah's mother ("Leah")
- Jack Quaid as the voice of Zen, Sasha's smart house ("Sasha")
- Sanaa Lathan as Nia, Sasha's best friend ("Sasha")
- Chris Diamantopoulos as the technician downloading Jenny's memories ("Jenny")
- James Monroe Iglehart as the voice of the supervising technician overseeing the procedure ("Jenny")
- Jacob is played by McCarrie McCausland at 15, Sephen Gray at 2, Percy Daggs IV at 6, and Andre Robinson at 11 ("Nera")

== Episodes ==
No.	Title	Directed by	Written by	Original release date
1	"LEAH"	Zach Braff	David Weil	May 21, 2021
Leah, a physicist, finally succeeds in communicating with the future, but her future self attempts to trick her into believing it failed. Leah's future self deeply regrets using time travel to escape the pain of watching her mother die. To avoid the same regret, Leah sends a warning to her past self, knowing it will cause her present and future selves to cease to exist.
2	"TOM"	David Weil	David Weil	May 21, 2021
Tom, a terminally ill businessman, purchases a robot duplicate to replace him when he dies. Tom clashes with the robot at first, put off by his own negative personality traits, but they form a bond as Tom talks about his family and how much he loves them.
3	"PEG"	Sam Taylor-Johnson	David Weil	May 21, 2021
Peg, a senior citizen, volunteers to explore space. She is the adoptive daughter of Tom, whose robot replaced him when he died, but she and her brother were raised by her grandparents in England. She signed up because she felt invisible and too scared to live her life. After resolving to live her remaining years without fear, she asks to return to Earth.
4	"SASHA"	David Weil	Tori Sampson	May 21, 2021
Sasha has lived alone in a smart home for 20 years following an apocalyptic pandemic. Although her home's AI insists it is safe to go outside, Sasha refuses, preferring the safety and predictability of her house. Sasha refuses an ultimatum by the home automation company, and the AI shuts itself off.
5	"JENNY"	David Weil	David Weil	May 21, 2021
Bored in a waiting room that she cannot remember entering, Jenny describes her unsatisfying marriage and how she befriended her neighbor's child in a failed attempt to seduce her neighbor. After she miscarried at a boring party, Jenny became drunk and fled. She is horrified to remember that she struck and killed her neighbor's child, a memory that is being stored by technicians.
6	"NERA"	Tiffany Johnson	Stacy Osei-Kuffour	May 21, 2021
A pregnant woman named Nera has a home birth. She worriedly calls her doctor, whose cryptic warnings are cut off by a bad connection. Her son, Jacob, rapidly ages, becoming years older every few minutes. The two at first distrust each other, but Nera bonds with Jacob after describing her lonely childhood as an abandoned baby.
7	"STUART"	Sam Taylor-Johnson	David Weil	May 21, 2021
Stuart is a patient at a home for Alzheimer's patients. Otto visits him, restores his memories, and says Stuart has stolen memories from hundreds of people, including all memories of his mother. Stuart wanted happy memories to replace his regrets. Otto takes back these stolen memories but leaves Stuart with the memory of their meeting.

== Production ==
Amazon Studios greenlit the series in October 2020. In February 2021, the title was announced. Weil is executive producer, and Laura Lancaster, Sam Taylor-Johnson and Pixie Wespiser produced. Weil makes his directorial debut directing three episodes and Taylor-Johnson directs two. Other directors for the series include Zach Braff and Tiffany Johnson. The cast was announced in February 2021, and their characters' names were announced in April 2021. Principal photography took place in Manhattan Beach, California from October 9 to November 19, 2020.

== Release ==
The series debuted on Amazon Prime Video on May 21, 2021, for the UK, United States, Australia, Canada, Ireland, India, New Zealand. Other territories debuted later that year.

== Reception ==
On Rotten Tomatoes, the miniseries holds an approval rating of 44% based on 32 critic reviews and an average rating of 5.80/10. The website's critical consensus reads, "A star-studded cast and a smattering of truly lovely moments can't save Solos from feeling stranded in space." On Metacritic, it has a weighted average score of 44 out of 100 based on 16 critic reviews, indicating "mixed or average reviews".
