= Extraction 3 =

- Directed by: Sam Hargrave
- Written by: Joe Russo; David Weil
- Based on: Ciudad by: Ande Parks; Joe Russo; Anthony Russo; Fernando León González (illustrations)
- Produced by: Joe Russo; Anthony Russo; Chris Hemsworth; Patrick Newall; Sam Hargrave; Mike Larocca; Angela Russo-Otstot; Eric Gitter; Peter Schwerin
- Starring: Chris Hemsworth; Golshifteh Farahani; Don Lee; Joe Taslim; Chi Lewis-Parry; Siena Agudong; Idris Elba; Pierce Brosnan
- Cinematography: Fraser Taggart
- Production companies: Wild State; AGBO; T.G.I.M. Films
- Distributed by: Netflix
- Country: United States
- Language: English

Extraction 3 is an upcoming American action thriller film directed by Sam Hargrave and written by Joe Russo and David Weil. It is based on the graphic novel Ciudad by Ande Parks, Joe Russo, Anthony Russo, Fernando León González and Eric Skillman. It is the sequel to Extraction 2, where Chris Hemsworth and Golshifteh Farahani reprise their roles from the first two films, and Idris Elba returning from Extraction 2. Don Lee, Joe Taslim, Chi Lewis-Parry, Siena Agudong, and Pierce Brosnan also star.

== Cast ==
- Chris Hemsworth as Tyler Rake, a former Australian SASR Operator turned black ops mercenary
- Golshifteh Farahani as Nik Khan, a mercenary and partner of Tyler
- Idris Elba as Alcott
- Don Lee as Tygo, a former child soldier turned mercenary.
- Joe Taslim
- Chi Lewis-Parry
- Siena Agudong
- Pierce Brosnan

== Production ==
In April 2024, Joe Russo confirmed that a sequel to Extraction 2 was in development, with Sam Hargrave returning to direct and Russo writing the screenplay, and Chris Hemsworth reprising his role as Tyler Rake. In July, Hemsworth mentioned that the writing process was going smoothly, that they were making sure that the story was good enough to basically follow the last two films. In April 2026, Golshifteh Farahani and Idris Elba were set to reprise their roles as Nik Khan and Alcott. The rest of the cast was announced in August 2026.

=== Filming ===
Principal photography began in July 2026 and it is expected to wrap on October 9, 2026, in Sydney, Wollongong, and Europe, with Fraser Taggart serving as the cinematographer.
