= Larry Charles' Dangerous World of Comedy =

American docu-series on Netflix

- Genre: Docu-series
- Created by: Larry Charles
- Directed by: Larry Charles
- Country of origin: United States
- Original language: English
- No. of seasons: 1
- No. of episodes: 4

Production
- Executive producers: Anthony Russo; Joseph Russo; Larry Charles; Mike Larocca
- Producers: Aaron Ohlmann; Alec Macrae; Jessica Pilot
- Cinematography: Matthew Nauser
- Production companies: Roam; AGBO

Original release
- Network: Netflix
- Release: February 15, 2019

Larry Charles' Dangerous World of Comedy is an American documentary television series that premiered on Netflix on February 15, 2019. The 4-part series follows the comedy writer and director Larry Charles, of ‘Borat’ and ‘The Dictator’ fame, as he "travels the world in search of humor in the most unusual, unexpected and dangerous places," such as Iraq, Somalia, Liberia, and Nigeria. He interviews comedians including Ahmad Al-Basheer, Trevor Noah, Brace "PissPigGranddad" Belden, and Hatoon Kadi. He also spends time exploring the American alt-right and its relationship to comedy, interviewing internet figures Anthime "Baked Alaska" Gionet and Andrew "Weev" Auernheimer.

== Episodes ==
No.	Title	Original release date
1	"Part 1: War - The Survivors"	February 15, 2019
Larry visits war victims in Iraq, where topical satire thrives but stand-up struggles, and Liberia, where comedy was revived by the Ebola crisis.
2	"Part 2: War - The Soldiers"	February 15, 2019
Larry interviews soldiers who have turned their painful combat experiences into comedy, including a veteran whose injuries fuel his stand-up routine.
3	"Part 3: Race"	February 15, 2019
In the U.S., Larry explores how racial division becomes comic fodder for minorities and immigrants -- as well as underground alt-right humorists.
4	"Part 4: Gender"	February 15, 2019
Larry examines the way comedians in Saudi Arabia and media stars in Nigeria struggle against or reinforce misogynistic and homophobic attitudes.
