= Tygo =

South Korean film by Lee Sang-yong

- Directed by: Lee Sang-yong
- Written by: Cha Woo-jin
- Based on: Ciudad by: Ande Parks; Joe Russo; Anthony Russo
- Produced by: Don Lee; Joe Russo; Anthony Russo; Angela Russo-Otstot; Michael Disco; Albert J. Kim; Won-ki Choi; Chris S. Lee
- Starring: Don Lee; Lee Jin-wook; Lalisa Manobal
- Production companies: Big Punch Pictures; AGBO; T.G.I.M. Films; Nova Film; B&C Content
- Distributed by: Netflix
- Country: South Korea
- Language: Korean

Tygo is an upcoming South Korean action thriller film directed by Lee Sang-yong and written by Cha Woo-jin. It is the third installment and first spin-off film of the Extraction franchise, based on the graphic novel Ciudad. The film stars Don Lee, Lee Jin-wook, and Lalisa Manobal. In the film, a former child soldier turned mercenary goes on a revenge mission through Korea's criminal underworld.

The film is set to be released on Netflix.

== Cast ==
- Don Lee as Tygo, a former child soldier turned mercenary
- Lee Jin-wook as Arman Choi, a crime boss who controls Korea's underground network
- Lalisa Manobal as Ria, a team member and companion of Tygo who is kidnapped by Arman Choi

== Production ==
In development for years, Netflix announced on December 2025 a spin-off film of the Extraction franchise set in South Korea titled Tygo. Produced by Big Punch Pictures, AGBO, and T.G.I.M. Films with co-producers Nova Film and B&C Content, the film was set to be written by Cha Woo-jin and directed by Lee Sang-yong. Don Lee, Lee Jin-wook, and Lalisa Manobal were revealed to be starring in the film, with the latter making her major film debut.

=== Filming ===
Principal photography began in South Korea in October 2025 and concluded in January 2026. Further filming occurred in Kota Tua Jakarta, Indonesia over 50 days in the first quarter of 2026, involving a shoot that encompassed major city road closures for large-scale action sequences. Filming officially wrapped on March 13, 2026.

== Release ==
Tygo is set to be released on Netflix.
