= Tori Sampson =

American dramatist and journalist

- Born: 20th century Boston, Massachusetts, U.S.
- Education: Ball State University (BS); Yale School of Drama (MFA)
- Occupation: Dramatist

Tori Sampson (born 20th century) is an African-American screenwriter and playwright.

== Early life and education ==
Born in Boston, Sampson moved to North Carolina with her family as a child. Her mother, Wanda Louise Thompson, raised Tori and her two sisters with values she learned through exposure to the Black power movement during her own childhood.

At age 14, one year after the death of her mother, Sampson and her twin sister were sent to a boarding school in Mississippi.

Sampson attended Ball State University, graduating with a bachelor's degree in sociology. She later graduated from the Yale School of Drama, where she studied playwriting.

== Career ==
Shortly after graduating from Yale, Sampson was awarded a 2017–2018 Jerome Fellowship from The Playwrights' Center and a 2018–2019 McKnight Fellowship.

Sampson's debut play, If Pretty Hurts, Ugly Must Be a Muhfucka, premiered in 2019 at Playwrights Horizons in New York City. That same year, her play Cadillac Crew was performed at the Yale Repertory Theatre.

Between 2020 and 2022, Sampson hosted an interview series for Wealthsimple titled "Friends With Money".

In 2021, she wrote an episode of the 2021 Amazon Prime Video miniseries Solos.

Sampson served as a writer on three series that aired in 2023, the Amazon Prime Video programs Citadel and Hunters as well as the Showtime series Three Women. Her play This Land Was Made debuted at the Vineyard Theater in New York City that year.

== List of works ==
=== Theatre ===
| Year | Title | Venue | Ref. |
|---|---|---|---|
| 2019 | If Pretty Hurts, Ugly Must Be a Muhfucka | Playwrights Horizons | |
| 2019 | Cadillac Crew | Yale Repertory Theatre | |
| 2023 | This Land Was Made | Vineyard Theatre | |

=== Television ===
| Year | Title | Notes | Ref. |
|---|---|---|---|
| 2021 | Solos | 1 episode | |
| 2023 | Hunters | 8 episodes | |
| 2023 | Three Women | 2 episodes | |
| 2026 | His & Hers | 2 episodes | |
| 2026 | Citadel | 1 episode | |
| 2026 | Spider-Noir | 1 episode | |
