= Jojo Macari =

English actor

- Education: Rose Bruford College
- Occupation: Actor
- Years active: 2018–present

Jojo Macari is an English actor and musician from London.

== Early life ==
Macari would work in his father's guitar shop in Soho, London. His first theatre experience was in the Jermyn Street Theatre production of A Level Playing Field. He was educated at Ardingly College. He dropped out of his A-levels in order to perform that role but was offered a deferred place to study actor musicianship at Rose Bruford College in Sidcup. He took a role in musical Desperate Measures, an adaptation of Shakespeare's Measure for Measure.

== Career ==
In 2018, Macari had his first major acting role in BBC One series Hard Sun. He joined the cast of Netflix miniseries Sex Education in series two and three as Kyle. He appeared as Prince Henry in the third season of Harlots. He appeared as Mogwan in two episodes of the Netflix fantasy drama Cursed. He played Billy on the Netflix show The Irregulars. Production on The Irregulars was interrupted by the COVID-19 pandemic, during filming Macari accidentally punched fellow actor Alex Ferns in the face, but Macari described Ferns, despite the sternness of some of his roles, "actually a lovely dude".

In 2023, he was cast as emperor Domitian in the Roland Emmerich gladiator epic Those About to Die. Macari appeared in the Apple TV+ series Masters of the Air in 2024.

In February 2025 Macari was tapped to play Mick Jagger in the biopic Faithfull about singer and actress Marianne Faithfull.

=== Music ===
Macari played in the pop-rock band Koates and the hardcore-punk band the Rats. Macari released the album Space and Time and Halloween and Paracetamol in 2021. In 2022, he appeared in the music video for the Sea Girls song Lonely. He also appeared in the video for Female Lead from the band Honeyglaze in 2022.

Around April 2023, Macari was playing with the band Famous at a festival in Germany.

== Filmography ==
Key
| † | Denotes works that have not yet been released |

| Year | Title | Role | Notes |
|---|---|---|---|
| 2018 | Hard Sun | Daniel | 6 episodes |
| 2018 | Endeavour | Queach | Episode: "Icarus" |
| 2019 | London Kills | Alfie | Episode: "The Ultimate Price" |
| 2019 | Harlots | Prince Henry | 5 episodes |
| 2019–2021 | Sex Education | Kyle | 7 episodes |
| 2020 | Misbehaviour | Dave | Feature film |
| 2020 | Cursed | Mogwan | 2 episodes |
| 2021 | The Irregulars | Billy | 8 episodes |
| 2022 | Morbius | Gabriel | Feature film |
| 2024 | Masters of the Air | Capt. Oran Petrich | Episode: "Part One" |
| 2024 | Those About to Die | Domitian Flavianus | 10 episodes |
| 2024 | Stags | Kai | |
| 2026 | Pressure | Andrew Carter | |
| TBA | Mercenary: An Extraction Series† | TBA | Filming |
