= Citadel (TV series) =

American spy action television series

- Genre: Action drama; Military science fiction; Spy thriller; Techno-thriller
- Created by: Josh Appelbaum; Bryan Oh; David Weil
- Showrunner: David Weil
- Directed by: Newton Thomas Sigel (season 1); Jessica Yu (season 1, episodes 3, 4); Joe Russo (season 2, episodes 1–4); David Weil (season 2, episode 5); Greg Yaitanes, (season 2, episodes 6, 7)
- Starring: Richard Madden; Priyanka Chopra; Stanley Tucci; Lesley Manville
- Composers: Alex Belcher (season 1); Jeff Russo (season 2)
- Country of origin: United States
- Original language: English
- No. of seasons: 2
- No. of episodes: 13

Production
- Executive producers: Jake Aust; Chris Castaldi; Scott Nemes; Newton Thomas Sigel; Sarah Bradshaw; Patrick Moran; Brian Kirk; Bryan Oh; Melissa Glenn; Jeff Pinkner; Scott Rosenberg; Josh Appelbaum; André Nemec; Mike Larocca; Angela Russo-Otstot; Anthony Russo; Joe Russo; David Weil
- Production location: United Kingdom
- Cinematography: Newton Thomas Sigel; Michael Wood
- Running time: 39–49 minutes
- Production companies: Amazon MGM Studios (Note: Credited as Amazon Studios for the first season.); Gozie AGBO; Midnight Radio; PKM; Picrow
- Budget: $300 million

Original release
- Network: Amazon Prime Video
- Release: April 28, 2023 – present

Related
- Citadel: Diana; Citadel: Honey Bunny

Citadel is an American spy action television series created by Josh Appelbaum, Bryan Oh, and David Weil for Amazon Prime Video with the Russo brothers acting as executive producers. It stars Richard Madden and Priyanka Chopra as secret agents Mason Kane and Nadia Sinh who, after being attacked by members of a rival agency and having their memories wiped, must reclaim their lost identities and fight back.

With a production budget of US$300 million, the six-episode first season ranks as one of the most expensive television series ever made. The first season premiered on April 28, 2023. In March 2023, it was renewed for a second season, with all seven episodes premiering on May 6, 2026.

Multiple non-English language spin-off shows were announced, with settings in the Italian Alps, India, Spain, and Mexico. The Italian series, Citadel: Diana, premiered on October 10, 2024, while the Indian series, Citadel: Honey Bunny, premiered on November 7, 2024.

== Cast ==
=== Main ===
- Richard Madden as
  - Mason Kane: a top-class Citadel spy agent; Nadia's husband and work partner; Asha's father
  - Kyle Conroy: Mason's identity after his memory was erased; Abby's husband (seasons 1-2)
- Priyanka Chopra as
  - Nadia Sinh: a top-class Citadel spy agent; Mason's wife and work partner; Asha's mother
  - Charlotte Vernon: Nadia's identity as a restaurant manager in Valencia after her memory was wiped
- Stanley Tucci as Bernard Orlick: a Citadel associate and key member of the spy team
- Lesley Manville as Dahlia Archer, a UK ambassador and Manticore agent
- Ashleigh Cummings as
  - Abby Conroy, Kyle's wife; Hendrix's mother
  - Celeste Graham, a former Citadel spy (season 2; recurring season 1)
- Jack Reynor as James Hutch, an off the grid CIA agent who tends to break the rules (season 2)
- Lina El Arabi as Celine Rohr (season 2)

=== Recurring ===
- Roland Møller as Anders and Davik Silje (season 1)
- Osy Ikhile as Carter Spence (seasons 1-2)
- Caoilinn Springall as Hendrix Conroy, Abby and Kyle's daughter (season 1)
- Matt Berry as Frank Sharpe (season 2)
- Michael Trucco as Benjamin Cash (season 2)
- Rahul Kohli as Charles Bantam (season 2)
- Merle Dandridge as Joana Malvern (season 2)
- Gabriel Leone as Paolo Braga (season 2)
- Rayna Vallandingham as Aparna (season 2)

=== Guests ===
- Moira Kelly as Joe (season 1)
- Timothy Busfield as Simmons (season 1)
- Nikki Amuka-Bird as Grace (season 1)
- Paul Bazely as Rahi Gambhir, the older version of Nadia's father (the younger version is played by Varun Dhawan in the prequel series Citadel: Honey Bunny) (season 1)

== Production ==
=== Development ===
Amazon Studios chief Jennifer Salke first came up with the idea for the series and approached the Russo brothers and their independent studio AGBO about creating an ambitious, global spy show in mid-2018. The series was originally a partnership between AGBO and the screenwriting collective Midnight Radio, comprising Josh Appelbaum and André Nemec. Appelbaum and Nemec departed the show during production in 2021, due to creative differences with the Russos. The Russos set up a second editing team and cut an alternate version of the season to compete with the main team, and Amazon chose the Russos' version after focus-group testings. This led to the hiring of David Weil as the new showrunner and extensive reshoots in 2022.

As of 2023, Citadel was the second most expensive series of all time with a budget of US$300 million, largely due to the reshoots following Weil's hiring. Prime Video renewed the series for a second season on March 14, 2023.

=== Casting ===
Starring alongside Madden and Chopra, Roland Møller will play Laszlo Milla, a lead operative of Citadel's rival intelligence agency, Manticore.

=== Filming ===
Filming on the main series began in January 2021 and wrapped the following December. However, reshoots occurred in early and mid-2022 under the supervision of Weil, the Russos, and director Thomas Sigel.

== Episodes ==
=== Series overview ===
Season	Episodes	Originally released	
Season	Episodes	First released	Last released
1	6	April 28, 2023	May 26, 2023
2	7	May 6, 2026	

=== Season 1 (2023) ===
No. overall	No. in season	Title	Directed by	Written by	Original release date
1	1	"The Human Enigma"	Newton Thomas Sigel	Teleplay by : David Weil; Story by : Josh Appelbaum & Bryan Oh and David Weil	April 28, 2023
Citadel spies Mason Kane and Nadia Sinh are presumed killed during a mission in Italy when they are ambushed by Manticore agents. Eight years later, Mason, with no memory of his previous identity, lives a quiet life as Kyle Conroy with his wife and daughter. When Citadel agent Bernard Orlick learns that he is alive, and that Manticore agent Dahlia Archer is after a top-secret Citadel X case, Orlick abducts Kyle and his family, reveals Kyle's past to him, and persuades him to help retrieve the case to keep its potentially world-altering data out of Manticore's hands.
2	2	"Spies Appear In Night Time"	Newton Thomas Sigel	David Weil and Bryan Oh	April 28, 2023
Nadia too survived the Italy mission. While escaping, she is held captive by an Italian man; she manages to kill him and escape, but her memory is remotely wiped out by Orlick. Eight years later, Kyle retrieves the Citadel X case, but Orlick is captured by Archer's men. After discovering that Nadia is alive living her life as Charlotte Vernon, Kyle contacts her, helping her regain her memory through a serum in the case.
3	3	"Infinite Shadows"	Newton Thomas Sigel; Jessica Yu	David Weil and Melissa Glenn	May 5, 2023
Kyle's vulnerable and confused state makes him susceptible to false stories and propaganda, leading to the question of whether he will trust Nadia or if they will go their separate ways after the crucial mission.
4	4	"Tell Her Everything"	Newton Thomas Sigel; Jessica Yu	Teleplay by : Josh Appelbaum & Bryan Oh and David Weil; Story by : Josh Appelbaum & Bryan Oh	May 12, 2023
In Morocco, Kyle and Nadia enter the Manticore Black Site to rescue Carter. They tackle an army of unnamed goons, with Nadia taking the lead. However, Kyle is still rusty in battle, as his memories and previous skills were lost forever. He nervously follows Nadia’s direction. They quickly make their way to Carter’s cell. The traumatized prisoner looks up at Kyle and blames him for this incarceration. The series then jumps back to ten years earlier. Mason and Nadia are living it up in Paris, where they are slowly falling in love with one another. Nadia informs Mason that a new agent is joining the team. She worked with this spy before, and the agent ended up saving Nadia’s life.
5	5	"Time Renders Us Enemies"	Newton Thomas Sigel	Teleplay by : David Weil and Bryan Oh; Story by : David Weil and Bryan Oh & Angela Russo-Otstot	May 19, 2023
Mason learns that Nadia has a secret daughter, shaking the trust between them. As they confront their complicated past, Bernard helps them stay ahead of Manticore. With loyalties in question, the line between ally and enemy grows increasingly blurred, pushing them closer to uncovering Citadel’s true downfall.
6	6	"Secrets in Night Need Early Rains"	Newton Thomas Sigel	Josh Appelbaum & Bryan Oh	May 26, 2023
Kyle, Nadia, and Carter retrieve nuclear cores from a submarine, hoping to trade them for Mason and Nadia’s daughter, Asha. The tense exchange in Valencia leads to a firefight, but Kyle saves Asha just in time. Dahlia Archer fakes her death after failing Manticore. Mason regains his lost memories, discovering he was manipulated into betraying Citadel, believing it would protect his family.

=== Season 2 (2026) ===
No. overall	No. in season	Title	Directed by	Written by	Original release date
7	1	"Baked Alaskas"	Joe Russo	David Weil	May 6, 2026
Kyle, Nadia, and Bernard are in hiding across Europe. While Kyle grapples with identity issues and Nadia flees with her daughter, Bernard teams up with former CIA agent Hutch to stop Paulo Braga. A secret emerges when Nadia confronts Frank Sharpe.
8	2	"Cold Plunge"	Joe Russo	David J. Rosen	May 6, 2026
Abby's escape sets off a chain of deadly events. Paulo and Joana advance their weapon as they pursue Kyle. Bernard and Hutch race to reunite the group. Kyle seeks help from an old enemy and uncovers Bernard's dark secret.
9	3	"Chinos"	Joe Russo	Gursimran Sandhu and David J. Rosen	May 6, 2026
As Paulo's plan accelerates, Kyle and Nadia are forced into an uneasy alliance. Along with Bernard, Hutch, Celine, and Frank Sharpe, they mount a daring mission to uncover the identity of a mysterious hacker.
10	4	"Unreasonable"	Joe Russo	Tori Sampson and David Weil and David J. Rosen	May 6, 2026
After extracting Edison's true identity, the team pivots to a high-profile gala where their target is expected to appear. Tensions rise between Kyle and Nadia. As enemies close in, a dishonest decision threatens to end the entire mission.
11	5	"Heirlooms"	David Weil	David Weil and Kennedy Edmonds	May 6, 2026
Kyle and Dahlia set up a high-risk prisoner exchange to negotiate Abby's release. But as Kyle's unraveling threatens to derail the plan, both sides race to execute the exchange, leading to a shocking revelation from Abby.
12	6	"Highlands"	Greg Yaitanes	David Weil and David J. Rosen	May 6, 2026
As Joana accelerates plans to assassinate the Russian president, Kyle and Nadia take Abby to a safe house in Scotland. But when they discover the horrifying truth about what was done to Abby, it sets off a devastating chain of events.
13	7	"Chin Chin"	Greg Yaitanes	David Weil and David J. Rosen	May 6, 2026
Citadel agents race to prevent Joana from assassinating President Aronov at the G8 Summit, where she plans to take control of Russian satellites.

== Music ==
Jeff Russo was hired to write the score for season 2 which was recorded in April 2025 at London's Air Lyndhurst Studio.
Alex Belcher composed the first season, while Henry Jackman served as score producer. Sony Classical released the soundtrack.

Citadel (Prime Video Original Series Soundtrack)
No.	Title	Length
1.	"Citadel (Main Title Theme)"	1:19
2.	"The Train"	3:37
3.	"Bathroom Brawl"	4:45
4.	"Derailed"	3:38
5.	"Amnesia"	2:21
6.	"I Deserve to Know"	1:50
7.	"Family"	1:50
8.	"Taken"	1:07
9.	"The Brothers"	0:54
10.	"Dahlia Interviewed"	1:34
11.	"A Myth"	2:22
12.	"Backstory"	2:48
13.	"Backwoods Kidnapping"	1:45
14.	"Backstop"	2:20
15.	"It's Time"	2:12
16.	"Exceedingly Untrustworthy"	3:44
17.	"Message to Abbey"	1:20
18.	"Valencia"	0:50
19.	"You're Nadia"	1:11
20.	"Did You Just Throw a Knife?"	1:15
21.	"Nadia Back with a Vengeance"	4:14
22.	"Captured"	1:42
23.	"Stitched Up"	3:15
24.	"Ski Sequence"	4:40
25.	"They Meet"	2:03
26.	"Quite a Story"	1:39
27.	"Nadia & Mason"	1:13
28.	"Blacksite"	1:08
29.	"Rescue Mission"	2:31
30.	"Kiss & Tell"	2:22
31.	"The New Tier 1"	4:49
32.	"Interrogated"	5:00
33.	"You Only Get One Soul"	3:47
34.	"You Did This"	2:46
35.	"What if It Was Real?"	1:08
36.	"Headshot"	1:32
37.	"Did He Know?"	1:29
38.	"Can a Spy Truly Love?"	4:01
39.	"Goodbye"	2:07
40.	"The Truth"	3:35
41.	"The Bracelet"	2:21
42.	"Red Cell Mission"	5:14
43.	"A Seat at the Table"	1:54
44.	"Deactivating the Cores"	4:32
45.	"Reuniting"	2:14
46.	"A Favor"	6:39
Total length:		120:37

== Release ==
The series had its world premiere, with the release of the first two episodes, on 14 April 2023 as the surprise screening for the opening night of the Sands Film Festival in St Andrews, Scotland. The six-episode first season premiered on Amazon Prime Video on April 28, 2023, with its first two episodes.

The second season premiered on May 6, 2026, with all seven episodes.

== Spin-offs ==
Citadel includes spin-off shows in different languages set in the Italian Alps, India, Spain, and Mexico. The Italian series, titled Citadel: Diana, is produced by Cattleya, part of ITV Studios, and was released in 2024. At the end of season 1 of Citadel, there was a trailer for Citadel: Diana. The series was aired on October 9, 2024. The Indian series, titled Citadel: Honey Bunny, starring Varun Dhawan and Samantha Ruth Prabhu, was directed by Raj & DK and revolves around the story of Honey and Bunny, who are the parents of the character Nadia Sinh. It premiered on November 7, 2024. Both spin-offs were cancelled after their first seasons.

== Reception ==
=== Critical response ===
For the first season, the review aggregator website Rotten Tomatoes reported a 51% approval rating with an average rating of 5.7/10, based on 79 critic reviews. The website's critics consensus reads, "Citadel spares no expense but still feels underdeveloped, yielding a fairly fun spy caper that nonetheless creaks under the weight of its own exorbitance." Metacritic, which uses a weighted average, assigned a score of 51 out of 100 based on 29 critics, indicating "mixed or average reviews".

The Economist called it "a big-budget, low-imagination thriller with plenty of explosions and no surprises." Despite the criticism it was picked up for a second season that released in 2026.

The second season has a 71% approval rating on Rotten Tomatoes based on seven reviews, with an average rating of 5.4/10.

Screen Rant praised the season's action sequences, writing that the show features "the very best" choreography and fight scenes among Prime Video's action thriller originals, and noted that director Joe Russo's "sharp and high-octane direction" was evident from the opening episode. Indian entertainment publication Bollywood Hungama gave the season a positive review, calling it "a fast-paced thriller" and noting that it "benefits from Priyanka Chopra Jonas' action avatar." M.N. Miller of FandomWire wrote that the second season "finds enough pulpy spy-thriller fun and unexpected charm in Stanley Tucci's scene-stealing turn to make the self-indulgent series an entertaining, but still disposable watch."

=== Viewership ===
According to streaming measurement service FlixPatrol, the first season debuted at number two on Prime Video's Top 10 Shows and Top 10 Overall rankings in the United States in its opening week, surpassing other Prime Video titles including Invincible.

The second season briefly reached the top 5 in Prime Video's global streaming charts in its opening days, with competition from the presently airing final season of The Boys.

=== Accolades ===
Citadel was nominated for two awards at the 22nd Visual Effects Society Awards.
