= Invasion (2021 TV series) =

American science fiction television series

- Genre: Drama; Science fiction
- Created by: Simon Kinberg; David Weil
- Starring: Golshifteh Farahani; Shamier Anderson; Shioli Kutsuna; Firas Nassar; Billy Barratt; Azhy Robertson; Tara Moayedi; Daisuke Tsuji; Sam Neill; India Brown; Paddy Holland; Enver Gjokaj; Nedra Marie Taylor; Naian González Norvind; Shane Zaza; Erika Alexander
- Music by: Max Richter; Bobby Krlic (season 2)
- Country of origin: United States
- Original languages: English; Japanese; Persian
- No. of seasons: 3
- No. of episodes: 30

Production
- Executive producers: Jakob Verbruggen; Audrey Chon; Amy Kaufman; Andrew Baldwin; Simon Kinberg; David Weil; Elisa Ellis
- Running time: 33–58 minutes
- Production companies: Kinberg Genre; Boat Rocker Media; Apple Studios (season 2)

Original release
- Network: Apple TV+
- Release: October 22, 2021 – October 10, 2025
- Network: Apple TV
- Release: October 17 – October 24, 2025

Invasion is an American science fiction television series created by Simon Kinberg and David Weil that premiered on Apple TV+ on October 22, 2021. The show is broadcast in a multilingual format, where the English track also features characters speaking in other original languages, such as Japanese, and Persian. It has received a mixed critical response. In Germany, the show is called Infiltration. It was renewed for a second season in December 2021, which premiered on August 23, 2023. It was renewed for a third season in February 2024, and premiered on August 22, 2025.

== Premise ==
Earth is visited by an alien species that threatens humanity's existence. Events unfold in real time through the eyes of a handful of ordinary people across the globe as they struggle to make sense of the increasing chaos around them.

== Cast ==
=== Main ===
- Golshifteh Farahani as Aneesha Malik
- Shamier Anderson as Trevante Cole
- Shioli Kutsuna as Mitsuki Yamato
- Firas Nassar as Ahmed "Manny" Malik (season 1)
- Billy Barratt as Caspar Morrow (seasons 1–2; recurring season 3)
- Azhy Robertson as Luke Malik (seasons 1–2; recurring season 3)
- Tara Moayedi as Sarah Malik (seasons 1–2; recurring season 3)
- Daisuke Tsuji as Kaito Kawaguchi (season 1)
- Sam Neill as Jim Bell Tyson (pilot: "Last Day")
- India Brown as Jamila Huston (season 2–present; recurring season 1)
- Paddy Holland as Monty Cuttermill (season 2; recurring season 1)
- Enver Gjokaj as Clark Evans (season 2–present)
- Nedra Marie Taylor as Rose Callaway (season 2)
- Naian González Norvind as Maya Castillo (season 2)
- Shane Zaza as Nikhil (season 3; recurring season 2)
- Erika Alexander as Verna (season 3)

=== Recurring ===
- Alex Hernandez as Chavez (season 1)
- Olivia-Mai Barrett as Ryder Evans
- Rinko Kikuchi as Hinata
- Togo Igawa as Ikuro Murai
- Tamara Lawrance as Learah
- Louis Toghill as Darwin Charles
- Cache Vanderpuye as Alfie Ademura
- Eric Lange as Jack Hollander (season 3)

== Episodes ==
Season	Episodes	Originally released		
Season	Episodes	First released	Last released	Network
1	10	October 22, 2021	December 10, 2021	Apple TV+
2	10	August 23, 2023	October 25, 2023	Apple TV+
3	10	August 22, 2025	October 24, 2025	Apple TV+ Apple TV

=== Season 1 (2021) ===
No. overall	No. in season	Title	Directed by	Written by	Original release date
1	1	"Last Day"	Jakob Verbruggen	Simon Kinberg & David Weil	October 22, 2021
2	2	"Crash"	Jakob Verbruggen	Simon Kinberg & David Weil	October 22, 2021
3	3	"Orion"	Jamie Payne	Simon Kinberg & David Weil	October 22, 2021
4	4	"The King Is Dead"	Jamie Payne	Simon Kinberg	October 29, 2021
5	5	"Going Home"	Amanda Marsalis	Simon Kinberg	November 5, 2021
6	6	"Home Invasion"	Amanda Marsalis	Andrew Baldwin	November 12, 2021
7	7	"Hope"	Amanda Marsalis	Story by : Simon Kinberg and David J. Rosen; Teleplay by : Simon Kinberg & Andrew Baldwin	November 19, 2021
8	8	"Contact"	Amanda Marsalis	Story by : Andrew Baldwin & Simon Kinberg and Gursimran Sandhu; Teleplay by : Andrew Baldwin & Simon Kinberg	November 25, 2021
9	9	"Full of Stars"	Jakob Verbruggen	Andrew Baldwin & Simon Kinberg	December 3, 2021
10	10	"First Day"	Jakob Verbruggen	Andrew Baldwin & Simon Kinberg	December 10, 2021

=== Season 2 (2023) ===
No. overall	No. in season	Title	Directed by	Written by	Original release date
11	1	"Something's Changed"	Alik Sakharov	Simon Kinberg	August 23, 2023
12	2	"Chasing Ghosts"	Alik Sakharov	Tatiana Suarez-Pico	August 30, 2023
13	3	"Fireworks"	Alik Sakharov	Aditi Brennan Kapil	September 6, 2023
14	4	"The Tunnel"	Brad Anderson	Dan Dietz	September 13, 2023
15	5	"A Voice from the Other Side"	Alik Sakharov	Donald Joh	September 20, 2023
16	6	"Pressure Points"	Brad Anderson	Story by : Uzoamaka Maduka and Donald Joh; Teleplay by : Donald Joh	September 27, 2023
17	7	"Down the Rabbit Hole"	Brad Anderson	Dan Dietz	October 4, 2023
18	8	"Cosmic Ocean"	Claudia Llosa	Aditi Brennan Kapil	October 11, 2023
19	9	"Breakthrough"	Mathias Herndl	Tatiana Suarez-Pico	October 18, 2023
20	10	"Old Friends, New Frontiers"	Mathias Herndl	Simon Kinberg & Dan Dietz	October 25, 2023

=== Season 3 (2025) ===
No. overall	No. in season	Title	Directed by	Written by	Original release date
21	1	"The Ones We Leave Behind"	Alik Sakharov	Simon Kinberg	August 22, 2025
22	2	"The Message"	Alik Sakharov	Dan Dietz	August 29, 2025
23	3	"Infinitas"	Sylvain White	Aditi Brennan Kapil	September 5, 2025
24	4	"The Mission"	Sylvain White	Glenise Mullins	September 12, 2025
25	5	"Point of No Return"	Daisy von Scherler Mayer	Donald Joh	September 19, 2025
26	6	"Marilyn"	Daisy von Scherler Mayer	Vivian Barnes	September 26, 2025
27	7	"Outpost 17"	Brad Anderson	Aditi Brennan Kapil	October 3, 2025
28	8	"Life in the Dead Zone"	Alik Sakharov	Dan Dietz	October 10, 2025
29	9	"Homecoming"	Brad Anderson	Vivian Barnes & Glenise Mullins	October 17, 2025
30	10	"The End of the Line"	Alik Sakharov	Simon Kinberg & Demetrios Cokinos	October 24, 2025

== Production ==
=== Development ===
Apple gave an order for ten episodes in January 2019 with Simon Kinberg and David Weil creating and writing, as well as executive-producing with Audrey Chon. Deadline reported that Chad Feehan was briefly brought in as a showrunner "out of necessity" but soon departed the series in September 2019. When the resumption of filming was announced, Jakob Verbruggen was listed as director and executive producer with Amy Kaufman, Andrew Baldwin and Elisa Ellis also executive producers; however, it was subsequently reported that Amanda Marsalis had also directed some episodes. The first season was reported to have a $200 million budget. On December 8, 2021, Apple renewed the series for a second season. The show was renewed for a third season on February 13, 2024.

=== Casting ===
Deadline revealed in August 2020 that Neill, Anderson, Farahani, Nassar, and Kutsuna were all to be part of the cast.

=== Filming ===
Filming was originally planned to start in mid-2019, with Kinberg directing, but was delayed due to his work on the feature film The 355. According to a report by Deadline, Invasion planned to film in New York, Manchester, Morocco and Japan. "Portions of the series had been shot in New York and Morocco, and producers were prepping for the UK shoot when the coronavirus-related industry shutdown started in mid-March." In February 2021, filming occurred in Greenwich, one of the series' last filming locations. Filming for the first season concluded on March 15, 2021.

== Release ==
The series premiered on Apple TV+ on October 22, 2021, with the release of its first three episodes; the first season concluded on December 10, 2021. Its second season premiered on August 23, 2023. The third season premiered on August 22, 2025.

== Reception ==
The review aggregator website Rotten Tomatoes reported a 48% approval rating for the first season, with an average rating of 5.6/10, based on 42 critic reviews. The website's critics consensus reads, "Invasion attempts a slow burn but inadvertently lets its tension completely fizzle out with leaden pacing that will leave viewers impatient for the alien apocalypse to finally arrive." Metacritic, which uses a weighted average, assigned a score of 51 out of 100 based on 15 critics, indicating "mixed or average reviews".

RogerEbert.com reviewer Nick Allen called the series "a thrilling series about people, not aliens", adding that the series "is a refreshing and often thrilling juggling of plot-threads that involve incredibly flawed or hurtful decisions made in the name of survival".

Andrew Webster, writing for The Verge, said that "Apple's Invasion feels like the first chapter of a sci-fi epic", adding "This all means that when the aliens do finally appear, it’s a huge deal."

Daniel Fienberg, writing for The Hollywood Reporter, said that "Invasion verges on 10 episodes of setup so pure and unfulfilling that a better title would be Evasion". He called the series, "amusing at first, then annoying, and finally, simply confusing", but praised Sam Neill's single-episode performance in the pilot.

For the second season, Rotten Tomatoes reported a 67% approval rating with an average rating of 6.1/10, based on 12 critic reviews. The website's critics consensus reads, "A marked improvement if not a wholehearted vindication, Invasion's second season explores the fallout of an alien takeover with impressive scope." Metacritic gave it a score of 63 out of 100 based on 4 critics, indicating "generally favorable reviews". Chase Hutchinson, writing for Collider, said "In its ten-episode return, the science fiction series makes its first season more like a prologue for the story it really wanted to tell."

For the third season, Rotten Tomatoes reported a 67% approval rating, based on 6 reviews.

=== Accolades ===
Invasion was nominated in the category of Outstanding Effects Simulations in an Episode, Commercial, Game Cinematic or Real-Time Project at the 22nd Visual Effects Society Awards.
