= Mike Larocca =

American film producer

Mike Larocca is an American film and television producer. In 2016, he co-founded and was president and Vice Chairman of the Russo brothers' AGBO Productions until he resigned in 2023. In January 2024, he launched Department M, a production and financing company, alongside Michael Schaefer. In July 2026, Department M formally acquired a majority stake in Neon and Larocca was appointed as a board member.

== Filmography ==
=== Films ===
Year	Title	Credit	Notes
2011	Rise of the Planet of the Apes	Co-producer	
2013	Oblivion	Co-producer	
2014	The Drop		
2015	Spy	Executive producer	
2019	Mosul		
2019	21 Bridges		
2020	Relic	Executive producer	
2020	Extraction		
2021	Cherry		
2022	Everything Everywhere All at Once		
2022	The Gray Man		
2023	Extraction 2		
2025	The Electric State		
2025	The Hand That Rocks the Cradle		
TBA	Extraction 3		

Miscellaneous crew

Year	Film	Role
2004	The Stepford Wives	Executive assistant: Scott Rudin
2004	The Manchurian Candidate	Executive assistant: Scott Rudin
2004	The Village	Executive assistant: Scott Rudin
2004	I Heart Huckabees	Executive assistant: Scott Rudin
2004	The Life Aquatic with Steve Zissou	Executive assistant: Scott Rudin
2007	Balls of Fury	Assistant: Derek Evans

=== Television ===
Year	Title	Credit	Notes
2019	Larry Charles' Dangerous World of Comedy	Executive producer	
2019	Deadly Class	Executive producer	
2022	From	Executive producer	
2022	Captive Audience	Executive producer	Documentary
2023	Citadel	Executive producer	
TBA	Quantum and Woody	Executive producer	
TBA	The Warriors	Executive producer	
