= Extraction 2 =

2023 film by Sam Hargrave

- Promotional release poster
- Directed by: Sam Hargrave
- Written by: Joe Russo
- Based on: Ciudad by: Ande Parks; Joe Russo; Anthony Russo; Fernando León González (illustrations)
- Produced by: Joe Russo; Anthony Russo; Chris Hemsworth; Patrick Newall; Sam Hargrave; Mike Larocca; Angela Russo-Otstot; Eric Gitter; Peter Schwerin
- Starring: Chris Hemsworth; Golshifteh Farahani; Adam Bessa; Tornike Gogrichiani; Tornike Bziava; Tinatin Dalakishvili; Daniel Bernhardt; Olga Kurylenko; Idris Elba
- Cinematography: Greg Baldi
- Edited by: Álex Rodríguez; William Hoy
- Music by: Henry Jackman; Alex Belcher
- Production companies: Wild State; AGBO; T.G.I.M. Films
- Distributed by: Netflix
- Release date: June 16, 2023
- Running time: 123 minutes
- Country: United States
- Language: English

Extraction 2 is a 2023 American action thriller film directed by Sam Hargrave and written by Joe Russo, based on the graphic novel Ciudad. It is the second installment in the Extraction franchise. Chris Hemsworth, Golshifteh Farahani and Adam Bessa reprise their roles from the first film, while Tornike Gogrichiani, Tornike Bziava, Tinatin Dalakishvili, Daniel Bernhardt, Olga Kurylenko and Idris Elba appear in pivotal roles. In the film, Tyler Rake is initially hired to rescue the family of a crime lord from a prison in Georgia.

Following the successful debut of the first film, Netflix announced a sequel in May 2020 with Joe Russo returning to write, Hargrave returning to direct and Hemsworth returning in the lead. By December, Joe and his brother Anthony hoped that the sequel would develop the characters enough to start a cinematic universe. Filming was scheduled to begin in Sydney in September 2021, but was delayed by the COVID-19 pandemic and eventually started in Prague in November, before concluding in Vienna in April 2022. In addition to the returns of the Russos, Hargrave and Hemsworth, Henry Jackman and Alex Belcher returned to compose the score.

Extraction 2 was released by Netflix on June 16, 2023 to positive reviews from critics. The film was nominated for Best Stunts (Action) at the 6th Hollywood Critics Association Midseason Film Awards.

== Plot ==
After barely surviving a previous mission in Dhaka, (Note: As depicted in Extraction (2020)) Tyler Rake is airlifted for medical treatment to Dubai, and after recovery, retires from mercenary work to a cabin in Gmunden to recuperate. Tyler is later approached by a stranger and asked to rescue Tyler's ex-wife Mia's sister Ketevan and her two children Sandro and Nina. Ketevan married Davit Radiani, one of the co-leaders of the largest crime syndicate of Georgia called Nagazi, which Davit founded with his brother Zurab. After having killed a DEA agent, Davit was imprisoned and unable to bribe his way out due to the pressure from the Americans. Davit forces Ketevan and her children to move into the prison to keep them from leaving him, but the poor living conditions and Davit's abuse causes Ketevan to call Mia for help. Tyler recruits Nik and her brother Yaz to join him in the mission.

They infiltrate the prison with the help of a bribed guard, but the prisoners are alerted and a riot ensues. During the extraction, Davit attacks Tyler and Ketevan, resulting in Tyler killing Davit. Tyler and Ketevan fight through the riot and board an armored train. After fighting off Nagazi forces, they escape to Vienna through a plane, but Sandro, who idolizes his father and was influenced by the Nagazi's cult-like loyalty, secretly contacts Zurab and reveals their location. Zurab and his men find and attack Tyler and his team in their DC Towers safehouse in Vienna. Ketevan scolds Sandro for endangering his own family. In the chaos, Sandro abandons his mother and joins Zurab.

After killing most of Zurab's men, the team flees in one of his helicopters, but Zurab mortally wounds Yaz. The team retreats to Tyler's cabin, where he and Ketevan are reunited with Mia. Tyler apologizes to Mia for leaving on a mission before their son died from cancer, regretful that the last memory he had was Tyler leaving him. Zurab's right-hand man and uncle Avtandil discourages Zurab from seeking revenge to prevent more losses and to set a better example for Sandro. Refusing to accept defeat, Zurab kills Avtandil and contacts Tyler, telling him to meet at a nearby airfield next to a church. Tyler heads to the airfield, but leaves Nik behind in order to prevent risking her life. Tyler kills the remaining Nagazi and finds Zurab and Sandro in the church, with Sandro wearing an explosive vest. Zurab forces Sandro to take Tyler's pistol, but Sandro refuses to shoot Tyler after realizing the kind of men Davit and Zurab really are.

Nik arrives and disarms the vest, while Tyler kills Zurab. Nik and Tyler are captured by the police and imprisoned. Mia visits Tyler and informs him that Ketevan and her children have been moved to protective custody, but their assets have been frozen. Tyler tells her to give them $1 million cash, which is hidden under the floorboards in his cabin. Mia assures Tyler that their son died confident that his father was a hero. Tyler and Nik are taken out of prison to meet with the stranger, who assigns them for another mission.

== Cast ==
- Chris Hemsworth as Tyler Rake, a former Australian SASR Operator turned black ops mercenary
- Golshifteh Farahani as Nik Khan, a mercenary and partner of Tyler
- Adam Bessa as Yaz Khan, Nik's brother and a member of Nik and Tyler's crew
- Tornike Gogrichiani as Zurab Radiani
- Tornike Bziava as Davit Radiani
- Tinatin Dalakishvili as Ketevan Radiani, Mia's sister, Davit's wife, Sandro and Nina's mother
- Andro Japaridze as Sandro Radiani, Davit's and Ketevan's teenage son
- Miriam and Marta Kovziashvili as Nina Radiani, Davit's and Ketevan's young daughter
- Dato Bakhtadze as Avtandil
- Daniel Bernhardt as Konstantine
- Irakli Kvirikadze as Ivayne
- Levan Saginashvili as Vakhtang
- George Lasha as Sergo
- Olga Kurylenko as Mia, Tyler's ex-wife and sister of Ketevan
- Idris Elba as the unnamed stranger (credited as "Alcott")

Additionally, director Sam Hargrave has a cameo appearance as a gravedigger.

== Production ==
=== Development ===
In May 2020, it was reported Joe Russo had been hired to write a sequel to the film, with the intention of both Sam Hargrave and Chris Hemsworth returning. Hemsworth was paid $20 million for his involvement. In December 2020, the Russo Brothers stated that beyond the sequel they hope to develop a series of films set within the world of Extraction to not only explore some of the characters that were introduced in the first film but to potentially launch a cinematic universe. In January 2021, it was rumored that the Russo brothers were also working on an origin story for Randeep Hooda's character Saju.

=== Filming ===
Filming for the sequel was slated to begin in Sydney, New South Wales, Australia in September 2021, but measures related to the COVID-19 pandemic moved production to Prague. On November 29, 2021, Hargrave announced that principal photography had begun in Prague, Czech Republic, before Hemsworth announced that he began filming his scenes on December 4. Further shooting began in Vienna, Austria on January 28, 2022, and lasted until February 14, 2022. Scenes were shot at Donau City in the vicinity of the DC Towers. Filming officially wrapped on April 6, 2022. The film was shot on the ARRI ALEXA Mini LF cameras by implementing the same long-take strategies from the first film. Reshoots for the film took place in Prague in November 2022.

== Release ==
Netflix held a premiere in New York City on June 12, 2023, with the cast in attendance. It was released by Netflix on June 16, 2023.

== Reception ==
=== Audience viewership ===
According to viewership estimates reported by Media Play News and sourced from PlumResearch, Extraction 2 drew approximately 5.3 million unique viewers and 8.5 million hours watched worldwide on Netflix during the week of June 26 to July 2, 2023.

=== Critical response ===
On the review aggregator website Rotten Tomatoes, 80% of 138 critics' reviews are positive, with an average rating of 6.7/10. The website's consensus reads: "Bigger, bolder, and in some respects even better than its predecessor, Extraction 2 is an over-the-top action thriller done right." Metacritic, which uses a weighted average, assigned the film a score of 57 out of 100, based on 29 critics, indicating "mixed or average" reviews.

Helen O'Hara of Empire gave 4 out of 5 stars and wrote in favour of the movie "A couple of extended action sequences threaten to get too much, but Hargrave just about pulls it back, and adds a couple of witty touches, once again employing a rake as a deadly weapon and putting in what's surely a deliberate nod to Thor for a giggle." The Indian Express wrote "Extraction 2's relatively restrained final showdown can't help but feel a little anticlimactic." Critic Matt Donato of IGN opined "Some of that is lost in the annoyingly shaky camera and a few effects shots are questionable, but thankfully, the important things are done right." Gopinath Rajendran of The Hindu opined "But for everything Extraction 2 lacks, the awesome action set-pieces that are unique to the franchise almost make up for it. Loved the 12-minute single-shot action scene in the first film? The sequel features a 21-minute scene of the same ilk." Peter Bradshaw of The Guardian gave 1 out of 5 stars and stated "The first Extraction was entertaining enough but this new one is just cynically about extracting the cash."

Extraction 2 was nominated for Best Stunts at the 6th Hollywood Critics Association Midseason Film Awards.

== Sequel ==
In June 2023 at that year's Netflix Tudum festival, it was announced that Extraction 3 was in development. Stating that the company identifies Extraction as a franchise, the official logo was revealed. Chris Hemsworth will reprise his role, with Sam Hargrave directing the film. On October 8, 2025, Hargrave stated that Extraction 3 will begin filming in 2026, with an anticipated release in 2027. Extraction 2 cast members Golshifteh Farahani, Olga Kurylenko, and Idris Elba are expected to return for the sequel.
