= Extraction (2020 film) =

American film by Sam Hargrave

- Promotional release poster
- Directed by: Sam Hargrave
- Screenplay by: Joe Russo
- Based on: Ciudad by Ande Parks, Joe Russo, Anthony Russo
- Produced by: Joe Russo; Anthony Russo; Mike Larocca; Chris Hemsworth; Eric Gitter; Peter Schwern
- Starring: Chris Hemsworth; Rudhraksh Jaiswal; Randeep Hooda; Priyanshu Painyuli; Golshifteh Farahani; Pankaj Tripathi; David Harbour
- Cinematography: Newton Thomas Sigel
- Edited by: Peter B. Ellis; Ruthie Aslan
- Music by: Henry Jackman; Alex Belcher
- Production companies: AGBO; Thematic Entertainment; India Take One Productions; T.G.I.M. Films
- Distributed by: Netflix
- Release date: April 24, 2020
- Running time: 117 minutes
- Countries: United States; Australia; India
- Language: English
- Budget: $65 million

Extraction is a 2020 American action thriller film directed by Sam Hargrave and written by Joe Russo, based on the 2014 graphic novel Ciudad. It is the first installment in the Extraction franchise. The film stars Chris Hemsworth, Rudhraksh Jaiswal, Randeep Hooda, Golshifteh Farahani, Pankaj Tripathi and David Harbour. In the film, an Australian mercenary takes on a mission to save an Indian drug lord's kidnapped son in Dhaka, Bangladesh, but the mission goes awry when he is double-crossed.

Development of the film began in 2018. The Russo brothers, who were part of the writing team on Ciudad, had always intended to adapt the novel for the screen. Netflix released Extraction on April 24, 2020. It received mixed reviews and became the most-watched original film in Netflix's history, with over 99 million viewers during the first four weeks. A sequel, Extraction 2, was released in 2023, with the main cast returning.

== Plot ==
Ovi Mahajan Jr., son of incarcerated Indian drug lord Ovi Mahajan Sr., sneaks out of his house to attend a club with his friends. There, Ovi and one of his friends sneakily try smoking Marijuana when corrupt police officers working for rival Bangladeshi drug lord Amir Asif catch them and then shoot and kill Ovi's friend and kidnap him.

Saju Rav — a former lieutenant colonel in the Indian Army Para Special Forces and Ovi Jr.'s guardian — visits Ovi Sr. in prison. Unwilling to pay the ransom or surrender his territories to Amir as it will hurt his prestige, Ovi Sr. orders Saju to retrieve his son, threatening to kill Saju's son if he is unwilling to do so.

Tyler Rake, a former Australian Army SASR operator turned mercenary, is recruited by his handler and fellow mercenary, Nik Khan, to save Ovi Jr. from Dhaka, Bangladesh, with Ovi Sr.'s men set to pay them once Ovi Jr. is recovered.

Tyler saves Ovi, kills his captors, and takes him to the extraction point. Asif orders the head of local police, Colonel Rashid, to initiate a lockdown of Dhaka, securing all bridges and travel points out of the city. Ovi Sr.'s men do not transfer the payment, as it is revealed that the authorities have frozen Ovi Sr.'s bank account; he had no means to pay the mercenaries in the first place, having tricked them into saving his son.

Saju kills Tyler's teammates and tries to kill Tyler, so he can take Ovi, and cheat the mercenaries out of their payment. Nik arranges for a helicopter to extract Tyler outside the city and tells him to abandon Ovi since the contract has been nullified. Tyler refuses, haunted by memories of his own deceased son, whom he abandoned after he could not stand seeing him suffer from lymphoma.

After escaping Saju the duo are hunted down by the corrupt Dhaka Metropolitan Police tactical units on Asif's payroll, and a gang of boys a part of Asif's organization, led by Farhad, a young criminal eager to impress Asif, Tyler calls his friend Gaspar, a retired American squad-mate living in Dhaka, for help. He and Ovi lay low at Gaspar's home for the evening.

Gaspar reveals Asif has placed a $10,000,000 bounty on Ovi Jr., which he offers to share if Tyler allows him to kill the boy. Tyler refuses and fights Gaspar, who gains the upper hand, but is shot and killed by Ovi. Tyler calls Saju, and they team up to save the boy and escape Dhaka.

Tyler draws attention away from Saju and Ovi as the two make their way past a bridge checkpoint. Nik and her mercenaries arrive at the bridge as Asif watches from afar. In the ensuing firefight, Saju is killed by Rashid, who is in turn killed by Nik. A heavily wounded Tyler is shot in the neck by Farhad before he can make it to Nik's helicopter. Seeing Ovi safe with Nik, Tyler falls into the river. (Note: Tyler Rake is shown to survive in Extraction 2 (2023).) Ovi, Nik, and the extraction team escape to Mumbai.

Eight months later, Nik ambushes Asif in a restroom and shoots him to death. Meanwhile, Ovi dives into his school's swimming pool to practice holding his breath, mirroring the scene where Tyler is introduced in the film. He surfaces to see a blurred vision of a man resembling Tyler watching him.

== Cast ==
- Chris Hemsworth as Tyler Rake, a former Australian SASR operator turned black ops mercenary
- Rudhraksh Jaiswal as Ovi Mahajan Jr., the son of Indian drug lord Ovi Mahajan Sr.
- Randeep Hooda as Saju Rav, a former Para (Special Forces) Lieutenant Colonel and the head of security of Ovi Sr.
- Golshifteh Farahani as Nik Khan, a mercenary and partner of Tyler
- Pankaj Tripathi as Ovi Mahajan Sr., the incarcerated Indian drug lord, and father of Ovi Jr.
- David Harbour as Gaspar, a former squad teammate of Tyler living in Dhaka and Asif's secret friend
- Bryon and Ryder Lerum as Tyler Rake's son
- Priyanshu Painyuli as Amir Asif, a Bangladeshi drug lord who kidnaps Ovi.
- Sudipto Balav as Sadik, a henchman of Amir Asif.
- Adam Bessa as Yaz Khan, the younger brother of Nik and a member of her crew.
- Shataf Figar as Colonel Rashid, a colonel of a Bangladeshi elite force working for Asif.
- Suraj Rikame as Farhad Goldberg, a young boy turned henchman of Asif.
- Neha Mahajan as Neysa Rav, Saju's wife.
- Sam Hargrave as Gaetan "G", a mercenary and partner of Tyler
- Wayne Blair as Koen

== Production ==
=== Development and casting ===
The film had a long development process. On March 5, 2012, it was revealed that Dwayne Johnson was attached to star in the film, originally titled Ciudad, with the Russo Brothers on board to direct from a screenplay by Joe Russo.

On August 31, 2018, it was announced that Sam Hargrave would direct Dhaka from a screenplay by Joe Russo. In addition, Chris Hemsworth was set to star in the film. In November 2018, the rest of the cast was set.

=== Filming ===
Production began in Ahmedabad and Mumbai in November 2018. Filming next took place in Ban Pong, Ratchaburi, Thailand.

The cast stayed in Nakhon Pathom. Principal production ended in March 2019. The film's working title was initially Dhaka but was changed to Out of the Fire, before the final title was revealed to be Extraction on February 19, 2020.

=== Music ===
Henry Jackman and Alex Belcher composed the film score and worked together in 21 Bridges while the Russo Brothers produced the film. BMG has released the soundtrack. English indie rock band Alt-J's "In Cold Blood" was used for the official trailer.

== Reception ==
=== Viewership ===
Extraction was the top-streamed item in its debut weekend, then fell to sixth place (but third among films) in its second week. Netflix estimated the film would be watched by about 90 million households during its first month of release, the biggest premiere in the service's history. The film returned to the site's top-10 during the 4th of July weekend. In July 2020, Netflix said the film had been watched by 99 million households in its first four weeks of release, the most-ever for one of their original films. In November, Variety reported the film was the fourth-most watched straight-to-streaming title of 2020 up to that point.

=== Critical response ===
On Rotten Tomatoes, the film has an approval rating of 67% based on 222 reviews, with an average rating of 6.2/10. The website's critics consensus reads: "Spectacular stunt work and an electric performance from Chris Hemsworth can't save Extraction from being dragged down by its aimless violence." On Metacritic, the film has a weighted average score of 56 out of 100, based on 35 critics, indicating "mixed or average" reviews.

Rohan Naahar of the Hindustan Times praised the performances of Hemsworth and Hooda, and wrote: "Featuring one of the most stunning action scenes in recent memory... [the film] is breakneck and bonkers." Entertainment Weekly's Leah Greenblatt gave the film a "B" and wrote that it "mostly delivers what its swaggering trailer promises: international scenery; insidious villains; a taciturn, tree-trunk Aussie."

Writing for Rolling Stone, Peter Travers gave the film 2 out of 5 stars and said: "Aiming for the fight poetry of the John Wick franchise, Extraction comes closer to a series of stunts strung together to look like an ultraviolent video game (think Manhunt 2) in which the avatars are played by actual humans."

Extraction was criticized by several outlets as having "white savior" elements. Variety called the film "a white-savior version of Man on Fire," while Screen Rant said that the film's "regressive white savior elements" drag it down. In an overall positive review, Scott Mendelson of Forbes wrote: "Look, let's get this out of the way. Yes, director Sam Hargrave and writer Joe Russo's Extraction... is an arguably 'problematic' white savior flick but it's also a solid action-adventure".

The Daily Star expressed concern over the representation of Dhaka, calling the representation "bleak and inaccurate, but Dhaka nonetheless". BBC Bangla also noted many complaints online about the portrayal of Dhaka and Bangladesh in the film.

=== Accolades ===
Marko Forker, Lynzi Grant, Craig Wentworth, and Olivier Sarda were nominated by the Visual Effects Society at the 19th Visual Effects Society Awards on April 6, 2021, in the category Outstanding Supporting Visual Effects in a Photoreal Feature.

== Sequel ==
In May 2020, it was reported Joe Russo had been hired to write a sequel to the film, with the intention of both Sam Hargrave and Chris Hemsworth returning. In December 2020, the Russo Brothers stated that beyond the sequel they hope to develop a series of films set within the world of Extraction to not only explore some of the characters that were introduced in the first film but to potentially launch a cinematic universe. In January 2021, it was rumored that the Russo brothers were also working on an origin story for Randeep Hooda's character Saju.

Principal photography began on December 4, 2021, in Prague, Czech Republic. Filming for the sequel was slated to begin in Sydney, Australia in September 2021, but measures related to the COVID-19 pandemic moved production to Prague. In September 2021, Netflix released a teaser trailer for Extraction 2, which revealed that Hemsworth will return as Tyler Rake.
