= David Weil (filmmaker) =

American writer, producer, and director

- Born: 1989 or 1990 (age 36–37)
- Occupations: Television screenwriter; producer; showrunner; director
- Years active: 2020–present

David Weil (born 1989/1990) is an American television writer, producer, director and showrunner. He created the Amazon Prime Video television series Hunters (2020–2023), and the Amazon anthology miniseries Solos (2021). He also co-created the series Invasion (2021–present) with Simon Kinberg for Apple TV+.

Weil grew up in Great Neck, New York. He is Jewish. He is also the grandson of Holocaust survivors.

== Filmography ==
Television

Year	Title	Director	Writer	Creator	Executive producer	Notes
2020–2023	Hunters	Yes	Yes	Yes	Yes	Wrote 9 episodes, directed "The Home"
2020	The Twilight Zone	No	Story	No	No	Episode "Ovation"
2021	Solos	Yes	Yes	Yes	Yes	Wrote 5 episodes, directed 3 episodes
2021–present	Invasion	No	Yes	Yes	Yes	Wrote 3 episodes
2023–present	Citadel	Yes	Yes	Yes	Yes	Wrote 10 episodes, directed "Heirlooms"
2024	Citadel: Diana	No	No	No	Yes	
2024	Citadel: Honey Bunny	No	No	No	Yes	

Film

Year	Title	Director	Writer	Producer
TBA	Tyrant	Yes	Yes	Yes
TBA	Extraction 3	No	Yes	No
TBA	Supermax	No	Yes	No
