= Chris Hemsworth =

Australian actor (born 1983)

Chris Hemsworth AM
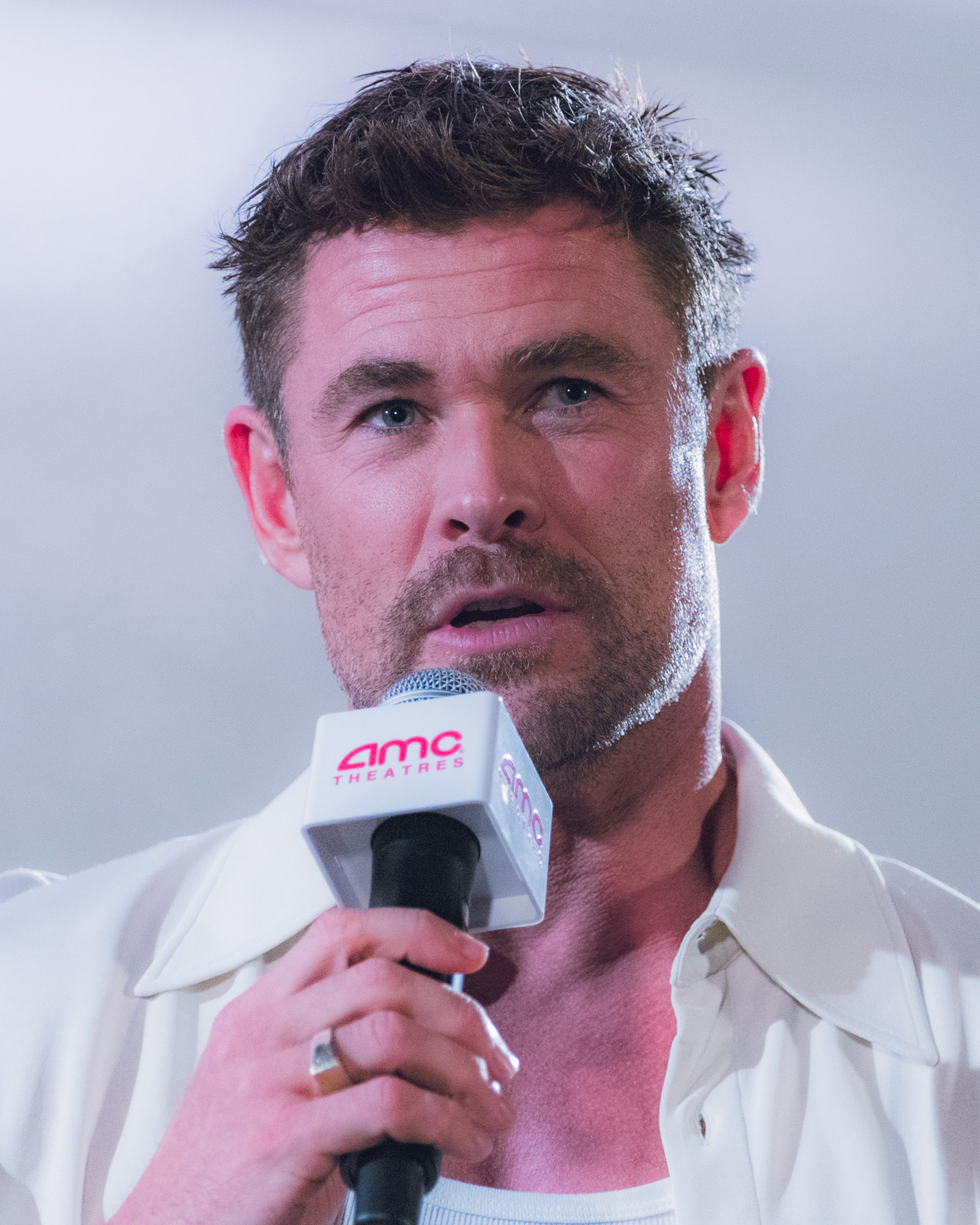
- Hemsworth in 2026
- Born: Christopher Hemsworth; 11 August 1983 (age 43); Melbourne, Victoria, Australia
- Education: Heathmont College
- Occupations: Actor; film producer
- Years active: 2002–present
- Spouse: Elsa Pataky (m. 2010)
- Children: 3, including India Rose Hemsworth
- Relatives: Luke Hemsworth (brother); Liam Hemsworth (brother); Joanne van Os (aunt)

Christopher Hemsworth (born 11 August 1983) is an Australian actor and film producer. His films as a leading man have grossed over $12.1 billion worldwide, making him one of the highest-grossing film stars of all time. Hemsworth was one of the world's highest-paid actors annually from 2017 to 2019.

Hemsworth's breakthrough came as Kim Hyde on the Australian soap opera Home and Away (2004–2007), before making his Hollywood film debut in Star Trek (2009). He achieved global recognition for portraying Thor in eleven films across the Marvel Cinematic Universe (MCU), beginning with his solo feature debut in 2011. He has since starred in other major-studio films such as Snow White and the Huntsman (2012), Ghostbusters (2016), Bad Times at the El Royale (2018), Men in Black: International (2019), Extraction (2020), and Furiosa: A Mad Max Saga (2024). He earned praise for his performance as Formula One driver James Hunt in the biographical sports film Rush (2013).

Hemsworth is a prominent advocate for brain health and was named by Time as one of the 100 most influential people in the world for health in 2026. Often labeled a sex symbol, he has been referred to as one of the world's most attractive men by various media outlets.

== Early life ==
Christopher Hemsworth was born on 11 August 1983 in Melbourne, to Leonie (née van Os), an English teacher, and Craig Hemsworth, a social-services counsellor. He has an older brother, Luke, and a younger brother, Liam; both of them also actors. His maternal grandfather is a Dutch immigrant and his maternal grandmother is of Irish descent; on his paternal line he is of English, Scottish, and German ancestry.

He was brought up both in Melbourne and in the Outback in Bulman, Northern Territory. He has said, "My earliest memories were on the cattle stations up in the Outback, and then we moved back to Melbourne and then back out there and then back again. Certainly most of my childhood was in Melbourne but probably my most vivid memories were up there [in Bulman] with crocodiles and buffalo. Very different walks of life." He attended high school at Heathmont College before his family again returned to the Northern Territory, and then moved a few years later to Phillip Island.

== Career ==
=== 2002–2010: Early work ===
Hemsworth started his career by appearing in several television series. In 2002, Hemsworth starred in three episodes of fantasy television series Guinevere Jones as King Arthur, as well as making an appearance in soap opera series Neighbours and one episode of Marshall Law. The following year, he appeared in an episode of The Saddle Club. In 2004, Hemsworth auditioned for the role of Robbie Hunter in Australian soap opera Home and Away. He did not receive the part, but was subsequently recalled for the part of Kim Hyde. He moved to Sydney to join the cast, appearing in 171 episodes of the series. He left the cast of Home and Away on 3 July 2007. Hemsworth later remarked that although he became more visible after Home and Away, his work on a soap opera did not earn him respect within the film industry.

Hemsworth was a contestant on the fifth season of Dancing with the Stars Australia, partnered with professional dancer Abbey Ross. The season premiered on 26 September 2006, and after six weeks, Hemsworth was eliminated on 7 November. Hemsworth's appearance in the franchise almost cost him the role of Thor, as producers of the Marvel film franchise feared fans would be put off.

In 2009, Hemsworth played James T. Kirk's father, George Kirk, in the opening scenes of J. J. Abrams' film Star Trek. The role was initially offered to Matt Damon, who turned it down; Abrams appreciated Hemsworth taking on the role. Josh Tyler of CinemaBlend was impressed with Hemsworth, describing the actor's scene as the "best five minutes I've spent in a movie theater this year." The film was a box office success, grossing US$385.7 million. That same year, Hemsworth played Kale Garrity in the thriller A Perfect Getaway. It received mixed reviews, but Hemsworth was praised for his "appropriately intimidating" performance of a "thuggish backpacker." Paul Young of Screen Rant also praised Hemsworth's performance as "solid."

Hemsworth went on to play Sam in 2010's Ca$h alongside English actor Sean Bean, which was the first film he shot when he arrived in the United States. The film's director, Stephen Milburn Anderson, said Hemsworth had only been in the United States for six weeks when he had auditioned for the role, recalling, "Here's a guy who is young, has the right look, is a very good actor and, let's face it, he's beautiful. So I say, we need to get this guy in. I was very impressed". In November 2010, The Hollywood Reporter named Hemsworth one of the young male actors who are "pushing – or being pushed" onto the Hollywood "A-List".

=== 2011–2015: Thor and worldwide recognition ===
In 2011, Sony Pictures announced that Hemsworth would star in the thriller Shadow Runner, but the film was never made. That same year, Hemsworth was cast as the superhero Thor in the Marvel Cinematic Universe. His first film in the franchise was 2011's Thor. He and castmate Tom Hiddleston, who ultimately played Loki, had each auditioned for the role, for which Hemsworth said he gained 20 pounds of muscle. With a worldwide gross of US$449.3 million, Thor was the 15th highest-grossing film of 2011. The film received positive reviews, and Hemsworth's portrayal of the God of Thunder was praised by Kenneth Turan of the Los Angeles Times. Hemsworth reprised the role the following year for the film The Avengers (2012) as one of the six superheroes—alongside Robert Downey Jr.'s Tony Stark / Iron Man, Chris Evans' Steve Rogers / Captain America, Mark Ruffalo's Bruce Banner / Hulk, Scarlett Johansson's Natasha Romanova / Black Widow, and Jeremy Renner's Clint Barton / Hawkeye—sent to defend Earth from his adopted brother, Loki. The film was a critical and commercial success, grossing over US$1.5 billion worldwide. The ensemble cast was praised for their onscreen chemistry by Peter Travers of Rolling Stone.

Hemsworth shot the horror film The Cabin in the Woods shortly after the release of Star Trek, but it went unreleased until 2012. It garnered positive reviews, and his portrayal of Alpha male jock Curt Vaughan was described by Alison Foreman of Mashable as his "sexiest" role yet. Hemsworth later starred opposite Kristen Stewart in the film Snow White and the Huntsman (2012) as the Huntsman. Although a commercial success, grossing US$396 million worldwide, it received mixed reviews. Critics were critical of Hemsworth and Stewart's onscreen chemistry, and Angela Watercutter of Wired felt the characters were "not fully fleshed-out." Hemsworth was cast as Jed Eckert in the 2012 Red Dawn remake after MGM saw dailies footage of a scene from The Cabin in the Woods; he was cast as Thor two days after being cast in Red Dawn. The film was a box-office bomb, grossing only US$50 million against a production budget of US$65 million, and received negative reviews.

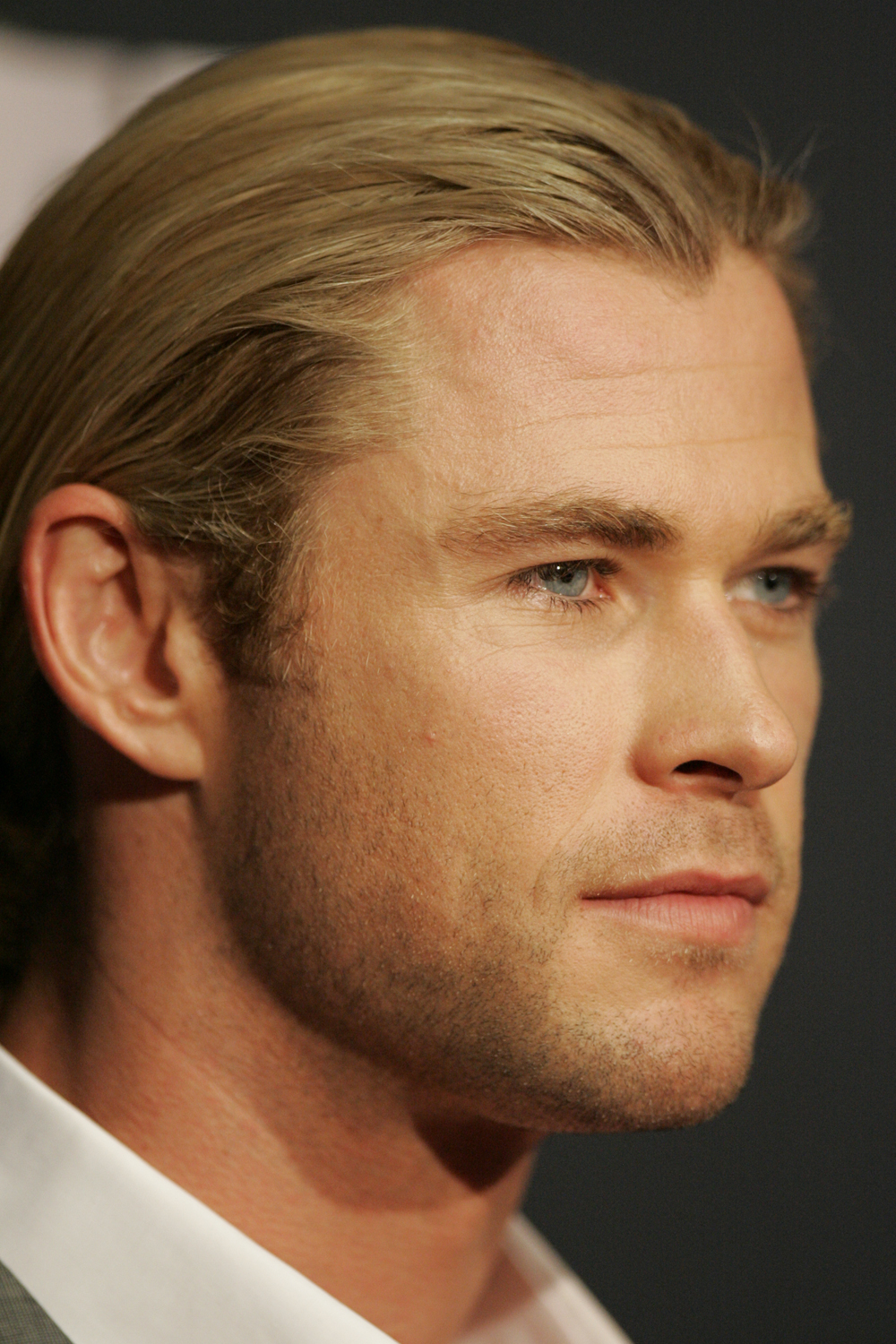
Hemsworth in 2013

In 2013, Hemsworth starred in Ron Howard's sports drama film Rush, as 1976 Formula 1 World Champion James Hunt. Henry Barnes of The Guardian was impressed with Hemsworth's performance, praising the actor for delivering the "superb script" with "some mastery." Later that year, Hemsworth reprised the role of Thor for the sequel to Thor in Thor: The Dark World (2013). Although a commercial success with a worldwide gross of US$644.6 million, the film became the lowest-rated film in the MCU franchise on the review aggregator website Rotten Tomatoes at 66% approval rating. The chemistry between Hemsworth and Hiddleston was praised by critics; Ben Child of The Guardian wrote, "Thanks to Hiddleston and Hemsworth's impressive collective charisma, Thor: The Dark World is far from a franchise killer."

In 2015, Hemsworth starred in director Michael Mann's action thriller Blackhat, opposite Viola Davis. The film bombed at the box office and was poorly received. For many critics, a significant issue of the film was the casting of Hemsworth as a hacker; Christy Lemire of the Chicago Sun-Times remarked, "Anyone who makes [their] way in the world sitting in front of a computer screen all day is not going to look as hunky as Hemsworth." Hemsworth himself later admitted to being displeased with his performance: "I didn't enjoy what I did in the film," he commented. "It just felt flat, and it was also an attempt to do what I thought people might have wanted to see. But I don't think I'm good in that space." He reprised his role as Thor for the fourth time in the sequel to The Avengers, Avengers: Age of Ultron. In addition to the film receiving positive reviews and grossing over US$1.4 billion worldwide, Hemsworth also won the People's Choice Awards for Favorite Action Movie Actor. Hemsworth returned to the set of Home and Away in November 2014 to film a scene as an extra and not as his character Kim Hyde. The episode which he appeared in was broadcast on 19 May 2015.

That same year, he co-starred in the comedy film Vacation, along with Ed Helms, a revival of the film series that originally starred Chevy Chase. He was nominated for the MTV Movie Awards for Best Kiss with Leslie Mann. His last 2015 film was In the Heart of the Sea, based on the book of the same name by Nathaniel Philbrick, with Hemsworth playing first mate Owen Chase. In an interview on Jimmy Kimmel Live!, he said that to prepare for the role of starving sailors, the cast was put on a diet of 500–600 calories a day to lose weight. In the Heart of the Sea received mixed reviews from critics, and was a box office disappointment, grossing US$93 million against a US$100 million budget, but Hemsworth received a nomination for Choice Movie Actor: Action at the 18th Teen Choice Awards.

=== 2016–present: Continued commercial success ===
In 2016, Hemsworth reprised the role of Eric the Huntsman in The Huntsman: Winter's War, alongside Jessica Chastain, who played his love interest. Writing for IndieWire, Oliver Lyttelton criticised the onscreen chemistry between Hemsworth and Chastain, stating that "they're both struggling uphill against accents they're palpably not comfortable with, displaying zero chemistry, and frankly appearing to be in different films." The film underperformed compared to its predecessor, grossing only US$165 million. Hemsworth later joined the cast of the reboot Ghostbusters film, playing Kevin the receptionist. The film disappointed critically and commercially, but Hemsworth was praised for "deliver[ing] the most fun" by Caroline Westbrook of Metro and won the Kids' Choice Awards for Favorite Movie Actor.

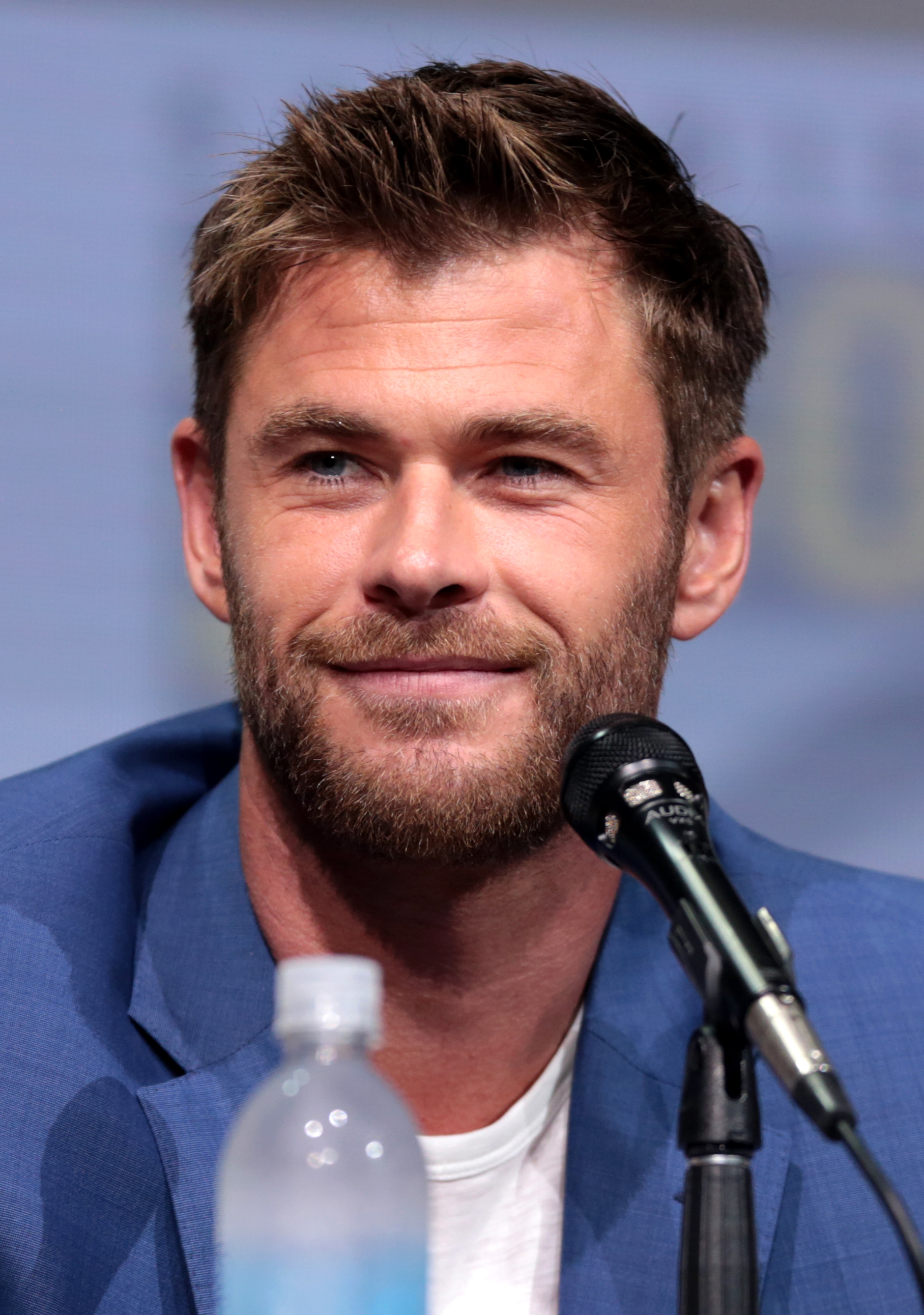
Hemsworth promoting Thor: Ragnarok at the 2017 San Diego Comic-Con

Hemsworth reprised his role as Thor in Thor: Ragnarok, released on 3 November 2017 in the U.S., and again in both the third and fourth Avengers films, Avengers: Infinity War and Avengers: Endgame in 2018 and 2019 respectively. All three films were a critical and commercial success. Matt Zoller Seitz of RogerEbert.com likened Hemsworth's acting to Cary Grant, stating that "Hemsworth's charisma holds [Thor: Ragnarok] together whenever it threatens to spin apart". Hemsworth won the Teen Choice Awards for Choice Sci-Fi Movie Actor. Meanwhile, in his review of Avengers: Endgame, Joe Morgenstern of The Wall Street Journal acknowledged "Hemsworth's Thor, endearing despite some ragged material and the actor's seemingly limited dramatic range" while praising Hemsworth in the MCU Infinity Saga finale "as the graceful, exuberant comic actor he was destined to be, while Thor morphs, alarmingly and charmingly—yet still heroically—into a beer-bellied apparition who could pass for Jeff Lebowski." In 2017, Hemsworth was the guest narrator at Disney's Candlelight Processional at Disneyland.

Hemsworth was to reprise his role as George Kirk in the fourth film of the rebooted Star Trek film series, but he left the project in August 2018 after contract negotiations fell through; Hemsworth later said he found the script underwhelming. In 2019, he also starred in a spin-off of the Men in Black series, titled Men in Black: International. The film grossed US$253 million worldwide and received generally unfavourable reviews from critics, who criticised the "lackluster action and forgettable plot," although the chemistry between Hemsworth and co-star Tessa Thompson was praised.

In 2020, Hemsworth starred in the Netflix action thriller Extraction, reuniting him with the Russo brothers, who served as producers. After being watched by 90 million households in its initial month of release, the film broke Netflix's viewership record previously held by Bird Box. Hemsworth reprised the role of Thor in the fourth film, Thor: Love and Thunder. Filming began in February 2021 in Australia, and it was released in 2022. Hemsworth commented on the film's response, stating: "I think we just had too much fun. It just became too silly. It's always hard being in the center of it and having any real perspective [...] you just don't know how people are going to respond." He later reflected on his own performance, believing he had become "a parody of [himself]" with the improv and "wackiness" of the film, and that he "didn't stick the landing".

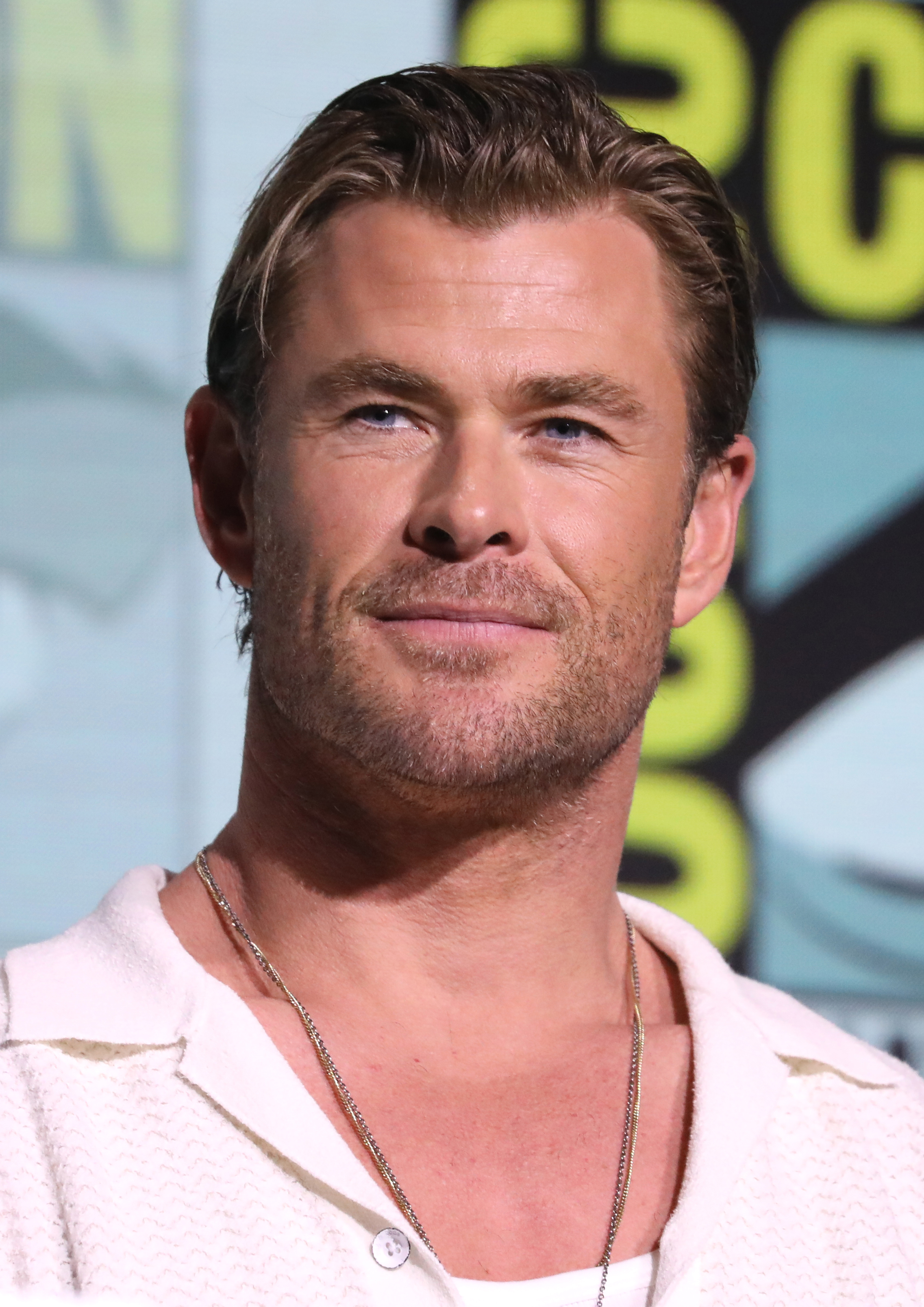
Hemsworth at the 2024 San Diego Comic-Con

Hemsworth worked on Limitless with Chris Hemsworth in 2022, a six-part documentary series, for National Geographic. The show paired Hemsworth with noted filmmaker Darren Aronofsky. The show has Hemsworth appearing in a variety of different ways that humans have sought to increase their health. The episodes saw Hemsworth take a plunge in icy Arctic water, fast for long periods of time, and participate in an indigenous Australian ceremony. The last of which resulted in some controversy for the show, as Indigenous groups claimed that filming at the sacred site was disrespectful to the culture. Hemsworth returned as Tyler Rake in Netflix's Extraction 2 (2023), which earned him $20 million.

Hemsworth starred in the Mad Max: Fury Road spin-off Furiosa: A Mad Max Saga, released in May 2024. The Washington Post wrote that he had "perhaps created one of the all-time-great screen villains" in his role as the warlord Dementus. Hemsworth voiced a young Optimus Prime in the Transformers prequel film Transformers One. In October 2024, Hemsworth entered talks to play the title character in Paul King's Prince Charming for Disney. Hemsworth featured in A Road Trip to Remember, a 2025 National Geographic documentary about his father's experience with Alzheimer's disease. In 2026, Hemsworth starred alongside Marvel co-star Mark Ruffalo in the crime thriller film Crime 101, for which he was also executive producer. Hemsworth will once again return as Thor in Avengers: Doomsday, scheduled for release in December 2026.

== Public image ==
After appearing as Thor in the MCU franchise, Hemsworth's physique gained attention from fans. His exercise routines have been regularly discussed in the media, including The Times of India, Men's Health, MensXP, Entertainment Tonight, and Metro. He later created the fitness app Centr, which provides paying customers access to nutrition, wellness, and exercise routines. In 2014, he was named the "Sexiest Man Alive" by People magazine. He is part of a group of Hollywood actors known as the "Hollywood Chrises", which also includes Chris's Evans, Pine, and Pratt.

Hemsworth is an avid supporter of the Western Bulldogs in the Australian Football League. He was the star of the AFL's 2014 Everything's Possible campaign, donating the fees for his involvement to the Australian Children Foundation. Hemsworth was also the star in the AFL's 2017 "I'd Like to See That" commercial.

=== Wealth ===
As his career in Hollywood films has developed, Hemsworth has become one of the world's highest-paid actors. He appeared in Forbes' World's Highest Paid Actors list in 2014, 2015, and 2018. Additionally, he ranked 31st in the magazine's list of Highest Paid Celebrities in 2018 and 24th in 2019 with estimated earnings of US$76.4 million.

=== Charity ===
In May 2020, Chris and his brother Liam were among the celebrities who read an installment of Roald Dahl's children's fantasy novel James and the Giant Peach in aid of the global-non profit charity Partners In Health, co-founded by Dahl's daughter Ophelia, which had been fighting COVID-19 in vulnerable areas. In October 2020, Hemsworth assisted in the reintroduction of Tasmanian devils to mainland Australia.

== Personal life ==
Hemsworth began dating Spanish model and actress Elsa Pataky in early 2010, after meeting through their mutual representatives. They married in December 2010. The couple have a daughter, India Rose, born in May 2012 and twin sons, born in March 2014. In 2015, the family moved from Los Angeles to Byron Bay, New South Wales, in his native Australia. Hemsworth speaks limited Spanish and Indonesian.

Hemsworth's children train Brazilian jiu-jitsu under Thalison Soares, and he has regularly taken them to compete in national tournaments.

Hemsworth was appointed a Member of the Order of Australia in the 2021 Queen's Birthday Honours.

In episode five of his National Geographic documentary Limitless (2022), Hemsworth revealed that his maternal grandfather suffered from Alzheimer's disease. It was also revealed that Hemsworth himself has inherited two high-risk variant copies of the APOE4 gene, one from his mother and one from his father, which makes it eight to ten times likelier for him to eventually develop Alzheimer's disease than the general population.

== Filmography ==
=== Film ===
Year	Title	Role	Notes	Ref.
2009	Star Trek	George Kirk		
2009	A Perfect Getaway	Kale Garrity		
2010	Ca$h	Sam Phelan		
2011	Thor	Thor		
2012	The Cabin in the Woods	Curt Vaughan		
2012	The Avengers	Thor		
2012	Snow White and the Huntsman	Eric the Huntsman		
2012	Red Dawn	Jed Eckert		
2013	Star Trek Into Darkness	George Kirk (voice)	Cameo	
2013	Rush	James Hunt		
2013	Thor: The Dark World	Thor		
2015	Blackhat	Nicholas Hathaway		
2015	Avengers: Age of Ultron	Thor		
2015	Vacation	Stone Crandall		
2015	In the Heart of the Sea	Owen Chase		
2016	The Huntsman: Winter's War	Eric the Huntsman		
2016	Ghostbusters	Kevin Beckman / Rowan North		
2016	Team Thor	Thor	Short film	
2016	Doctor Strange	Thor	Cameo; mid-credits scene	
2017	Team Thor: Part 2	Thor	Short film	
2017	Thor: Ragnarok	Thor		
2018	12 Strong	Captain Mitch Nelson		
2018	Avengers: Infinity War	Thor		
2018	Bad Times at the El Royale	Billy Lee		
2019	Avengers: Endgame	Thor		
2019	Men in Black: International	Henry / Agent H		
2019	Jay and Silent Bob Reboot	Himself	Cameo	
2020	Extraction	Tyler Rake	Also producer	
2022	Interceptor	TV salesman	Uncredited cameo and executive producer	
2022	Spiderhead	Steve Abnesti	Also producer	
2022	Thor: Love and Thunder	Thor	Also executive producer	
2023	Extraction 2	Tyler Rake	Also producer	
2024	Furiosa: A Mad Max Saga	Dementus		
2024	Deadpool & Wolverine	Thor	Repurposed archival footage from Thor: The Dark World	
2024	Transformers One	Orion Pax / Optimus Prime	Voice role	
2026	Crime 101	Mike Davis	Also producer	
2026	Avengers: Doomsday †	Thor	Post-production	
TBA	Stuntnuts: The Movie †	Himself	Post-production	
TBA	Subversion †	TBA	Post-production	
TBA	Kockroach †	TBA	Post-production	
TBA	Extraction 3 †	Tyler Rake	Filming; also producer	

Key
†	Denotes films that have not yet been released

=== Television ===
Year	Title	Role	Notes
2002	Guinevere Jones	King Arthur	3 episodes
2002	Neighbours	Jamie Kane	Season 18 (Episode #4069)
2002	Marshall Law	The Kid	Episode: "Domestic Bliss"
2003	The Saddle Club	The New Vet	Episode: "Tenderfoot"
2004	Fergus McPhail	Craig	Episode: "In a Jam"
2004–2007	Home and Away	Kim Hyde	Seasons 17–20 (189 episodes)
2006	Dancing with the Stars	Himself	5th place
2015	Saturday Night Live	Host	2 episodes
2021	Loki	Throg (voice)	Episode: "Journey into Mystery"; uncredited
2021	Shark Beach with Chris Hemsworth	Himself	Television special
2021–2024	What If...?	Thor (voice)	6 episodes
2022	Marvel Studios: Assembled	Himself	Episode: "The Making of Thor: Love and Thunder"
2022	Limitless with Chris Hemsworth	Himself	Also executive producer
2025	Chris Hemsworth: A Road Trip to Remember	Himself	Television special; Also executive producer

=== Video games ===
Year	Title	Role	Notes
2011	Thor: God of Thunder	Thor	Voice
2015	Lego Dimensions	Kevin Beckman	Voice
2016	Ghostbusters	Kevin Beckman	Voice

== Accolades ==
Year	Association	Category	Nominated work	Result
2005	Logie Awards	Most Popular Actor	Home and Away	Nominated
2006	Logie Awards	Most Popular Actor	Home and Away	Nominated
2008	Digital Spy Reader Awards	Best Exit	Home and Away	Nominated
2011	Teen Choice Awards	Choice Movie: Breakout Male	Thor	Nominated
2012	British Academy Film Awards	Rising Star Award	Thor	Nominated
2012	People's Choice Awards	Favorite Movie Superhero	Thor	Nominated
2012	MTV Movie Awards	Best Hero	Thor	Nominated
2012	Teen Choice Awards	Choice Movie Actor: Sci-Fi/Fantasy	The Avengers	Nominated
2012	Teen Choice Awards	Choice Summer Movie Star: Male	The Avengers & Snow White and the Huntsman	Won
2013	People's Choice Awards	Favorite Movie Superhero	The Avengers	Nominated
2013	People's Choice Awards	Favorite On-Screen Chemistry (shared with Kristen Stewart)	Snow White and the Huntsman	Nominated
2013	People's Choice Awards	Favorite Action Movie Star	The Avengers & Snow White and the Huntsman	Won
2013	Kids' Choice Awards	Favorite Male Buttkicker	The Avengers	Nominated
2013	MTV Movie Awards	Best Fight	The Avengers	Won
2013	Teen Choice Awards	Choice Movie Actor: Action	Red Dawn	Nominated
2014	Teen Choice Awards	Choice Movie Actor: Sci-Fi/Fantasy	Thor: The Dark World	Nominated
2015	Teen Choice Awards	Choice Movie Actor: Sci-Fi/Fantasy	Thor: The Dark World	Nominated
2015	Choice Movie Actor: Drama	Blackhat		Nominated
2016	People's Choice Awards	Favorite Action Movie Actor	Avengers: Age of Ultron & In the Heart of the Sea	Won
2016	Kids' Choice Awards	Favorite Movie Actor	Avengers: Age of Ultron	Nominated
2016	MTV Movie Awards	Best Kiss (shared with Leslie Mann)	Vacation	Nominated
2016	Teen Choice Awards	Choice Movie Actor: Action	In the Heart of the Sea	Nominated
2016	Teen Choice Awards	Choice Movie Actor: Sci-Fi/Fantasy	The Huntsman: Winter's War	Nominated
2016	Teen Choice Awards	Choice Movie: Liplock (shared with Jessica Chastain)	The Huntsman: Winter's War	Nominated
2016	Teen Choice Awards	Choice Summer Movie Star: Male	Ghostbusters	Nominated
2017	People's Choice Awards	Favorite Comedic Movie Actor	Ghostbusters	Nominated
2017	Kids' Choice Awards	Favorite Movie Actor	Ghostbusters	Won
2017	Kids' Choice Awards	Favorite Butt-Kicker	The Huntsman: Winter's War	Nominated
2018	Critics' Choice Awards	Best Actor in a Comedy	Thor: Ragnarok	Nominated
2018	MTV Movie Awards	Best Fight	Thor: Ragnarok	Nominated
2018	People's Choice Awards	The Action Movie Star of 2018	Avengers: Infinity War	Nominated
2018	People's Choice Awards	The Male Movie Star of 2018	Avengers: Infinity War	Nominated
2018	People's Choice Awards	The Drama Movie Star of 2018	12 Strong	Nominated
2020	People's Choice Awards	The Action Movie Star 2020	Extraction	Won
2020	People's Choice Awards	The Male Movie Star of 2020	Extraction	Nominated
2021	Critics' Choice Super Awards	Best Actor in an Action Movie	Extraction	Nominated
2023	Kids' Choice Awards	Favorite Movie Actor	Thor: Love and Thunder	Nominated
2024	Astra Midseason Movie Awards	Best Supporting Actor	Furiosa: A Mad Max Saga	Nominated
2024	Seattle Film Critics Society Awards	Best Supporting Actor	Furiosa: A Mad Max Saga	Nominated
2025	AACTA Awards	Best Supporting Actor	Furiosa: A Mad Max Saga	Nominated
2025	Kansas City Film Critics Circle	Best Supporting Actor	Furiosa: A Mad Max Saga	Nominated
2025	Kids' Choice Awards	Favorite Male Voice from an Animated Movie	Transformers One	Nominated

== See also ==
- List of Australian film actors
