= Ande Parks =

American professional comic book artist (born 1964)

- Parks at Dragon Con in 2026
- Born: October 1, 1964 (age 61); Emporia, Kansas
- Occupations: Author, Inker, Screenwriter
- Children: 2
- Website: andeparks.com

Ande Parks (born October 1, 1964) is an American professional comic book artist, known for his work as an inker and writer in the industry. His best known work has come from his stint with fellow artist Phil Hester on DC Comics' Green Arrow series from 2001 to 2004, and a story writer to the movie, Extraction (based on his graphic novel, Ciudad). In addition to Ciudad, Ande has written the graphic novels Union Station and Capote in Kansas by Oni Press. He grew up in the suburbs of Kansas City and lives in Baldwin City, Kansas with his wife and two children.

== Career ==
Parks began his professional career as an inker in comic books with Dark Horse Comics. He has inked the penciled artwork of such titles as Wonder Woman, Catwoman, Superman, Daredevil and Spider-Man. His artistic style has won him praise in the comic books industry, including an industry Harvey nomination as best inker. His idols and influences include Neal Adams, Frank Miller, Jack Kirby, and Dick Giordano. Parks has stated in at least one on-line interview that he inks with Hunt 102 and Brause 511 pens and a Raphael #3 brush. For characters from the comic books, Parks has acknowledged he has most enjoyed Batman and Captain America as his favorite characters.

=== Comics ===
Ande is probably best known for his work on the relaunched Green Arrow comic book series beginning in 2001, which he inked over his frequent collaborator Phil Hester. On Green Arrow, Hester and Parks worked with writers Kevin Smith, Brad Meltzer, and Judd Winick over their approximate 40-issue run. The book has been collected into several volumes. The American Library Association called it one of the best books for young adults. Parks and Hester have also done work on DC Comics' Nightwing with writer Devin Grayson, allowing Parks to work within the Batman family of characters, and the new revamped Ant-Man comic book for Marvel Comics in 2006–2007.

Continuing on with the Marvel Universe of characters, Parks co-plotted with Ed Brubaker and wrote "Blood of the Tarantula" for a Daredevil (Marvel Comics series) one-shot in the spring of 2008. The book was illustrated by Chris Samnee. Also in 2008 he was teamed with writer Jai Nitz and penciller Phil Hester for a 6-part mini-series on the DC Comics western character El Diablo.

He has worked as a writer on the Kato (The Green Hornet) comic book for the Dynamite Entertainment publishing company based on the Green Hornet's sidekick. More recently Parks has written books for Dynamite involving the characters Zorro and the Lone Ranger. He also wrote the Lone Ranger comic book for Dynamite for several months.

=== Graphic novel writer ===
Although better known for his artwork, Ande is also a writer. He has contributed several articles in comic book trade magazines, such as Draw!, geared towards critiques of artwork and professional tips for inkers. Parks' combined his inking style with his fondness for writing when he created the superhero spoof Uncle Slam & Fire Dog for Action Planet Comics, based to a certain extent on his love of Marvel Comics' Captain America. Uncle Slam appeared in three issues of the Action Planet anthology book series, and in two issues of his own book in the early- to mid-1990s. The character also appeared in a completely on-line comic book for Komicwerks. A new Uncle Slam book, "Uncle Slam Fights Back", was released in the summer of 2008.

For graphic novels, he has often turned to his neighboring region in the Midwest as source material for his writing projects. To date Parks has steered towards writing what is best classified as historical fiction. He has credited Alan Moore's From Hell as being a large influence in his decision to pursue writing in the historical fiction genre. In 2003, Oni Press published Park's first original graphic novel, Union Station. The book dealt with the events surrounding the Kansas City massacre, which took place in 1933 in Kansas City, Missouri, and helped J. Edgar Hoover make the F.B.I. a powerful organization in law enforcement and government for decades to come. Eduardo Barreto provided the artwork, done in black-&-white to give the piece more of a Depression-era period look.

In 2005 Parks returned to the genre of historical fiction with Capote In Kansas, drawn by Chris Samnee. The book details the time Truman Capote spent in Kansas while he worked on his literary masterpiece, In Cold Blood.

Parks wrote the graphic novel Ciudad which was published in 2014. The film Extraction (2020) is based on Ciudad.

=== Graphic novels ===
Title	Publication date	Featuring	Also featuring
Union Station	2003	J Edgar Hoover	Frank Nash, Charles Thomas
Capote in Kansas	2013	Truman Capote	
Ciudad/Extraction	2014	Tyler Rake	

== Website ==
In addition to his active official website where artwork is available for purchase, Ande maintains a blog at Ande Parks: Shouting from the Basement.
