= Sam Hargrave =

American stuntman

- Occupations: Director; stunt coordinator; stuntman; actor
- Years active: 2003–present

Sam Hargrave is an American stunt coordinator, stuntman, actor, and director. He is best known for his collaborations with the Russo brothers, including as the stunt coordinator for several films in the Marvel Cinematic Universe. The pair also wrote and produced Hargrave's directorial debut, Extraction (2020). Hargrave also served as Second Unit Director for season two of The Mandalorian.

== Filmography ==
=== Short film ===
- Reign (2007)
- Seven Layer Dip (2010, co-director)
- Love and Vigilance (2012, co-director)
- Game Changer (2013)
- The Shoot (2019)
- The Calm (2023)
- Pubg Ground of Honor: Rondo (2023)

=== Feature film ===
- Extraction (2020)
- Extraction 2 (2023)
- Matchbox: The Movie (2026)
- Extraction 3 (TBA)

=== Actor ===
Year	Title	Role
2003	The Pink House	Punk at Painting
2006	Safe	Guard #1
2006	Superman Unplugged	Superman / Clark Kent
2006	Crooked	Fighter
2006	Driving to Zigzigland	Cage Fighter #1
2007	T.K.O.	Nicolas
2009	Angel of Death	Chip
2009	Blood and Bone	Manuel
2010	Once Fallen	Axel
2010	Acts of Violence	Peter
2010	The King of Fighters	Mr.Big
2010	Seven Layer Dip	Sam
2011	Shtarkers	Thug 2
2011	Conan the Barbarian	Pict #1 / Horse Warrior
2011	Fatal	Shawn
2012	Shtarkers: Tough Guys	
2012	Love and Vigilance	
2014	Bad Choice	The Guy
2014	Blood Runs Black	Police Oiffcer
2015	Unlucky Stars	Sam
2017	Atomic Blonde	James Gascoigne
2017	The Saint	Security Guard #1
2019	Avengers: Endgame	New Asgard Truck Driver
2019	The Shoot	Seductive Spy
2020	Birds of Prey	Mercenary
2020	Extraction	Gaetan/"G"
2023	Extraction 2	Ditchdigger
2026	Matchbox: The Movie	Crew Chief Grizz

=== Stunt coordinator ===
- Mad Cowgirl (2006)
- Dexter (2006)
- T.K.O. (2007)
- Reign (2007)
- The P.A. (2008)
- The Truth Is Underrated (2008)
- Trust Me (2009)
- Once Fallen (2010)
- Acts of Violence (2010)
- Conan the Barbarian (2011)
- Trespass (2011)
- The Cyclist (2012)
- Jackman (2012)
- Love and Vigilance (2012)
- The Host (2013)
- Game Changer (2013)
- The Hunger Games: Catching Fire (2013)
- The Hunger Games: Mockingjay - Part 1 (2014)
- The Hunger Games: Mockingjay - Part 2 (2015)
- Captain America: Civil War (2016)
- The Accountant (2016)
- Suicide Squad (2016)
- Atomic Blonde (2017)
- Wolf Warrior 2 (2017)
- Avengers: Infinity War (2018)
- Deadpool 2 (2018)
- Avengers: Endgame (2019)

=== Second unit director ===
Year	Title	Director	Notes
2016	The Accountant	Gavin O'Connor	
2016	Suicide Squad	David Ayer	Additional photography, uncredited
2017	Atomic Blonde	David Leitch	
2018	Avengers: Infinity War	Anthony and Joe Russo	
2018	Deadpool 2	David Leitch	Additional photography
2019	Avengers: Endgame	Anthony and Joe Russo	
2020	The Mandalorian	Various	Disney + show, 7 episodes
