= Russo brothers =

American filmmakers

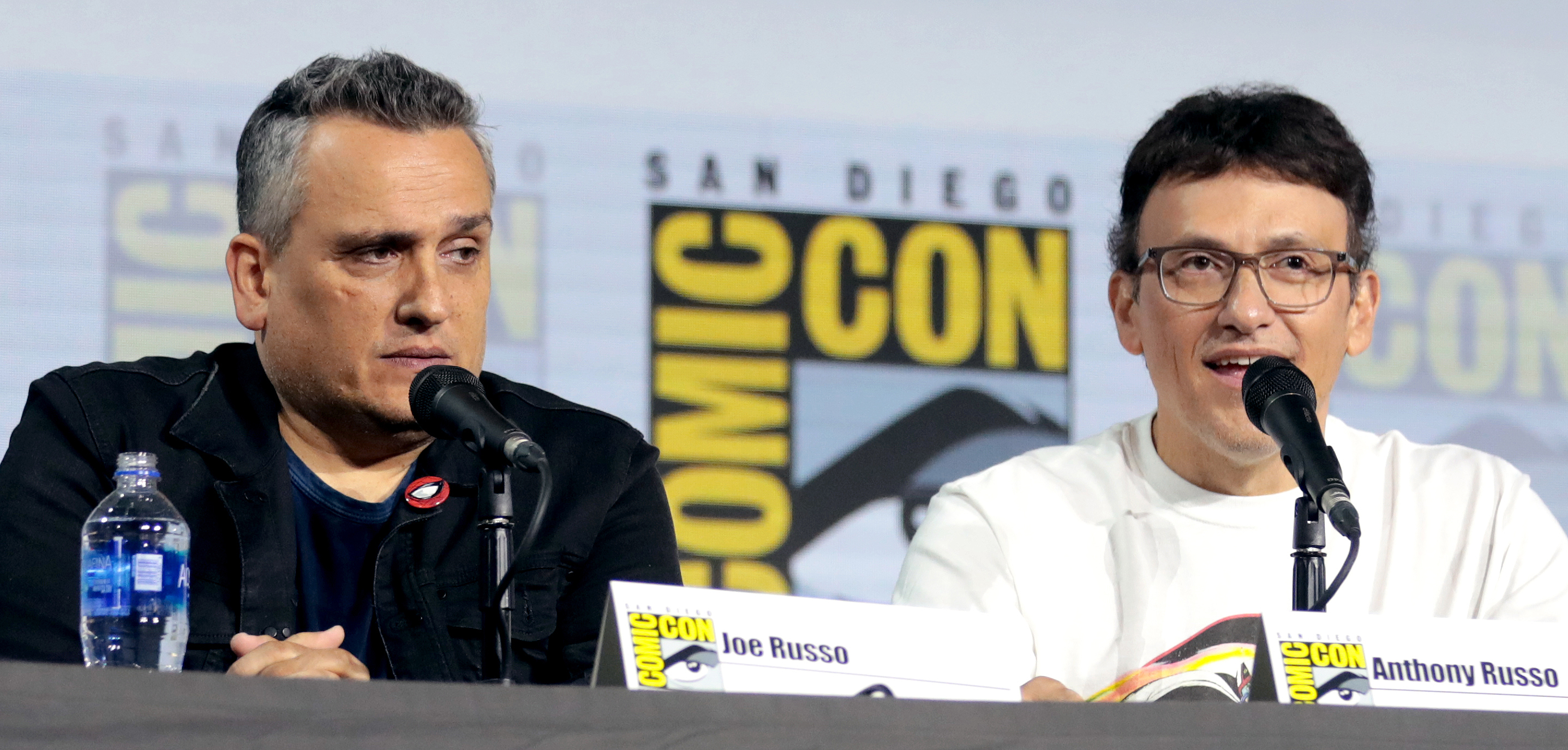
- Joe (left) and Anthony Russo in 2019
- Born: Anthony J. Russo; February 3, 1970 (age 56); Cleveland, Ohio, U.S. Joseph Vincent Russo; July 18, 1971 (age 55); Cleveland, Ohio, U.S.
- Education: Anthony: Columbia University, University of Pennsylvania; Joe: University of California, Los Angeles, University of Iowa; Both: Case Western Reserve University
- Occupations: Directors; producers; screenwriters; actors
- Years active: 1997–present
- Father: Basil Russo
- Relatives: Angela Russo-Otstot (sister)

Anthony J. Russo (born February 3, 1970) and Joseph Vincent Russo (born July 18, 1971), collectively known as the Russo brothers (/ˈruːsoʊ/ ROO-soh), are American filmmakers. They are best known for directing four films in the Marvel Cinematic Universe (MCU): Captain America: The Winter Soldier (2014), Captain America: Civil War (2016), Avengers: Infinity War (2018), and Avengers: Endgame (2019). The pair are the fourth-highest-grossing directors of all time, with Endgame grossing over $2.937 billion worldwide and becoming the highest-grossing film of all time.

Prior to their Marvel work, the brothers directed and produced the comedy series Arrested Development (2003–2005), Community (2009–2014), and Happy Endings (2011–2012), winning a Primetime Emmy Award for Arrested Development. The brothers co-founded the independent film studio AGBO, which produced their Netflix directorial projects The Gray Man (2022) and The Electric State (2025). They also directed Cherry (2021), and have produced several films through AGBO, including Extraction (2020) and Everything Everywhere All at Once (2022), the latter of which won seven Academy Awards, including Best Picture.

The brothers are currently directing the next two Avengers installments, Avengers: Doomsday (2026) and Avengers: Secret Wars (2027).

== Early life and education ==
Anthony J. Russo (born February 3, 1970) and Joseph Vincent Russo (born July 18, 1971) were born to Patricia Gallupoli and attorney and judge Basil Russo in Cleveland, Ohio. Both of their parents are of Italian descent, with families emigrating from Sicily and Abruzzo, respectively. After settling in Ohio, they raised Anthony and Joe, both of whom attended Benedictine High School.

After high school, Joe attended the University of Iowa, where he majored in English and writing and graduated in 1992 with a bachelor's degree in English. He became interested in acting after a professor encouraged him to write and perform a monologue for his class. Anthony attended the University of Pennsylvania, where he also majored in English.

== Career ==
=== Indie filmmaking ===
The Russo brothers wrote, directed, and produced their first feature film, Pieces, which they self-financed via student loans and credit cards. In an interview with Deadline, Anthony Russo said, "We were both in Cleveland and Robert Rodriguez had just made El Mariachi, and that inspired us. We were film buffs growing up, and his experience inspired us to make our own credit card film."

Pieces debuted at the Slamdance Film Festival and caught the attention of director Steven Soderbergh, who described the film as "insanely ambitious and dense... I was just very activated by how activated they were and it was clear they were grinders." Soderbergh reached out to the Russo brothers and, over a lunch meeting, offered to produce their next feature, Welcome to Collinwood, a caper comedy starring William H. Macy, Isaiah Washington, and Sam Rockwell. The Russo brothers were part of the Directors' Fortnight lineup for the 2002 Cannes Film Festival, where Welcome to Collinwood was one of the few U.S. entries and closed the fest.

=== Television breakthrough ===
After their sophomore film, FX Networks executive Kevin Reilly hired the brothers to direct the pilot for the series Lucky, having liked the pair's work on Welcome to Collinwood. They were also hand-picked by director and producer Ron Howard to direct the pilot for Fox's Arrested Development. The Russos suggested and fought to cast Jason Bateman for the lead role of Michael Bluth, despite studio skepticism toward Bateman.

In an interview with /Film, producer Dan Harmon, who hired the Russos to direct the pilot of his TV series Community, praised the Russos' ability to spot talent and cast based on character regardless of status in the industry. He credits the Russo brothers with the idea to cast Donald Glover on the NBC sitcom, calling the brothers "geniuses in casting." The brothers directed 34 episodes of Community, including A Fistful of Paintballs" and "For a Few Paintballs More," which served as the season two finale and received critical acclaim. Alan Sepinwall of Uproxx described the Russo brothers' installment as "nothing short of The Godfather Part II of sitcom episodes".

=== Marvel Cinematic Universe ===
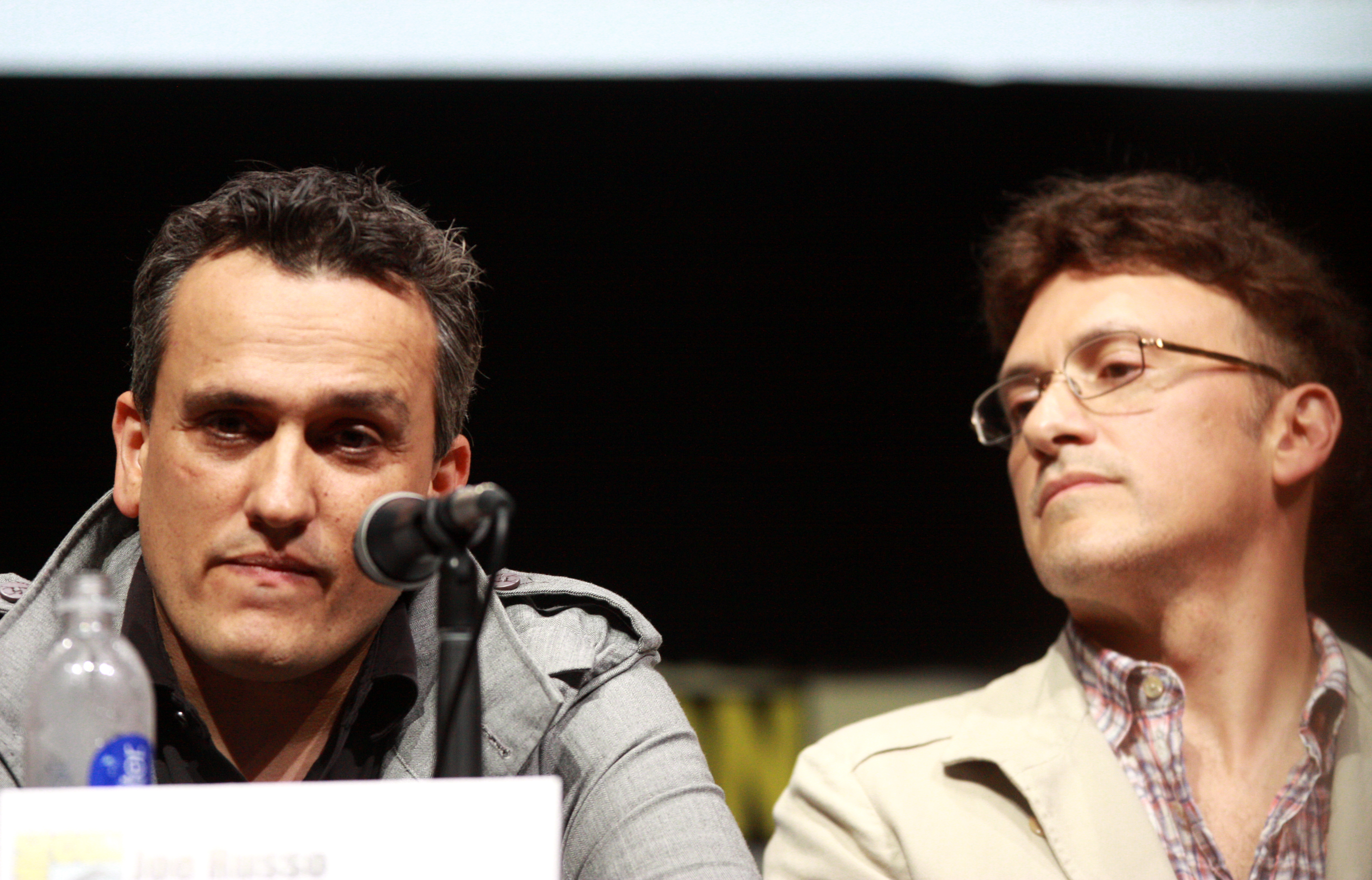
The Russos in 2013.

Their success with Arrested Development and Community put the Russo brothers on the radar of Marvel Studios president Kevin Feige, who brought them into the Marvel Cinematic Universe. In 2014, the Russo brothers directed their first film for Marvel Studios, the action espionage thriller Captain America: The Winter Soldier starring Chris Evans as Captain America. The brothers were in the running against nine other directors to helm the film, which was the sequel to Captain America: The First Avenger (2011), directed by Joe Johnston.

In an interview with The Hollywood Reporter, Joe Russo explained that they were given the script and "fell in love" with the movie, creating storyboards, rewriting scenes, and presenting an animatic to Marvel to get the job. The brothers noted The French Connection, Black Friday, Three Days of the Condor and All the President's Men as their influences in tone and style. The movie was a box office success and received critical acclaim, with Owen Gleiberman of Entertainment Weekly praising its tackling of serious subject matter and comparing it favorably to The Dark Knight (2008). The film was a financial success earning $714 million worldwide.

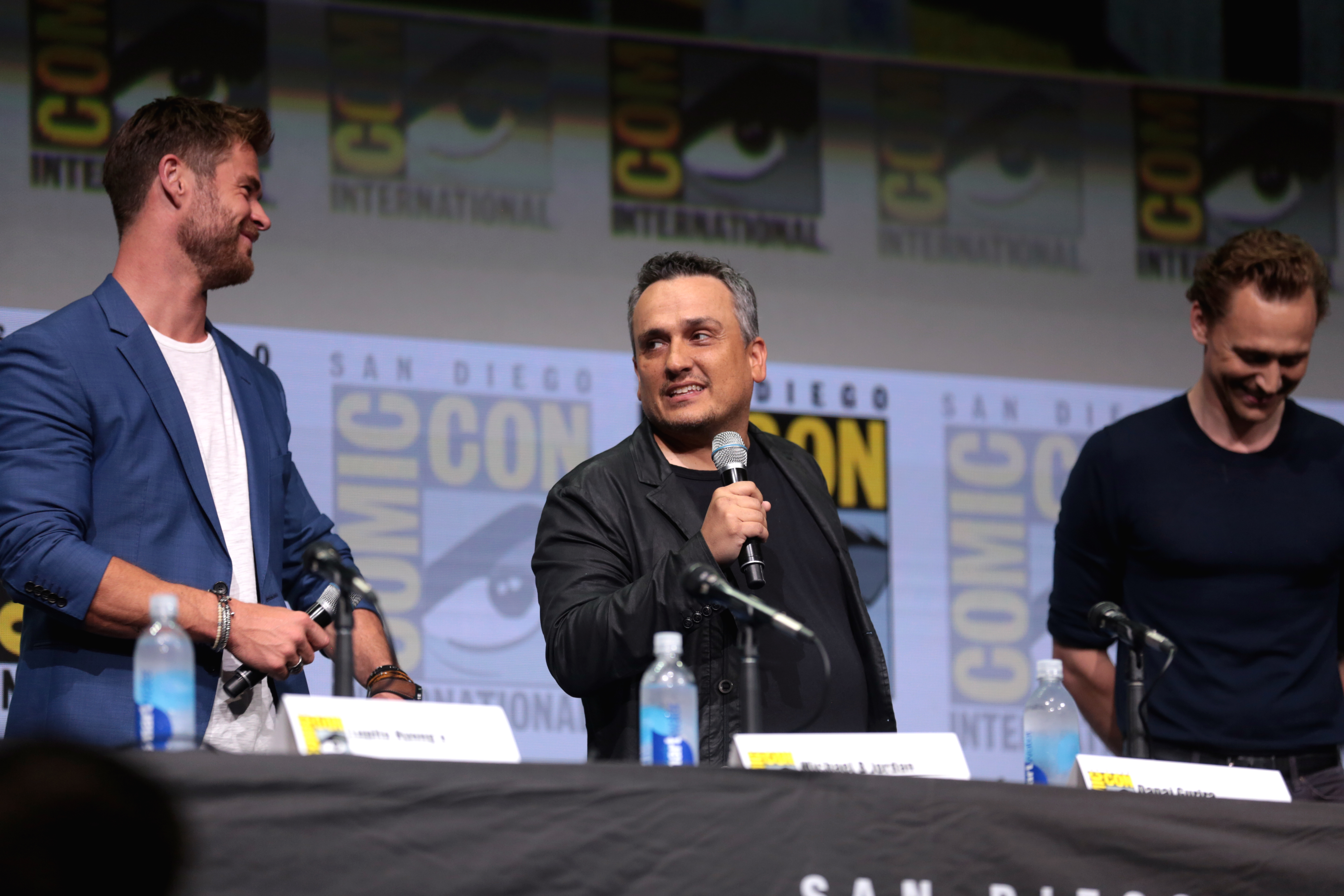
Joe Russo (center) with Chris Hemsworth (left) and Tom Hiddleston (right) in 2017.

The Russo brothers returned to the MCU with Captain America: Civil War (2016), the success of which got them hired on their highest profile projects to date: Avengers: Infinity War (2018) and Avengers: Endgame (2019). Infinity War would become the first superhero movie to gross over $2 billion at the box office. Endgame was the second superhero movie to surpass that same target, earning $2.799 billion in global box office. After breaking numerous box office records, the Russo brothers joined James Cameron as the only directors to make two films that each earned over $2 billion.

=== AGBO, criticisms, and return to Marvel ===
In 2017, the Russo brothers founded their production company, AGBO with producing partner Mike Larocca. The following year, the brothers' longtime Marvel film collaborators Christopher Markus and Stephen McFeely joined AGBO as Co-Presidents of Story. The brothers made it a part of AGBO's mission to "support emerging talent and foster their creativity," saying they wanted to pay forward the kind of mentorship that Steven Soderbergh had given them by supporting the directorial efforts of emerging creative voices. Feature directorial debuts supported by AGBO and produced by the Russo brothers include Mosul (2019) by writer Matthew Michael Carnahan and Relic (2020) by director Natalie Erika James.

Another first-time filmmaker supported by the Russo brothers via AGBO was their long-time collaborator, Sam Hargrave, who directed Extraction (2020), starring Chris Hemsworth. Joe Russo adapted the film from Ciudad, a graphic novel he wrote with his brother and Ande Parks. Extraction went on to be the most-watched original film in Netflix's history. This film would spawn a sequel, Extraction 2 (2023), which Joe Russo also wrote. A third installment was announced in 2023, and is set to begin production in 2025. The Netflix series Mercenary: An Extraction Series began filming in Ireland and Morocco in December 2025.

In 2019, the Russo brothers reunited with Marvel alumnus Chadwick Boseman when they produced the action-thriller 21 Bridges. The brothers had approached Boseman about the film at the premiere of Infinity War. Around this time, the Russo brothers also executive produced AGBO's first documentary series, Larry Charles' Dangerous World of Comedy.

After the release of Avengers: Infinity War and Avengers: Endgame, the Russo brothers made a creative pivot to drama, directing the Apple TV+ film Cherry (2021), which was co-written by their sister, Angela Russo-Otstot. The film explores the opioid epidemic through the lens of a war veteran with PTSD played by Tom Holland. Anthony Russo said the film was personal for the brothers, as they have family members who have suffered and died from opioid addiction. The Russo brothers then turned their focus back to blockbuster action by directing the Netflix's The Gray Man (2022) starring Chris Evans, Ryan Gosling and Ana de Armas. Both Cherry and The Gray Man received negative reviews from critics.

The Russo brothers produced the film Everything Everywhere All At Once (2022), written and directed by Daniel Kwan and Daniel Scheinert; it became A24's highest-grossing film worldwide at the box office and won seven Academy Awards, including Best Original Screenplay, Best Director, and Best Picture.

In 2022, they executive produced Captive Audience: A Real American Horror Story, which earned record-breaking viewership for Hulu, and the science fiction horror series From. The following year they produced the series Citadel for Amazon, starring Richard Madden, Priyanka Chopra Jonas, and Stanley Tucci. Citadel received negative reviews, with much criticism directed toward its $300 million budget. Despite this, the series has been renewed for a second season, which was directed entirely by Joe Russo and is set to premiere in 2026.

The brothers reunited with Netflix in March 2025 for the science-fiction action film The Electric State (2025) starring Millie Bobby Brown and Chris Pratt and based upon Simon Stålenhag's original graphic novel. The film received extremely negative reviews from critics, earning a 14% score on Rotten Tomatoes. Critic Lindsey Bahr of The Associated Press wrote of The Electric State, "it's lacking a spark and a soul that might distinguish it as memorable or special. Worse, considering everything it has going for it, The Electric State is kind of dull." In a review of The Electric State, New York Post's Johnny Oleksinski noted that the Russo brothers' directing efforts after Avengers: Endgame were "some of the worst and priciest movies of the past six years"; he panned this particular film's lack of originality. Despite this critical reception, the film debuted on Netflix as #1 in the platform's Top 10 upon its week of release.

At San Diego Comic-Con in July 2024, Marvel Studios announced that the Russo brothers would return to direct Avengers: Doomsday (2026) and Avengers: Secret Wars (2027), and that AGBO would be co-producing the films. Filming began in late 2024.

On March 1, 2024, it was announced that the Russo brothers would produce the swashbuckler action film The Bluff, directed by Frank E. Flowers and starring Priyanka Chopra, for Amazon MGM Studios. On February 5, 2025, it was reported that the brothers would produce the upcoming crime thriller The Whisper Man, directed by James Ashcroft, starring Robert De Niro, and based on the novel of the same name, for Netflix.

== Unreleased projects ==
=== Ghostbusters spin-off ===
In 2015, it was announced that the Russo brothers would direct a Ghostbusters spin-off film based on a pitch by them, Channing Tatum, and Reid Carolin. Tatum was intended to star with Chris Pratt being considered for a co-leading role. Drew Pearce would write the screenplay while original Ghostbusters director Ivan Reitman was intended to produce. It was originally set to be developed simultaneously alongside Paul Feig's 2016 reboot. The Russo brothers departed the project a year later due to commitments to Avengers: Infinity War.

=== MGM franchise reboots ===
In April 2019, it was announced that AGBO and MGM made a deal to develop remakes and reboots of films owned by MGM with the Russo brothers acting as "spiritual creative architects." It was reported that the Russos would develop and potentially direct reboots of Poltergeist, The Pink Panther, The Thomas Crown Affair, and The Secret of NIMH.

=== Live-Action Battle of the Planets film ===
In 2019, the Russo brothers announced that they would produce and potentially direct a live-action film adaptation of the science fiction anime series Battle of the Planets. In 2021, screenwriter Daniel Casey was hired to write the script. The film remains in development as of 2022.

=== Untitled Star Wars film ===
In 2019, it was reported that Kevin Feige was developing a standalone Star Wars film. Michael Waldron was set to write the screenplay as part of a first-look deal with Disney. In 2023, the Russo brothers confirmed they had early talks to helm the project before it was shelved that same year.

=== Untitled experimental musical ===
While promoting The Gray Man in 2022, the Russo brothers expressed interest in directing an experimental musical film. They talked to multiple artists about such a project, including The Weeknd, with Joe Russo citing his 2021 Super Bowl halftime show as a source of inspiration.

== Recurring collaborators ==
Throughout the brothers' careers in television and film, they have consistently collaborated with many of the same actors and filmmakers. Their most prolific creative partners are screenwriters Christopher Markus and Stephen McFeely, who wrote all four of the Russo-directed Marvel films (Captain America: The Winter Soldier, Captain America: Civil War, Avengers: Infinity War and Avengers: Endgame), as well as The Gray Man and The Electric State. Markus and McFeely currently serve as Co-Presidents of story at AGBO. Their sister Angela Russo-Otstot, a producer and screenwriter, is also a key creative partner. She has worked on numerous AGBO projects and serves as the company's Chief Creative Officer, overseeing development across film and television.

On the filmmaking side, the Russos have repeatedly partnered with casting director Sarah Finn, who worked on all four Marvel films, as well as AGBO projects such as Mosul, Extraction, Cherry, The Electric State, and Everything Everywhere All At Once.

Musically, they have worked with composer Alan Silvestri on Infinity War, Endgame, and The Electric State, and frequently collaborate with composer Henry Jackman (Winter Soldier, Civil War, Cherry, The Bluff). Stunt coordinator-turned-director Sam Hargrave began his work with the Russos as Chris Evans' stunt double, and was elevated to 2nd unit director on Marvel films before making his directorial debut with Extraction and Extraction 2 under the AGBO banner.

Collaborator	Role	Total	Welcome to Collinwood	You, Me and Dupree	Captain America: The Winter Soldier	Captain America: Civil War	Avengers: Infinity War	Avengers: Endgame	Mosul	21 Bridges	Extraction	Cherry	Everything Everywhere All at Once	The Gray Man	Extraction 2	The Electric State	The Bluff	The Whisper Man	Avengers: Doomsday	Avengers: Secret Wars	Extraction 3
Adam Bessa	Actor	3							check		check				check						
Chadwick Boseman	Actor	4				check	check	check		check											
Angela Russo-Otstot	Writer, producer	9	check		check						check	check		check	check	check	check	check			
Matthew Michael Carnahan	Writer, director	2							check	check											
Mike Larocca	Producer	9							check	check	check	check	check	check	check	check					check
Michael Disco	Producer	2															check	check			
Matthew Schmidt	Editor	4			check	check	check	check													
Jeff Groth	Editor	2										check		check							
Chris Castaldi	Assistant director, producer	8				check	check	check			check	check		check	check	check					
Terry Notary	Actor, stunt coordinator	3					check	check								check					
Billy Gardell	Actor	2		check												check					
Ross Marquand	Actor	2					check	check													
Charles Minsky	Cinematographer	2	check	check																	
Michael Douglas	Actor	2		check				check													
Suhail Dabbach	Actor	2							check	check											
Robert Downey Jr.	Actor	5				check	check	check											check	check	
Chris Evans	Actor	7			check	check	check	check						check					check	check	
Geoffrey Haley	Camera operator, executive producer	5					check	check				check		check		check					
Sarah Halley Finn	Casting director, producer	13			check	check	check	check	check		check		check	check	check	check	check		check	check	
Robert Redford	Actor	2			check			check													
Gwyneth Paltrow	Actress	2					check	check													
Cobie Smulders	Actress	3			check		check	check													
Ke Huy Quan	Actor	3											check			check			check		
William Hurt	Actor	3				check	check	check													
Stephen F. Windon	Cinematographer	2												check		check					
Jeffrey Ford	Editor	9			check	check	check	check				check		check		check			check	check	
Dennis Gassner	Production designer	2						check								check					
Sam Hargrave	Stunt coordinator, actor, director	7			check	check	check	check			check				check						check
Chris Hemsworth	Actor	6					check	check			check				check				check		check
Tom Holland	Actor	5				check	check	check				check							check		
Jacob Batalon	Actor	2					check	check													
Henry Jackman	Composer	9			check	check			check	check	check	check		check	check		check				
Anthony Mackie	Actor	7			check	check	check	check								check			check	check	
Judianna Makovsky	Costume designer	8			check	check	check	check						check		check			check	check	
Christopher Markus and Stephen McFeely	Writers, executive producers	8			check	check	check	check						check		check			check	check	
Chris Pratt	Actor	3					check	check								check					
Zoe Saldaña	Actor	2					check	check													
Danai Gurira	Actress	2					check	check													
Alan Silvestri	Composer	5					check	check								check			check	check	
Trent Opaloch	Cinematographer	4			check	check	check	check													
Newton Thomas Sigel	Cinematographer	3										check							check	check	
Sebastian Stan	Actor	5			check	check	check	check											check		
Letitia Wright	Actress	4					check	check											check	check	
Paul Rudd	Actor	3				check		check											check		
Winston Duke	Actor	3					check	check											check		
Tom Hiddleston	Actor	3					check	check											check		
Jeremy Renner	Actor	2				check		check													
Benedict Cumberbatch	Actor	4					check	check											check	check	
Hayley Atwell	Actress	4			check			check											check	check	
Benedict Wong	Actor	3					check	check											check		
Scarlett Johansson	Actress	4			check	check	check	check													
Frank Grillo	Actor	3			check	check		check													
Samuel L. Jackson	Actor	3			check		check	check													
Josh Brolin	Actor	2					check	check													
Paul Bettany	Actor	3				check	check													check	
Elizabeth Olsen	Actress	5			check	check	check	check											check		
Mark Ruffalo	Actor	3					check	check											check		
Emily VanCamp	Actress	2			check	check															
Don Cheadle	Actor	3				check	check	check													
Dave Bautista	Actor	2					check	check													
Pom Klementieff	Actress	2					check	check													
Karen Gillan	Actress	2					check	check													
Bradley Cooper	Actor	2					check	check													
Vin Diesel	Actor	2					check	check													
Marisa Tomei	Actress	2				check		check													
Maximiliano Hernández	Actor	2			check			check													
Callan Mulvey	Actor	3			check			check						check							
Kerry Condon	Actress	3				check	check	check													
Florence Kasumba	Actress	2				check	check														
John Slattery	Actor	2				check		check													
Michael James Shaw	Actor, director, writer	2					check	check													
Tom Vaughan-Lawlor	Actor	2					check	check													
Golshifteh Farahani	Actress	3									check				check						check
Idris Elba	Actor	3					check								check						check
David Harbour	Actor	2									check								check		
Michael Waldron	Writer, producer	2																	check	check	
Pedro Pascal	Actor	2																	check	check	
Vanessa Kirby	Actress	2																	check	check	
Joseph Quinn	Actor	2																	check	check	
Ebon Moss-Bachrach	Actor	2																	check	check	

== Accolades ==
In 2004, Anthony and Joe Russo won a Primetime Emmy Award for Outstanding Directing for a Comedy Series for the pilot episode of Arrested Development.

In 2015, 2017 and 2019, they were nominated jointly for the Saturn Award for Best Director for Captain America: The Winter Soldier, Captain America: Civil War and Avengers: Endgame, respectively. In 2015, 2019 and 2020, they were nominated for the Hugo Award for Best Dramatic Presentation – Long Form for Captain America: The Winter Soldier, Avengers: Infinity War and Avengers: Endgame, respectively. All nominations were shared with writers Christopher Markus and Stephen McFeely. They received Dragon Award nominations for "Best Science Fiction or Fantasy Movie" for Captain America: Civil War in 2016 and for Avengers: Infinity War in 2018. The brothers won the Dragon Award in that category for Avengers: Endgame in 2019.

On February 21, 2025, the Russo brothers were honored with the handprint and footprint ceremony in front of Grauman's Chinese Theatre in Hollywood. They were joined by family, friends and colleagues Chris Pratt, Yvette Nicole Brown and Alison Brie.

== Business interests ==
In January 2025, Joe Russo was announced as a board member and investor of English football club Sheffield United. The club was taken over by the consortium group COH Sports led by fellow American businessmen Steve Rosen and Helmy Eltoukhy. Joe was joined on the board of directors by former Cleveland Cavaliers CEO Len Komoroski and real estate figure Terry Ahern.

== Filmography ==
Key
†	Denotes films that have not yet been released

=== Film ===
Year	Title	Directors	Producers	Writer(s)
1997	Pieces (Note: Unreleased theatrically in the United States.)	Yes	Yes	Yes
2002	Welcome to Collinwood	Yes	No	Yes
2006	You, Me and Dupree	Yes	No	No
2014	Captain America: The Winter Soldier	Yes	No	No
2016	Captain America: Civil War	Yes	No	No
2018	Avengers: Infinity War	Yes	No	No
2019	Avengers: Endgame	Yes	No	No
2020	Extraction	No	Yes	Story (Both) / Screenplay (Joe)
2021	Cherry	Yes	Yes	No
2022	The Gray Man	Yes	Yes	Joe
2023	Extraction 2	No	Yes	Story (Both) / Screenplay (Joe)
2025	The Electric State	Yes	Yes	No
2026	Avengers: Doomsday †	Yes	Yes	No
TBA	Extraction 3 †	No	Yes	Screenplay (Joe)

Executive producers

Year	Title	Director
2007	Crashing	Gary Walkow
2014	A Merry Friggin' Christmas	Tristram Shapeero
2018	Dizzy Pursuit	Jay Alvarez
2019	Back from the Brink: Saved from Extinction	Sean Casey
2020	Relic	Natalie Erika James
2023	All Fun and Games	Ari Costa; Eren Celeboglu
2027	John Rambo	Jalmari Helander

Producers only

Year	Title	Director
2019	21 Bridges	Brian Kirk
2019	Mosul	Matthew Michael Carnahan
2022	Everything Everywhere All at Once	Daniel Kwan; Daniel Scheinert
2026	The Bluff	Frank E. Flowers
2026	The Whisper Man	James Ashcroft

Uncredited directors

- Ant-Man (2015) (Post-credits scene)
- Captain Marvel (2019) (Mid-credits scene)
- Thunderbolts* (2025) (Post-credits scene)
- The Fantastic Four: First Steps (2025) (Mid-credits scene)

=== Television ===
Year	Title	Director(s)	Executive producers	Episode(s)
2003	Lucky	Yes	No	"Pilot", "Up the Streaks"
2003–2005	Arrested Development	Yes	No	Episodes Both: "Pilot"; Anthony only: "Top Banana", "Key Decisions", "The Immaculate Election", "Spring Breakout"; Joe only: "Bringing Up Buster", "In God We Trust", "Pier Pressure", "Marta Complex", "Shock and Aww", "Missing Kitty", "Hand to God", "Motherboy XXX", "Meat the Veals"
2004–2005	LAX	Yes	Yes	Episodes Both: "Pilot"; Anthony only: "The Longest Day", "The Pictures to Prove It", "Mixed Signals"; Joe only: "Finnegan Again, Begin Again", "Thanksgiving", "Senator's Daughter"; 7 episodes
2006	What About Brian	Yes	No	"Pilot"
2007–2008	Carpoolers	Yes	Yes	Episodes Both: "Pilot"; Anthony only: "The Code", "Wheel of Fortune", "The Recital"; Joe only: "Laird of the Rings", "What Would You Do?", "Down for the Count", "A Divorce to Remember", "The Seminar", "The Handsomest Man", "Lost in America"; 11 episodes
2009	Comedy Showcase	Yes	No	"The Increasingly Poor Decisions of Todd Margaret"
2009–2014	Community	Yes	Yes	Episodes Both: "Pilot"; Anthony only: "Introduction to Film", "Social Psychology", "Home Economics", "The Politics of Human Sexuality", "Physical Education", "Beginner Pottery", "The Psychology of Letting Go", "Basic Rocket Science", "Asian Population Studies", "Custody Law and Eastern European Diplomacy", "Biology 101", "Competitive Ecology", "Foosball and Nocturnal Vigilantism"; Joe only: "Spanish 101", "Advanced Criminal Law", "Football, Feminism and You", "Debate 109", "Investigative Journalism", "Romantic Expressionism", "Pascal's Triangle Revisited", "Anthropology 101", "Accounting for Lawyers", "Cooperative Calligraphy", "Advanced Dungeons & Dragons", "Intermediate Documentary Filmmaking", "Competitive Wine Tasting", "A Fistful of Paintballs", "For a Few Paintballs More", "Geography of Global Conflict", "Advanced Gay", "Documentary Filmmaking: Redux", "Geothermal Escapism", "Advanced Advanced Dungeons & Dragons"; 34 episodes
2010	Running Wilde	Yes	Yes	"Pilot"
2010	The Increasingly Poor Decisions of Todd Margaret	Yes	No	Original Comedy Showcase Pilot
2011–2012	Happy Endings	Yes	Yes	Episodes Both: "Pilot"; Anthony only: "Barefoot Pedaler", "Blax, Snake, Home", "Secrets and Limos"; Joe only: "Bo Fight", "Yesandwitch", "The St. Valentine's Day Massacre"; 7 episodes
2011–2012	Up All Night	Joe	No	Episodes "Cool Neighbors", "Working Late and Working It", "Day After Valentine's Day"
2012	Animal Practice	Yes	Yes	Episodes Both: "Pilot"; Anthony only: "Clean-Smelling Pirate"; Joe only: "Ralphie"; 3 episodes
2015	Agent Carter	Joe	No	Episode: "Bridge and Tunnel" (as Joseph V. Russo)
2019	Deadly Class	No	Yes	10 episodes
2019	Larry Charles' Dangerous World of Comedy	No	Yes	4 episodes
2022–present	From	No	Yes	20 episodes
2023–present	Citadel	Joe	Yes	Director of Season 2

Other

- Fortnite Battle Royale - Chapter 2, Season 6 opening cinematic (co-directed, March 2021).

=== Joe Russo acting credits ===
Year	Title	Role	Notes
2005	Arrested Development	Joe	Episode: "Hand to God"
2006	You, Me and Dupree	Personnel Manager	Credited as Gozie Agbo
2014	Captain America: The Winter Soldier	Dr. Fine	Credited as Gozie Agbo
2016	Captain America: Civil War	Dr. Theo Broussard	Credited as Gozie Agbo
2018	Avengers: Infinity War	Bert	Deleted scene
2019	Avengers: Endgame	Grieving Man	Credited as Gozie Agbo
2019	Avengers: Endgame	Thanos	Additional motion-capture only, uncredited
2020	The Simpsons	Movie Executive (voice)	Episode: "Bart the Bad Guy"
2021	Cherry	Restaurant Owner	Credited as Gozie Agbo
2022	The Gray Man	CIA DDO Fine	Credited as Gozie Agbo
2025	The Electric State	CNN Reporter / Various Robots (voice)	

== See also ==
- List of highest-grossing film directors
