= Basil Russo =

American judge (born 1947)

Personal details
- Born: Basil M. Russo; March 10, 1947 (age 78) Cleveland, Ohio, U.S.
- Party: Democratic
- Spouse: Patricia Gallupoli
- Children: Anthony; Joe; Angela
- Education: John Carroll University, Cleveland State University (JD)
- Occupation: Judge; attorney
- Known for: City Council Majority Leader, Cuyahoga County Court of Common Pleas, Judge of the Eighth District Court of Appeals, President of the Conference of Presidents of Major Italian American Organizations.

Basil M. Russo (born March 10, 1947) is an American attorney, politician of the Democratic Party, and judge. He was majority leader of the Cleveland City Council. Later he served as a judge of the Cuyahoga County Court of Common Pleas and a judge of the Ohio's Eighth District Court of Appeals.

Russo served as managing partner of the law firm of Russo, Rosalina & Co, LPA from the firm's founding in 1978 until his retirement in 2014, except during the years he served on the bench. In 2014, Basil was elected as president of the Italian Sons and Daughters of America. He is the father of Anthony and Joe Russo, directors of several successful Marvel superhero films, Angela Russo-Otstot, Senior Vice President of Story at AGBO Films, and Gabriella Rosalina, Managing Partner of Russo, Rosalina & Co.

== Early and personal life ==
Russo is the son of the late State Rep. and Cleveland ward leader Anthony J. and Domenica "Donnie" Russo. He is married to Patricia Russo. He is of Italian descent.

Russo attended St. Peter Chanel High School and received an undergraduate degree from John Carroll University and his J.D. degree from the Cleveland State University Cleveland-Marshall College of Law.

Russo's two sons, Anthony and Joe, are Hollywood filmmakers, who are known for Welcome to Collinwood, You, Me and Dupree, Captain America: The Winter Soldier, Captain America: Civil War, Avengers: Infinity War, Avengers: Endgame and Cherry.

== Italian American cultural organizations ==
Russo currently serves as president of the Conference of Presidents of Major Italian American Organizations. He was elected president in 2020. The organization is headquartered in New York City and it serves as the national representative of its 50 member Italian American organizations from throughout the U.S. Russo also serves as national president of the Italian Sons and Daughters of America. He was first elected in 2014, and again every two years thereafter. The ISDA is headquartered in Pittsburgh and is one of the largest Italian American fraternal associations in the U.S. He is also president of the Justinian Forum Italian American Bar Association and is Chairman of the Cleveland Italian Film Festival. He has served as a member of the executive committee of the National Italian American Foundation in Washington, D.C.

== Religious involvement ==
Russo initiated the creation of the Bishop Anthony Pilla Italian American Studies Program at John Carroll University, a Jesuit school and his alma mater. Russo and his wife Patricia also served as chairpersons of the Advisory Committee for the Marriage and Family Ministry of the Cleveland Diocese.

== Awards and recognition ==
Freedom Award from the American Nationalities Movement, Cleveland International Hall of Fame Inductee, Academy of Television Arts and Sciences Award, Benedictine Italian Heritage Honoree, Lifetime Achievement Award from the Cleveland Italian American Heritage Committee, Special Recognition Award from the Italian American Festival Committee, Columbian Award from the Federation of Italian American Societies, Justinian Award from the Italian American Bar Association, Award of Excellence from the San Leone Society, ISDA Outstanding Young Man of the Year Award, Multiple United States Senatorial and Congressional Proclamations for various accomplishments and achievements sponsored and presented by: Senator Rob Portman, Senator Sherrod Brown, Senator George Voinovich, Senator Mike DeWine, Congressman Dennis Kucinich, Congressman David P. Joyce, Congresswoman Marcia Fudge, and Governor John Kasich.

== Political career ==
Russo served as majority leader of Cleveland City Council.
