= Lions for Lambs =

2007 American war drama film by Robert Redford

- Theatrical release poster
- Directed by: Robert Redford
- Written by: Matthew Michael Carnahan
- Produced by: Robert Redford; Matthew Michael Carnahan; Tracy Falco; Andrew Hauptman
- Starring: Robert Redford; Meryl Streep; Tom Cruise; Michael Peña; Andrew Garfield; Peter Berg; Derek Luke
- Cinematography: Philippe Rousselot
- Edited by: Joe Hutshing
- Music by: Mark Isham
- Production companies: Metro-Goldwyn-Mayer Pictures; United Artists; Wildwood Enterprises; Brat Na Pont; Andell Entertainment
- Distributed by: MGM Distribution Co. (United States and Canada); 20th Century Fox (International)
- Release dates: November 8, 2007 (Hong Kong); November 9, 2007 (U.S.)
- Running time: 92 minutes
- Country: United States
- Language: English
- Budget: $35 million
- Box office: $64.8 million

Lions for Lambs is a 2007 American war drama film directed by Robert Redford about the connection between a platoon of United States soldiers in Afghanistan, a U.S. senator, a reporter, and a Californian college professor. It stars Redford, Tom Cruise, Meryl Streep, and Andrew Garfield in his feature film debut. It was the first Cruise/Wagner Productions film since the company joined with United Artists subsequent to Cruise's falling out with Paramount Pictures in 2006.

With a title that alludes to incompetent leaders sending brave soldiers into the slaughter of battle, the film takes aim at the U.S. government's prosecution of the wars in the Middle East, showing three parallel stories: a senator who launches a new military strategy and details it to a journalist, two soldiers involved in that operation, and their college professor trying to re-engage a promising student by telling him their story. The film was written by Matthew Michael Carnahan. It was released by MGM Distribution Co. in North America on November 9, 2007, with 20th Century Fox releasing in other territories, to mixed reviews and disappointing box office receipts.

== Plot ==
Two students at a West Coast university, Arian and Ernest, at the urging of their idealistic professor, Dr. Malley, attempt to do something important with their lives. They make the bold decision to enlist in the army to fight in Afghanistan after graduating from college.

Dr. Malley also attempts to reach a talented and privileged but disaffected student, Todd Hayes, who is not at all like Arian and Ernest. He is naturally bright, comes from a privileged background, but has apparently slipped into apathy upon being disillusioned at the present state of affairs. Now, he devotes most of his time to extra-curricular activities like his role as president of his fraternity. Malley tests him by offering a choice between a respectable grade of 'B' in the class with no additional work required or a final opportunity to re-engage with the material of the class and "do something." Before Todd makes his choice, he must listen to Dr. Malley's story of his former students Arian and Ernest and why they are in Afghanistan.

Meanwhile, in Washington, D.C., a Republican presidential nominee, Senator Jasper Irving, has invited liberal TV journalist Janine Roth to his office to announce a new war strategy in Afghanistan: the use of small units to seize strategic positions in the mountains before the Taliban can occupy them. The senator hopes that Roth's positive coverage will help convince the public that the plan is sound.

Roth has her doubts and fears she is being asked to become an instrument of government propaganda. She informs her commercially-minded boss of her plans to call out the senator's new strategy for what she feels is a ploy, but is shot down. Ultimately, Irving's version of the story is run without the critical interaction. Whether Roth gave in and toed the company line or quit her job is not clear.

In Afghanistan, a helicopter carrying Arian and Ernest is hit by Taliban insurgents. Ernest falls out, and Arian jumps after him. Ernest's leg is badly wounded, and he suffers a compound fracture, rendering him immobile as the Taliban arrive. After a drawn-out gunfight, the U.S. soldiers run out of ammunition. Rather than getting captured, Arian helps Ernest stand up, facing the enemies and turning their empty weapons against them, an action which prompts the Taliban to kill them. The unit commanders attempt a rescue of the downed soldiers, sending A-10 Warthogs, but weather, time, and distance interfere.

Hayes is watching television with a friend. A reporter is discussing a singer's private life, while below runs a strip announcing Senator Irving's new military plan for Afghanistan. Hayes suddenly falls quiet, contemplating the choices with which his professor had left him.

== Cast ==
- Robert Redford as Professor Stephen Malley
- Meryl Streep as Janine Roth
- Tom Cruise as Senator Jasper Irving (R-IL)
- Michael Peña as Ernest Rodriguez
- Andrew Garfield as Todd Hayes
- Derek Luke as Arian Finch
- Peter Berg as Lieutenant Colonel Falco
- Kevin Dunn as Howard, ANX Editor

== Production ==
Matthew Michael Carnahan was inspired to write the script when, while channel surfing trying to find a USC Trojans football game, he saw a news report about a Humvee that had flipped into an Iraqi river, drowning about five U.S. soldiers. Carnahan considered it an awful way to die, and "couldn't get past it fast enough", considering he was too indifferent, "talking so much and not doing a damn thing", and "the same hypocrite that I so can't stand in our country, the kind of people that will flip right past the news to get to Access Hollywood". He first considered turning it into a stage play, but the military scenes, in particular the helicopter ones, made him turn it into a screenplay. The character of Todd Hayes was inspired by Carnahan himself during college.

When Robert Redford read the script, he became very interested, considering it smart as opposed to Hollywood's many "straight-out entertainment" projects, and also tricky due to the three stories "that seem to be disparate but are connected and have to come together in a vortex at the end", and that needed to be represented in a way the movie "wouldn't be categorized as a lefty film". Redford considered that the movie's focus was for audiences "to be entertained in a way that made them think".

An Irish newspaper claimed that "The name of the film is derived from a remark made by a German officer during World War I, comparing British soldiers' bravery with the calculated criminality of their commanders". While several reviewers in the UK have criticized the film for misquoting the commonly used phrase of "lions led by donkeys", in an article written for The Times on the origin of the title, Brian Dimuccio and Dino Vindeni claimed that:

One such composition included the observation, 'Nowhere have I seen such Lions led by such Lambs.' While the exact provenance of this quotation has been lost to history, most experts agree it was written during the Battle of the Somme, one of the bloodiest clashes in modern warfare. While some military archivists credit the author as an anonymous infantryman, others argue that the source was none other than General Max von Gallwitz, Supreme Commander [sic] of the German forces. In either case, it is generally accepted to be a derivation of Alexander the Great's proclamation, 'I am never afraid of an army of Lions led into battle by a Lamb. I fear more the army of Lambs who have a Lion to lead them.'

Though Lions for Lambs was the first United Artists venture since Cruise and Paula Wagner attained control, executives billed the film as a "Robert Redford vehicle". Filming began on January 29, 2007, and Redford considered the movie "the tightest schedule I've ever worked with", with barely a year between announcement and release.

=== Promotion ===
Lions for Lambs is the first film under Cruise's and Wagner's new venture with film studio United Artists. MSNBC reported that Cruise was worried about how the film would perform, because of how the film industry would view him based on its success or failure at the box office.

== Reception ==
=== Critical response ===
On the review aggregator website Rotten Tomatoes, 28% of 181 critics' reviews are positive. The website's consensus reads: "Despite its powerhouse cast, Lions for Lambs feels like a disjointed series of lectures, rather than a sharp narrative, and ends up falling flat." Metacritic, which uses a weighted average, assigned the film a score of 47 out of 100, based on 36 critics, indicating "mixed or average" reviews. Audiences surveyed by CinemaScore gave the film an average grade of "C" on an A+ to F scale.

Film critic Roger Ebert gave it two and a half stars, noting that, at the beginning of the film, the viewer is "under the delusion that it's going somewhere". As the film progresses, Ebert wrote that interest was lost, noting: "When we begin to suspect it's going in circles, our interest flags". Matt Pais of the Chicago Tribune also gave the film two and a half stars, and wrote in summation: "Redford and Streep give it their all, but Cruise is Cruise, and the go-nowhere 'Lions' is more of an imitation of life than a reflection on it." A USA Today review gave the film two and a half stars as well, in a negative review titled: "As entertainment, Lions whimpers rather than roars". Reviewer Claudia Puig commented: "Though characters make some strong points, the film feels preachy and falls flat as entertainment". The New York Post gave the film one and a half stars, and did not recommend it, writing that "if you want to be bored by pompous-assery, Meet the Press is free". The Guardian was more critical, giving the film only one star, and calling it "a muddled and pompous film about America's war on terror".

Derek Elley of Variety wrote that, though the film was "star-heavy", it felt like "the movie equivalent of an Off Broadway play" and that it "uses a lot of words to say nothing new". The New York Times also mentioned the amount of dialogue in the film, writing: "It's a long conversation, more soporific than Socratic, and brimming with parental chiding, generational conflict and invocations of Vietnam", and the Los Angeles Times described the lecturing in the film as "dull and self-satisfied". The subtitle of the review in the Los Angeles Times was: "As a matter of policy, Lions for Lambs doesn't play." In a review entitled "Political drama feels more like a lecture" in The Boston Globe, Wesley Morris wrote: "It does not feel good to report that a movie with Robert Redford, Meryl Streep, and Tom Cruise makes the eyelids droop. But that's what Lions for Lambs does." Writing in the Seattle Post-Intelligencer, reviewer William Arnold wrote positively of the segments of the film involving Robert Redford's character: "His character, who hopes to save America one slacker at a time, rings true; and his real-life conviction and his fears for democracy come through". Amy Biancolli of the Houston Chronicle highlighted Redford's direction of the film, commenting that it was not his best film, but it was "his bravest". Ray Bennett of The Hollywood Reporter described Lions for Lambs as "a well-made movie that offers no answers but raises many important questions".

=== Box office ===
The film took in 6.7 million USD in its opening weekend and debuted at the number four spot. Despite a slow start, the film ultimately grossed $64.8 million worldwide, nearly doubling its budget.

== See also ==
- Operation Red Wings
- Battle of Takur Ghar
