= Adam Bessa =

French-Tunisian actor

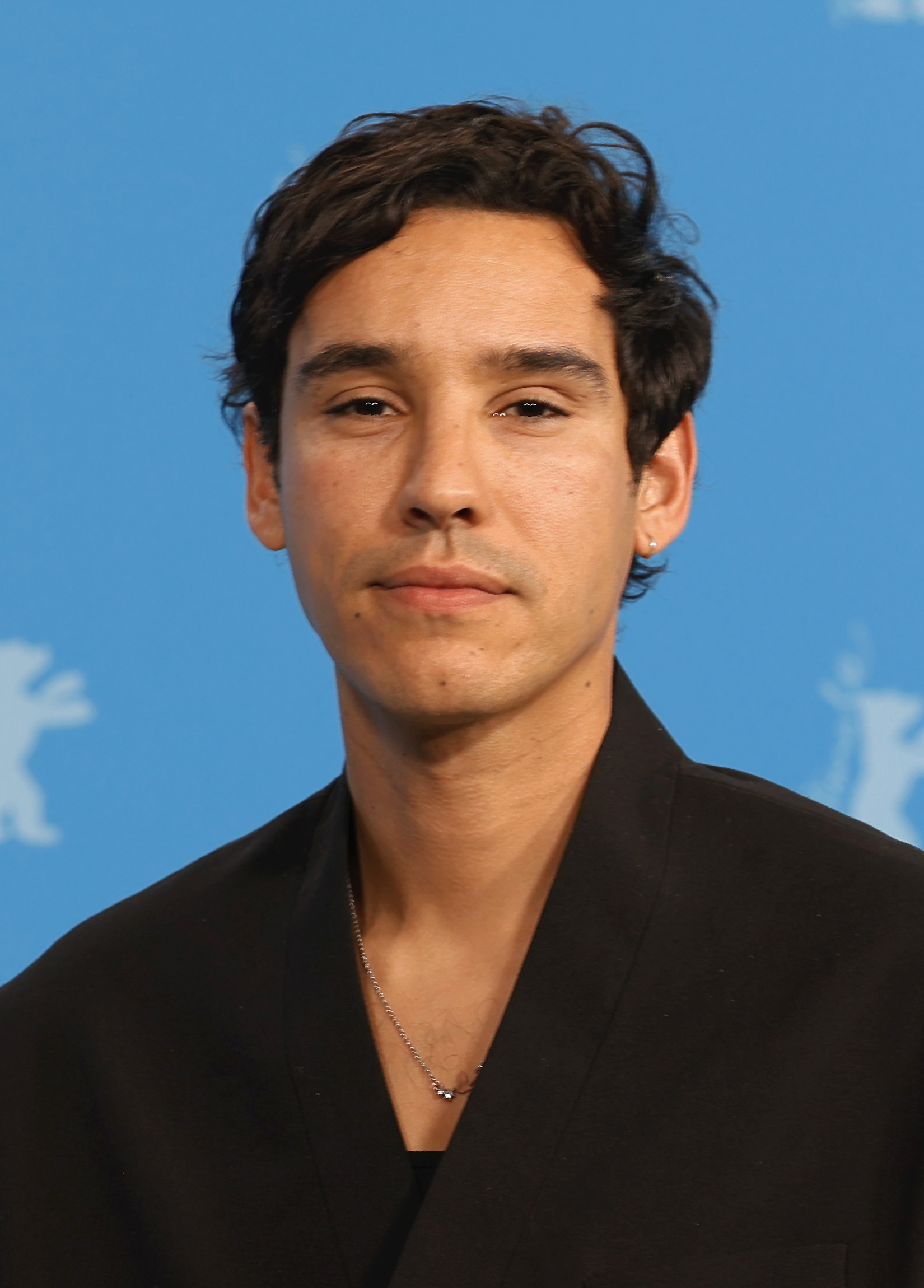
- Bessa at the 2024 Berlinale
- Born: 1992 (age 33–34); Grasse, Alpes-Maritimes, France
- Occupation: Actor
- Years active: 2010–present

Adam Bessa (born 1992) is a French-Tunisian actor, known for his roles in French and Hollywood productions such as Reda in The Blessed (2017), Kawa in Mosul (2019), soldier Yaz Kahn in Extraction (2020) and its 2023 sequel, and Abbas Naziri in the Amazon Prime Video series Hanna. For his performance in Harka (2022), he won the Un Certain Regard Award for Best Performance at the 2022 Cannes Film Festival.

== Biography ==
Bessa was born in Grasse, France in 1992, to an Italian-Tunisian mother and a Tunisian father. Bessa speaks French, Arabic, English and Italian.

Bessa decided to quit law school and pursue his long-standing passion for cinema. He bought a few books on acting and started to teach himself. He studied at Jean Périmony, a theatre school in Paris from 2011 to 2012, but he didn't like the experience. What he proposed in the exercises was too "cinematic", and he was told that he showed too little and wasn't expressive enough, so he quit and went back to Marseille to work as a real estate agent and then as a fishmonger, his other passion. Some time later, a friend asked him to star in a short film. He made his film debut in 2010 in Le Rapport Homme Femme, directed by Olivier André. In 2013, he appeared in Les Mouettes by Claire Fontecave. In 2015, he played Jason in the romantic thriller Of Sound Mind, directed by Simon G. Mueller.

In 2017, he starred as Reda in Sofia Djama's The Blessed. For his performance in the film, he was one of the young actors shortlisted to compete for the César Award for Most Promising Actor, but he did not get the nomination. Bessa kept working as a fishmonger in Marseille even after starring in The Blessed because he did not want to settle in Paris, where he didn't feel good and was wasting away. In 2019, he played police officer Kawa in the Arabic-language American war film Mosul, directed by Matthew Michael Carnahan and based on the 2016 Battle of Mosul.

In 2020, he played mercenary Yaz Kahn in the American war film Extraction, directed by Sam Hargrave. He reprised his role in the 2023 sequel, Extraction 2. In 2021, he appeared as Abbas Naziri in 5 episodes of season 3 of the Amazon Prime Video series Hanna.

In 2022, he starred in three films: Azuro directed by Matthieu Rozé; Le Prix du passage directed by Thierry Binisti; and the drama Harka directed by Lotfy Nathan, for which he won the Un Certain Regard Award for Best Performance at the 2022 Cannes Film Festival for his performance as Ali Hamdi, and was named as one of the Revelations of 2022 and pre-selected to compete for the César Award for Most Promising Actor.

Bessa will next star in Meryam Joobeur's Who Do I Belong To (Mé el Aïn), a film about a mother and daughter in an isolated Tunisian village.

== Filmography ==
=== Feature films ===
Year	Title	Role	Director
2010	Le Rapport Homme Femme		Olivier André
2013	Les Mouettes		Claire Fontecave
2015	Of Sound Mind	Jason	Simon G. Mueller
2017	The Blessed	Reda	Sofia Djama
2019	Mosul	Kawa	Matthew Michael Carnahan
2020	Extraction	Yaz Kahn	Sam Hargrave
2021	Haute Couture	Abdel	Sylvie Ohayon
2022	Azuro	Kosta	Matthieu Rozé
2022	Harka	Ali Hamdi	Lotfy Nathan
2022	Le Prix du passage	Walid	Thierry Binisti
2023	Extraction 2	Yaz Kahn	Sam Hargrave
2024	Who Do I Belong To (Mé el Aïn)	Bilal	Meryam Joobeur
TBA	Santo Subito!	Mehmet Ali Ağca	Bertrand Bonello

=== Short films ===
Year	Title	Role	Director
2014	La Stravaganza	Louis	Vanya Chokrollahi
2015	Elles s'appellent toutes Marie	The musician	James Down

=== Television ===
Year	Title	Role	Notes
2011	Josephine, Guardian Angel	Bilal Bouazid	TV series; 1 episode
2020	Amours solitaires	Simon	Web-series, 1 episode
2021	Hanna	Abbas Naziri	TV series, season 3, 5 episodes

== Theatre ==
Year	Title	Director	Notes	Ref.
2014	César et Rosalie	Anne-Marie Philippe	Théâtre des déchargeurs	
2016	Requiem Pour de Faux	Claire Fontecave		

== Awards and nominations ==
Year	Award / Festival	Category	Work	Result	Ref(s)
2022	Cannes Film Festival	Un Certain Regard Award for Best Performance	Harka	Won	
2022	Saint-Jean-de-Luz Film Festival	Best Male Performance	Harka	Won	
2022	Red Sea International Film Festival	Best Actor	Harka	Won	
2023	Lumière Awards	Best Male Revelation	Harka	Nominated	
2023	Paris Film Critics Association	Best Young Actor	Harka	Nominated	
