= Steve Mosby =

British crime writer

Alex North
- Born: Steve Mosby; Leeds, England
- Occupation: Novelist
- Writing career
- Language: English
- Genres: Crime fiction, thriller
- Notable work: The Whisper Man
- Notable awards: CWA Dagger in the Library (2012)

Steve Mosby, known by his pen name Alex North, is a British crime writer from Leeds, England. He published a series of crime novels under his own name before adopting the Alex North pseudonym. As Mosby, he won the Crime Writers' Association Dagger in the Library in 2012.

His first novel as Alex North, The Whisper Man, was published in 2019. It received widespread critical coverage and was shortlisted for the Ian Fleming Steel Dagger in 2020. The novel was adapted into the film The Whisper Man, directed by James Ashcroft and starring Robert De Niro, Michelle Monaghan, Adam Scott and Michael Keaton. The film was released by Netflix in 2026.

== Early life ==
Mosby was born in Leeds. He studied philosophy at the University of Leeds. He later worked in the university's sociology department before becoming a full-time writer.

== Career ==
His debut novel, The Third Person, was published in 2003. Mosby initially published crime fiction under his own name. His novels included The 50/50 Killer, Cry for Help, Black Flowers, Dark Room, The Nightmare Place, The Reckoning on Cane Hill and You Can Run.

The 50/50 Killer received a positive review in The Guardian in 2007. The review described Mosby as a skilled thriller writer. The novel was also a finalist for the Barry Award for Best British Crime Novel.

His 2008 novel Cry for Help was also reviewed in The Guardian. The newspaper praised its structure and psychological tension.

In 2012, Mosby won the Crime Writers' Association Dagger in the Library. The award recognises an author's body of work and popularity with library users. A profile published by The Guardian that year noted his success outside the United Kingdom and the critical attention given to his novels.

=== Alex North ===
Mosby began writing as Alex North with The Whisper Man. The novel was published in 2019. It follows a father and son who move to a town where a child disappears in circumstances linked to a convicted serial killer.

The novel received reviews in The Guardian, Kirkus Reviews and Library Journal. Its screen rights were acquired before publication by AGBO, the production company founded by Anthony Russo and Joe Russo.

North followed the novel with The Shadows in 2020. It was published in the United Kingdom as The Shadow Friend. Publishers Weekly described it as a suspenseful and fast-moving thriller.

His third Alex North novel was published in 2023. It was titled The Angel Maker in the United States and The Half Burnt House in the United Kingdom. The Guardian praised North's handling of its complex plot. The novel was also reviewed by Publishers Weekly.

The Man Made of Smoke was published in 2025. It received positive reviews from Publishers Weekly and Bookreporter.

== Reception ==
Mosby's early novels were noted for combining crime plots with psychological horror. Reviews of his later work as Alex North have also discussed supernatural elements, family relationships and the effects of past violence.

The Whisper Man attracted particularly broad critical coverage. Book Marks recorded reviews from publications including The New York Times Book Review, The Guardian and the New York Journal of Books.

== Awards and nominations ==
Year	Work	Award	Result
2008	The 50/50 Killer	Barry Award for Best British Crime Novel	Finalist
2012	Body of work	CWA Dagger in the Library	Won
2020	The Whisper Man	CWA Ian Fleming Steel Dagger	Shortlisted

== Bibliography ==
=== As Steve Mosby ===
- The 50/50 Killer
- Cry for Help
- Black Flowers
- Dark Room, published in the United States as The Murder Code
- The Nightmare Place
- The Reckoning on Cane Hill
- You Can Run

=== As Alex North ===
- The Whisper Man (2019)
- The Shadows (2020), published in the United Kingdom as The Shadow Friend
- The Angel Maker (2023), published in the United Kingdom as The Half Burnt House
- The Man Made of Smoke (2025)

== Personal life ==
Mosby lives in Leeds with his wife and son.
