= Introduction to Statistics (Community) =

- Community episode
- Episode no.: Season 1 Episode 7
- Directed by: Justin Lin
- Written by: Tim Hobert; Jon Pollack
- Production code: 106
- Original air date: October 29, 2009

Guest appearances
- Jim Rash as Dean Craig Pelton; Lauren Stamile as Professor Michelle Slater; Richard Erdman as Leonard; Dino Stamatopoulos as Star-Burns

Episode chronology
← Previous "Football, Feminism and You"	Next → "Home Economics"
- Community season 1

"Introduction to Statistics" is the seventh episode of the first season of the American comedy television series Community, airing on NBC on October 29, 2009. Annie (Alison Brie) hosts a Dia de los Muertos party, the success of which depends on Jeff (Joel McHale) attending. At the party, Pierce gets high, causing trouble for the other characters. Jeff pursues their statistics professor, Professor Michelle Slater (Lauren Stamile). Finally, Shirley (Yvette Nicole Brown) is distressed due to her ex-husband's behavior.

== Plot ==
Annie (Alison Brie) announces to the Spanish class that she will be hosting a Día de los Muertos-themed Halloween party for extra credit, hoping that Jeff (Joel McHale) will attend as his popularity would influence others to attend as well. Shirley (Yvette Nicole Brown) announces to the study group that she has returned her wedding ring to her ex-husband, who had cheated on her months prior.

After confirming with Britta (Gillian Jacobs) that she does not see him as a sexual prospect, Jeff asks out his statistics instructor, Professor Michelle Slater (Lauren Stamile), but she tells him she does not date students. Shirley believes that Britta is upset with Jeff pursuing Slater after being interested in Britta.

Annie invites Jeff to the party but he initially declines, claiming it conflicts with his enjoyment of life. After Annie breaks down in tears, recalling how unpopular she was in high school, Jeff reluctantly agrees.

At the party, the study group is dressed in their Halloween costumes: Annie comes as a skeleton, Britta as a modest squirrel, Troy (Donald Glover) as Eddie Murphy, Abed (Danny Pudi) as Batman, Shirley as Harry Potter (mistaken by others as Steve Urkel) and Pierce (Chevy Chase) as the Beastmaster. Jeff does not wear a costume. Señor Chang (Ken Jeong), dressed as a matador, lets Jeff know that Slater is attending the faculty party in the cafeteria.

Star-Burns (Dino Stamatopoulos) runs into Pierce in the bathroom; while Pierce is taking his medication, Star-Burns suggests Pierce trade some of his pills for the ones that Star-Burns has. Pierce, in an attempt to feel younger, agrees.

Jeff asks Chang to make him his plus one to the faculty party so he can see Professor Slater. Chang agrees in exchange for $20. Jeff quietly grabs his coat and leaves Annie's party before anyone notices.

Annie gathers everyone from the party in a circle to start dancing. She invites Jeff up to have the first dance of the night, but he isn't there. Once everyone realizes Jeff has left the party, people begin to express their desire to leave. Britta tries to cover for him, enlisting Shirley to help get him back. Pierce, meanwhile, is high on Star-Burns's pills and begins hitting on Annie, who rebuffs his advances.

Jeff makes it into the faculty Halloween party wearing a cowboy costume. He finds Professor Slater dressed in a revealing Robin Hood outfit and immediately makes advances on her. Britta interrupts their conversation to try to convince Jeff to go back to Annie's party. Meanwhile, Abed and Troy need help dealing with Pierce, and Shirley defaces Professor Slater's car, claiming to be defending Britta. Britta then catches Shirley in Slater's office with a water hose, at which point Shirley breaks down and confesses that her ex-husband had asked for his wedding ring to give to his new girlfriend. She realizes that her anger was directed towards her ex-husband, not Slater, and apologizes to Britta for her actions, although Britta secretly breaks one of Slater's awards anyway. Pierce begins to lose control due to the drugs, driving everyone out of the party.

At the faculty party, Chang gives Jeff some advice to boost his ego so he can continue wooing Slater. After talking to Chang, Jeff approaches her and tries an honest, direct, self-deprecating approach. She agrees to sleep with him. As they leave the faculty party together, they walk by the library, where Pierce has barricaded himself in with office furniture. Jeff tries to ignore Pierce's cries for help but eventually walks away from Slater to help his friends. Jeff enters the fortress, where he successfully calms Pierce down. The fortress begins to collapse on top of Jeff and Pierce, but Abed, dressed as Batman, comes to rescue them. The episode ends with Jeff dancing with Annie, as Abed narrates over the proceedings in a parody of Batman in the ending of The Dark Knight.

The end tag consists of Troy and Abed in their costumes. Troy asks Abed if he would eat himself if he woke up as a doughnut one day. They both agree they would.

== Reception ==
In its original broadcast this episode was viewed by 5.32 million.

The episode was met with positive reviews.

Emily VanDerWerff of The A.V. Club rated the episode positively with A− and liked the exploration of the characters, "I feel like we're going to get more backstory that explains everything about [Britta], but at the same time, I’m really enjoying how the show is gradually filling in both who she is and who she wants to be. But I feel like the show is doing that with all of the characters by this point." Sean Gandert of Paste rated it 9.1/10 saying the episode, "shows off how silly, unique, and flat-out hilarious the show can be."

Jonah Krakow of IGN rated the episode 8/10 with "But this [episode] got things back on track by once again making Jeff (Joel McHale) the center of attention and giving his supporting cast the opportunity to provide solid laughs in short, razor-sharp bursts." Alan Sepinwall likewise felt the episode represented a comeback after a string of disappointing episodes, remarking, "That's more like it. 'Introduction to Statistics' was the strongest episode the show's done in several weeks. It made good use of the whole ensemble, giving every character a chance to shine without anyone's schtick feeling overdone." He praised the episode as an effective mix of "character-driven conflict ..., broad comedy ..., random pop culture references ... and sharp dialogue," illustrating each element of the mix with his favorite examples from the episode.

Eric Hochberger of TV Fanatic praised Danny Pudi's character as the highlight of the episode with, "As funny as those plot lines were [...] it was actually Abed dressed as Batman in the background that won us over." Sepinwall likewise named Abed's Batman as an example of judicious use of quirky character material, and added that he was enjoying the show's use of Abed/Troy scenes as closers given that the two actors "work so well together that it seems right they get these weird little showcases.

In a retrospective towards the end of season 4, Josh Sorokach of Vulture remarked that the episode was the first to hint at "the shape of absurdity to come" with a balance between capers and emotional stakes.
