= The Bluff (film) =

2026 film by Frank E. Flowers

- Release poster
- Directed by: Frank E. Flowers
- Written by: Joe Ballarini; Frank E. Flowers
- Produced by: Joe Russo; Anthony Russo; Angela Russo-Otstot; Michael Disco; Priyanka Chopra; Cisely Saldana; Mariel Saldana
- Starring: Priyanka Chopra; Karl Urban; Ismael Cruz Córdova; Safia Oakley-Green; Temuera Morrison
- Cinematography: Greg Baldi
- Edited by: Lisa Lassek
- Music by: Henry Jackman
- Production companies: AGBO; Cinestar Pictures; Big Indie Pictures; Purple Pebble Pictures
- Distributed by: Amazon MGM Studios (via Prime Video)
- Release dates: February 17, 2026 (TCL Chinese Theater); February 25, 2026 (Prime Video)
- Running time: 103 minutes
- Countries: United States; India
- Language: English

The Bluff is a 2026 swashbuckler action thriller film directed by Frank E. Flowers, written by Flowers and Joe Ballarini, and starring Priyanka Chopra, Karl Urban, Ismael Cruz Córdova, Safia Oakley-Green, Vedanten Naidoo and Temuera Morrison. In the 19th century, a retired Caribbean pirate living a tranquil life on a remote island must protect her family from a band of vicious buccaneers led by an old enemy who arrive on her island to claim the bounty on her head. It is produced by AGBO, Cinestar Pictures, and Purple Pebble Pictures. It was released on Amazon Prime Video on February 25, 2026.

== Plot ==
Former pirate Ercell Bodden lives a quiet life on Cayman Brac with her disabled son Isaac and sister-in-law Elizabeth, who are unaware of her past. Ercell waits for her sea captain husband T.H. to return, his ship overdue by 59 days.

Pirate Connor arrives at Cayman Brac in search of Ercell. Ercell had been captured by Connor as a teenager and in order to survive joined his crew and became the notorious pirate Bloody Mary and Connor's lover before betraying him and stealing his cache of gold. Connor's men kill most of the island's defenders including Elizabeth's fiancée but Ercell manages to escape into the jungle with Isaac and Elizabeth. After a brief confrontation, Connor tells her that they have her husband in custody. Ercell leads Isaac and Elizabeth to The Bluff and a hidden network of caves which she has turned into a hideout. She reveals to Isaac and Elizabeth her past as a pirate and shows them the cache of gold before she heads out alone to rescue her husband.

Ercell infiltrates Connor's camp and locates T.H. but cannot free him. She confronts Connor and his men in the open and demands her husband's release in exchange for the gold, which she had brought with her. However the exchange goes awry and T.H. is killed and the gold is blown up, but Ercell manages to escape. Despite the loss of the gold Connor reassures his surviving men that if they capture Ercell they can turn her in for a pardon that will clear their names and give them back their freedom.

Connor and his men track Ercell to the caves but with Isaac and Elizabeth's help she kills all of them by using the darkness and traps she had set up. Now alone, Connor suggests to Ercell that they settle their conflict outside in the light "like buccaneers". Ercell meets Connor on top of The Bluff and they duel with swords; Connor manages to overpower Ercell but Elizabeth shoots him before he can kill her. Ercell stabs Connor with her sword, killing him. Ercell reveals to Elizabeth that her real name is Mariam while Isaac discovers that Ercell had stashed some of the gold away on a sailboat. As the surviving residents of Cayman Brac come out of hiding, a British fleet arrives on the horizon.

== Cast ==
- Priyanka Chopra as Ercell Bodden aka Mariam, a pirate known as "Bloody Mary" who was formerly an East India Company slave.
- Karl Urban as Captain Francisco Connor, a pirate with a deep rooted grudge against Ercell.
- Ismael Cruz Córdova as Theodor H. Bodden aka "T.H.", Ercell's husband and a sailor.
- Safia Oakley-Green as Elizabeth "Lizzy" Bodden, Ercell's sister-in-law.
- Vedanten Naidoo as Isaac Bodden, Ercell and T.H 's disabled son.
- Temuera Morrison as Lee, a Quartermaster and Connor's second in command.
- David Field as Pastor Bradley, pastor of Cayman Brac's Church who was formerly a pirate aligned with Ercell.
- Greg Hatton as Scout, a pirate and Connor's third-in-command
- Pacharo Mzembe as Chien, a pirate
- Gideon Mzembe as Lupe, a pirate and Chien's friend
- Zack Morris as Weston, Elizabeth's fiancee.
- Gary Beadle as Custode Drayton, the overseer of Cayman Brac.

== Production ==
In February 2021, it was announced that Frank E. Flowers would direct The Bluff, written by Joe Ballarini and Flowers, and to star Zoe Saldaña in the lead role. Netflix would distribute.

In January 2024, Priyanka Chopra signed on to replace Saldaña in the lead role, though Saldaña remained on the project as an executive producer. In March 2024, Amazon MGM Studios acquired distribution rights and Karl Urban joined the cast. In May, Ismael Cruz Córdova, Safia Oakley-Green and Vedanten Naidoo joined the cast. In August 2024, Temuera Morrison, Zack Morris, David Field, Pacharo Mzembe and Gideon Mzembe joined the cast.

The film is produced by Chopra, the Russo brothers, Angela Russo-Otstot, Michael Disco, Cisely Saldana, and Mariel Saldana, and executive produced by Flowers, Ballarini, Zoe Saldana, Chris Castaldi, Ari Costa, Kassee Whiting, and Thorsten Schumacher.

=== Filming ===
Principal photography began in June 2024 in Australia and concluded in early August 2024. Though it was filmed in Australia, the film is set in the Cayman Islands.

=== Music ===
Henry Jackman composed the score for the film.

== Release ==
The Bluff had its world premiere at the TCL Chinese Theater on February 17, 2026, and was released on Amazon Prime Video on February 25, 2026.

== Reception ==
=== Viewership ===
Following its release on Amazon Prime Video, The Bluff received moderate attention from global audiences and was noted for its action sequences and Priyanka Chopra's performance. The film was reported to have performed well on streaming platforms in multiple regions, particularly in India and the United States.

=== Critical response ===
On the review aggregator website Rotten Tomatoes, 55% of 53 critics' reviews are positive, with an average rating of 5.6/10. The website's consensus reads: "A brutally efficient yet emotionally hollow swashbuckler, The Bluff's blood-soaked action never quite makes up for it charmless sense of adventure." Metacritic, which uses a weighted average, assigned the film a score of 61 out of 100, based on eight critics, indicating "generally favorable" reviews.

Simon Abrams of RogerEbert.com gave 2.5 stars out of 4 and stated that "The Bluff exemplifies a very enjoyable type of nostalgia-bait, even if it's never as good as its elevator pitch." Owen Myers writing for The Guardian rated it 3/5 stars and writes in his review that "Chopra Jonas gamely commits to the pulpiness of The Bluff, even as it doesn't ask much of her beyond its impressive action sequences and a few tart one-liners."
