= Football, Feminism and You =

- Community episode
- Episode no.: Season 1 Episode 6
- Directed by: Joe Russo
- Written by: Hilary Winston
- Production code: 103
- Original air date: October 22, 2009

Guest appearances
- Jim Rash as Dean Craig Pelton; Charlotte Newhouse as Professor Baker

Episode chronology
← Previous "Advanced Criminal Law"	Next → "Introduction to Statistics"
- Community season 1

"Football, Feminism and You" is the sixth episode of the first season of the American comedy television series Community. It aired in the United States on NBC on October 22, 2009. The episode centers on Troy (Donald Glover) and his career playing football at Greendale Community College, while the B storyline concerns Britta (Gillian Jacobs) and her difficulty befriending other women. Pierce (Chevy Chase) works with Dean Pelton (Jim Rash) to create the school's mascot. The episode was watched by 5.18 million viewers upon its premiere and received polarized reviews.

== Plot ==
Dean Pelton (Jim Rash) is trying to boost interest in Greendale's football team, which has recently been renamed the "Greendale Human Beings." Aware that Troy (Donald Glover) was a star football player in high school but suffered an injury preventing him from going further, he attempts to convince Troy to join the team, but Annie (Alison Brie) objects, believing Troy has a better future. Pierce (Chevy Chase) offers to help Dean Pelton to redesign the school mascot to reflect the name change. Through many attempts, Pierce and the dean realize that the only acceptable mascot is one free of race, gender, or other identification and end up creating a vaguely human-shaped mascot wrapped entirely in white gauze to disguise any discernibly human characteristics.

Jeff (Joel McHale) later discovers posters and flyers for Greendale with his photogenic face front and center. Worried that these flyers would damage his professional reputation, he confronts Dean Pelton, who blackmails him, promising not to send out the flyers if he can convince Troy to join the football team. Jeff succeeds in doing so behind Annie's back. Annie later observes Troy slipping back into his pre-college jock ways such as being late for class and being lax on homework. She discovers he has rejoined the football team and realizes that Jeff convinced him to do so. When confronted, Jeff counters that Annie is trying to direct Troy on the path that she wants him to be on; Annie takes the comment too hard, but later is cheered up in the bathroom by Britta (Gillian Jacobs). At a pep rally before his first game, Troy tells Jeff that the accident that ended his first football career and cost him his scholarship was not an accident: Troy could not take the pressure of being the star player and injured himself on purpose. Since there is no pressure to succeed at Greendale, Troy now genuinely enjoys playing football. Jeff and Annie later make up for interfering in each other's lives.

Meanwhile, Shirley (Yvette Nicole Brown) is upset when Britta doesn't join her on a bathroom break and later insulted when Britta does join her but ridicules her desire to take her mother to get a makeover on feminist grounds. Shirley insists that the time women share in the bathroom together is to support each other and that from now on Britta can "pee alone." Britta realizes that she has never had support in such bathroom meetings and is there to support Annie in a bathroom meeting after Jeff's accusation. Shirley walks in and praises Britta for her success.

== Analysis ==
Jeff's role is limited, as in the previous episode, giving the show more of an ensemble cast feel. The episode gives further background to other characters before they began Greendale. Annie realizes that she and Troy have changed since high school. Troy was previously portrayed as a jock, but can now be seen as someone scared of the pressures of transitioning into adulthood. This contributes to development in Troy's character which leads to him being portrayed as less of a jock, allowing him to bond with Abed. Meanwhile, Britta becomes more pragmatic under Shirley's influence. Sean Gandert of Paste remarked that Community often associates pragmatism with maturity and adulthood.

"Football, Feminism and You" was originally scheduled as the third episode to air, between "Spanish 101" and "Introduction to Film". The "human being" mascot introduced in the episode recurs in later episodes. Troy suggests to Jeff that he take a pottery class, which he does in the later season 1 episode "Beginner Pottery". Gandert found that the show has a "newfound self-awareness" beginning in this episode, with Abed making multiple meta-jokes.

== Reception ==
Upon its first broadcast in the United States, an estimated 5.18 million viewers watched the episode.

=== Critical reception ===
John Young of Entertainment Weekly found the episode the best so far, praising Jeff and Troy's dialogue on the football field in particular. Gandert reviewed that the episode was not as funny as previous episodes, but one of the most well-written. Gandert found the narrative "nimbly ducks and weaves" across the multiple storylines. Eric Hochberger of TV Fanatic praised the episode for using Troy as the lead and giving Jeff a more minor role, as "taking advantage of the rest of this amazing cast proves the show can be just as funny and lead to more unique plotlines".

However, the episode garnered a B− rating in The A.V. Club, with Emily VanDerWerff criticizing that the episode reiterates established points from previous episodes, following the episode airing out of the original order. She highlighted Annie's crush on Troy and Britta and Jeff's sexual tension as aspects that made more sense to establish earlier. However, she praised the human being as "odd and amusing". Jonah Krakow of IGN found it a poor episode, rating it 6.5 out of 10. Krakow criticized that Jeff does not contribute much to the episode, but praised Glover's acting and Troy's high school football rap.

In 2018, Thrillist's Tyler McCarthy ranked "Football, Feminism and You" as the 19th-best episode of Community. In 2019, Aron Garst of GamesRadar+ ranked it 15th-best. In 2020, Joe Matar of Den of Geek found it one of the best early episodes of Community.
