= Haven (film) =

- Theatrical release poster
- Directed by: Frank E. Flowers
- Written by: Frank E. Flowers
- Produced by: Robbie Brenner; Bob Yari
- Starring: Orlando Bloom; Zoë Saldaña; Victor Rasuk; Bill Paxton; Stephen Dillane; Anthony Mackie
- Cinematography: Michael Bernard
- Edited by: Peter Christelis
- Music by: Heitor Pereira
- Distributed by: Haven Distribution; Freestyle Releasing
- Release dates: September 11, 2004 (Toronto Film Festival); September 15, 2006 (United States)
- Running time: 99 minutes
- Country: United States
- Language: English

Haven is a 2004 feature film set in the Cayman Islands, a British offshore financial centre. The film premiered at the Toronto International Film Festival in 2004. It is written and directed by native Caymanian Frank E. Flowers and filmed entirely in the 100-square-mile (260 km^{2}) West Indian dependency and has an ensemble cast, including Orlando Bloom, Zoë Saldaña, Bill Paxton, Bobby Cannavale and Anthony Mackie.

In this ensemble film, seemingly unconnected lives intersect, resulting in a violent chain of events that turns tranquility into chaos. It was released in limited theaters in the United States on September 15, 2006.

The film's tagline was "Can love survive the fall of paradise?"

== Plot ==
The corrupt and greedy businessman Carl Ridley is running from the government, with his 18-year-old daughter Pippa in tow. Pippa is not happy to leave her friends and comfortable life in Miami for the Cayman Islands.

Arriving in the islands, Ridley is preoccupied. Banks are rapidly closing and he must find a clean place to store his stolen money. Meanwhile, Pippa finds native Caymanian Fritz sleeping off a late night in her bed. He flees out the window, leaving his wallet behind. She later finds Fritz on the beach to return his wallet and befriends him, in spite of his ridiculous come-on attempts.

Fritz is yearning to show Pippi the island, including its wild parties. But he owes money to island gang leader Richie Ritch, and when he peeks in on Pippa's father unwrapping a massive amount of cash that he had taped around his torso, Fritz begins scheming. Pippa is completely unaware that she is leading her father into even more trouble than he had in the United States.

A parallel storyline involves Cayman native Sky. He is in love with Andrea, the daughter of his boss Mr. Sterling, a very influential person in the island. But for an unknown reason, Andrea's brother Hammer despises Shy. To protect their secret affair, whenever Shy visits Andrea at home his good friend Kimo watches the house in case Andrea's father arrives.

On Andrea's 18th birthday Shy visits her house and has sex with her, but Kimo falls asleep so fails to warn him of Sterling's arrival. Shy escapes out the window, but not without being identified by Hammer. Later on, to avenge his sister's lost womanhood, he attacks Shy with acid, leaving his face permanently scarred. Hammer is sent to jail for four months.

Both physically and emotionally scarred, Shy becomes a recluse. Andrea is emotionally broken and gives in to drugs and sex. Shy has his friend Patrick, the son of Mr. Allen (Ridley's lawyer), take him to Richie's birthday party to see her.

Finding Andrea in the bathroom having sex with a stranger, Sky runs into the front yard and vomits. She runs after him but he pushes her away knowing that she is high. Hammer sees Shy and begins to beat him up with help from his friends. Shy finally breaks free and runs down the street as Hammer curses at him, telling him to stay away.

Meanwhile, at the same party, Fritz gets pulled in to see Richie while Pippa talks to some other white girls doing drugs. Upset after smoking some laced pot, she finds Fritz and demands that he take her home. Having just told Richie to go to her home to steal the cash, he instead takes her to Mr. Sterling's yacht.

As they sit down inside, they find that the alarm has been set off; the police arrive shortly and arrest both of them. Pippa is taken to the police station, while Fritz is transported to a laundromat. There, a local cop who knows him delivers a lecture and a beating for acting disobediently throughout his life.

After his own beating, Shy obtains a gun and returns to the party to find Hammer. After firing the gun to clear out the party, he corners him and explains what a mess Hammer has made of his own sister's life. Sky says that he will spare Hammer's life so that he can watch the trouble that he has caused in Andrea's life. Hammer replies that he would rather see Andrea become a whore than be with Shy. Enraged, Shy pulls the trigger. Shocked by what he has done, he apologizes and runs off.

Over the next few hours, Andrea asks Patrick to take her to find Shy. He is disgusted with her and kicks her out of his car, but tells her that he is at the docks. When Andrea finds him, she expresses her desire to be with him, regardless of others' feelings. However, when he confesses to killing her brother, she leaves in disgust, forgetting her shoes in her hurry.

When Allen and Ridley go to the police station the next morning, Ridley soon realizes that he has been betrayed and is taken into custody by the FBI. When Allen goes home to retrieve the money that he believes he tricked Ridley into leaving in his safe, he discovers that the bag contains only sand and a conch shell. At her condo, Pippa finds the million dollars under her mattress.

In the final scenes, Andrea prepares for Hammer's funeral with her father, Kimo comforts Shy's mother, and Shy sits on the dock where Andrea left him. He then gets into his boat, cuts the rope and motors away, throwing the gun into the water.

== Cast ==
- Orlando Bloom as "Shy"
- Zoë Saldaña as Andrea
- Victor Rasuk as Fritz
- Bill Paxton as Carl Ridley
- Stephen Dillane as Mr. Allen
- Razaaq Adoti as Richie Rich
- Agnes Bruckner as Pippa Ridley
- Joy Bryant as Sheila
- Bobby Cannavale as Lieutenant
- Robert Wisdom as Mr. Sterling
- Lee Ingleby as Patrick
- Anthony Mackie as "Hammer"
- Sarah Carter as Chanel
- Ky-Mani Marley as John "The Baptist"
- Jake Weber as Officer Powell
- Mpho Koaho as Kimo
- Santiago Cabrera as Gene
- Rachel Miner as Eva
- Peter O'Meara as Officer Franklin
- Serena Scott Thomas as Mrs. Allen

== Reception ==
On the review aggregator website Rotten Tomatoes, 15% of 61 critics' reviews are positive. The website's consensus reads: "The plot's gratuitously nonlinear structure only ends up confusing viewers of this island thriller."
