= The Whisper Man =

2026 film by James Ashcroft

- Release poster
- Directed by: James Ashcroft
- Screenplay by: Ben Jacoby; Chase Palmer
- Based on: The Whisper Man by Alex North
- Produced by: Anthony Russo Joe Russo; Angela Russo-Otstot; Michael Disco
- Starring: Robert De Niro; Michelle Monaghan; Adam Scott
- Cinematography: Peter Deming
- Edited by: Christopher Tellefsen
- Music by: Colin Stetson
- Production company: AGBO
- Distributed by: Netflix
- Release date: August 28, 2026
- Running time: 114 minutes
- Country: United States
- Language: English
- Budget: $50 million

The Whisper Man is a 2026 American crime thriller film directed by James Ashcroft and written by Ben Jacoby and Chase Palmer. It is based on the novel of the same name by Alex North and stars Robert De Niro, Michelle Monaghan, and Adam Scott.

The film's plot follows recently widowed novelist Tom Kennedy and his young son Jake, who move to the town of Garretton as police investigate a child abduction apparently connected to an infamous serial killer known as the Whisper Man. When Jake is abducted, Tom is drawn into the investigation alongside his estranged father, the detective who originally captured the killer.

The film was released on August 28, 2026, by Netflix and received mixed reviews from critics.

== Plot ==
In 2026, Garretton Detective Amanda Beck discovers the body of a boy with a shirt wrapped around his head while searching for another missing child, Neil Spencer. The staging emulates serial killer Frank Carter, known as the Whisper Man, who murdered boys in the 1990s before being captured by Detective Peter Willis. Frank whispered to his victims and recorded messages designed to torment their grieving families. Amanda seeks advice from the retired Peter, but he refuses to speak with Frank, who will speak only to him. A recording of the Whisper Man speaking to Neil is soon discovered.

Recently widowed novelist Tom Kennedy moves to Garretton, his wife's hometown, with his young son Jake to start a new life. Jake has an imaginary friend, a young girl in a blue sweater, and avoids making friends since his mother's death. Tom tells him about his own beloved childhood imaginary friend, Mr Night, who visited before he slept and kissed his forehead. One night, Tom catches Jake reciting the Whisper Man rhyme at the front door as a hand reaches through the letter box, though no one is outside. The following day, he discovers a man in the basement, who flees. That night, Tom gets drunk and loses his temper when Jake says his imaginary friend is afraid of "the boy in the floor", and tells him to grow up. Jake is abducted soon after. Desperate, Tom contacts Peter, his estranged father, and asks him to help.

Peter joins Amanda's investigation, while Tom learns that the house's previous tenant, Dominic Barnett, was Frank's accomplice. After Neil's body is found, Peter finally agrees to meet with Frank. Frank denies involvement and taunts Peter that Tom's detective novels are an attempt to emulate Peter after their troubled relationship.

While reviewing frequent prison visitors, Peter identifies Norman Collins, who collects serial-killer memorabilia, but has an alibi for the abductions. Amanda and Peter remain suspicious that he has been communicating with Frank. A recording of Jake is then delivered in which he laments that his father did not believe him. Peter later tells Tom that he was absent from his life because of his alcoholism, brought on by his police work, but that he visited Tom at night and kissed his forehead, revealing that Peter was Mr Night.

With time running out, Tom follows Norman and recognizes him as the man from his basement. He and Peter search the basement and discover "the boy in the floor", the skeletal remains of Frank's sixth victim, alongside Barnett's remains. Amanda and Peter confront Norman and establish that he introduced the copycat killer to Frank and murdered Barnett after being mocked by him. Norman kills himself to avoid prison.

Recalling Frank's remarks, Peter realizes the killer is Frank's son, Francis Jr., attempting to emulate his absent father. Amanda visits the home of Dr. Sharmatz, Francis Jr.'s childhood counsellor. She suspects the inhabitant is Francis Jr. and discovers Sharmatz's decomposing body upstairs. Jake's imaginary friend instructs him to scream to alert Amanda, but before she can reach him, Francis Jr. stabs her, seizes Jake, and escapes to Tom's house. Meanwhile, Peter realizes Frank covered his victims' faces so he could imagine strangling his own son. He offers to bring Francis Jr. to him in exchange for revealing their plan to kill Jake in Tom's basement. Tom and Peter arrive at the house, confront Francis Jr., and rescue Jake, but Peter is fatally stabbed. Tom and Peter reconcile before he dies. Francis Jr. pursues Jake into the attic, where he falls through a damaged floorboard and is left incapacitated.

Some time later, Amanda receives a letter from Frank thanking her and Peter for what they have done. In prison, Frank is escorted into Francis Jr.'s cell and strangles him.

At home, Jake asks to play with other children, overcoming his trauma. While looking through photographs of his wife, Tom discovers one of her as a young girl wearing a blue sweater.

== Cast ==
- Robert De Niro as Peter Willis
- Michelle Monaghan as Amanda Beck
- Adam Scott as Tom Kennedy
- Hamish Linklater as Norman Collins
- Owen Teague as Francis Carter Jr.
- Michael Keaton as Frank Carter
- Acston Luca Porto as Jake Kennedy
- Will Brill as Sgt. John Dyson
- Exavier Montanez as Neil Spencer
- Robert Clohessy as Victor Tyler
- Aniela Zeig as little girl

== Production ==
Alex North's thriller novel The Whisper Man was published by Celadon Books on June 14, 2019. The Russo brothers, through their production company AGBO, optioned the film rights in 2018, nearly a year before the novel was published. In April 2022, it was reported that Netflix had joined the project. In April 2023, it was reported that James Ashcroft would be directing the film, with Ben Jacoby and Chase Palmer adapting the script.

In February 2025, it was announced that the crime thriller film was in development, with Robert De Niro to star. In March, Michelle Monaghan and Adam Scott joined the cast. Principal photography began on April 7, 2025, in and around Plainfield, New Jersey. In April, Michael Keaton, John Carroll Lynch, Hamish Linklater, Owen Teague, and Acston Luca Porto joined the cast. Filming concluded on June 4, 2025. The Russo brothers, Angela Russo-Otstot, and Michael Disco are producing, with Kassee Whiting and Marcus Viscidi serving as executive producers.

== Release ==
The Whisper Man was released on Netflix on August 28, 2026.

== Music ==
The original score was composed by Colin Stetson and released by Netflix Music, on August 28, 2026. It consists of 19 original tracks.

== Reception ==
On the review aggregator website Rotten Tomatoes, 45% of 83 critics' reviews are positive, with an average rating of 5/10. The website's consensus reads: "Assembling an impressive cast to go through the motions, The Whisper Man is reasonably creepy but could've stood to crank up the fresh ideas and genuine tension by a few more decibels." Metacritic, which uses a weighted average, assigned the film a score of 52 out of 100, based on 19 critics, indicating "mixed or average" reviews.
