= Angela Russo-Otstot =

American screenwriter and film producer

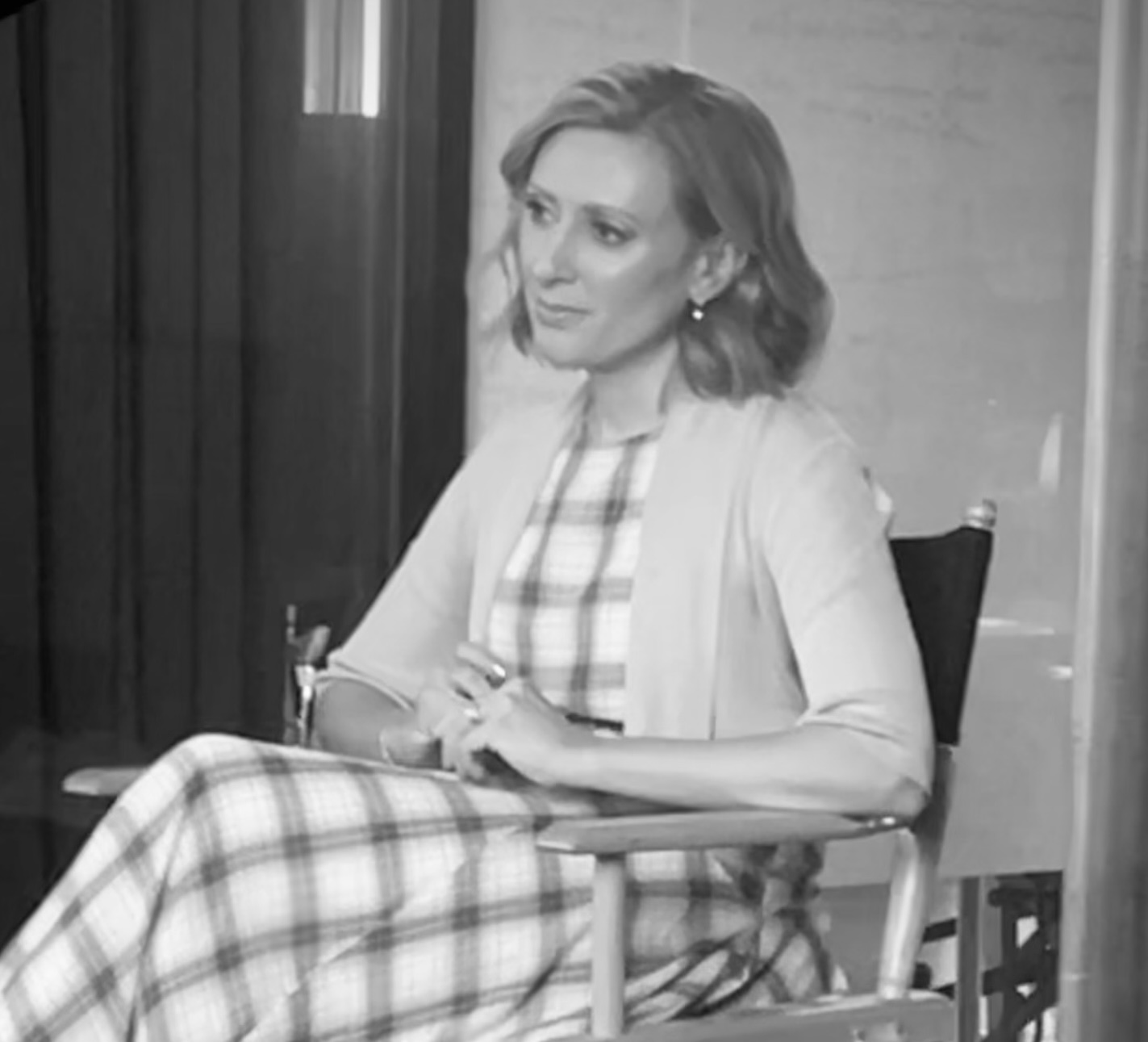
- Born: Angela Russo; 1978 (age 47–48); Cleveland, Ohio
- Education: Syracuse University
- Occupations: Screenwriter, producer
- Title: Chief Creative Officer, AGBO
- Father: Basil Russo
- Relatives: Anthony Russo and Joe Russo (brothers)

Angela Russo-Otstot (born 1978) is an American screenwriter and film producer. She is the chief creative officer (CCO) at AGBO, and is also known for her collaboration with her brothers, directors Anthony and Joe Russo. She co-wrote the film Cherry (2021), produced the films Extraction 2 (2023) and The Electric State (2025), and executive produced the Prime Video television series Citadel and its spinoffs.

== Early life and education ==
Russo-Otstot was born in Cleveland, Ohio. She is the daughter of Patricia Gallupoli and attorney and former judge Basil Russo, whose families emigrated from Sicily and Abruzzo. She is the sister of filmmakers Anthony and Joe Russo, commonly known as the Russo brothers. While in high school, she and her mother cooked meals for the crew of her brothers' first film, Pieces. She studied theater and acting at Syracuse University, after which she studied the Meisner acting technique for two years at the William Esper Studio.

== Career ==
After completing her studies, Russo-Otstot began her career as a writer. She sold a pilot to HBO when she was 25 years old, and went on to write for FX's The Shield and ABC's V. She also taught screenwriting and playwriting at Case Western Reserve University and the Cleveland Institute of Art. During that time, her brothers recruited her to join AGBO. In 2017, she joined AGBO as senior vice president of the story department under Christopher Markus and Stephen McFeely, and developed Netflix's Extraction and A24's Everything Everywhere All At Once, which won seven Academy Awards, including Best Picture. Along with Jessica Goldberg, she co-wrote Apple TV+'s Cherry, which was released in early 2021. In November 2022, she was promoted from president of creative to chief creative officer at AGBO. She was an executive producer for The Gray Man (Netflix, 2022), Citadel (Amazon Prime Video, 2023), Extraction 2 (Netflix, 2023), and The Electric State (Netflix, 2025). She is one of the producers of the upcoming Netflix film The Whisper Man, set to star Robert De Niro.

Through AGBO's "Gozie AGBO" banner, she has also led investment in emerging voices via independent films such as the IFC film Relic, named a Top 10 Independent Film of 2020 by the National Board of Review, , All Fun and Games which was distributed by Vertical. , and The Legend of Ochi distributed by A24.

She has made cameo appearances in some of her brothers' productions, including Captain America: The Winter Soldier, and in two episodes of Arrested Development.

In 2021, Russo-Otstot received an honorary doctor of art degree from the Cleveland Institute of Art, along with her brothers, in recognition of their contributions to film, television, and their hometown of Cleveland. Russo-Otstot was a speaker at the 2024 Produced By Conference presented by the Producers Guild of America, the Variety & Adobe Future of AI Filmmaking panel at the 2025 Sundance Film Festival, the Variety Entertainment Summit at CES, and at the Sands Film Festival.

She runs the Russo Brothers Italian American Filmmaker Forum, which was founded in 2016 and has helped fund the creation of 47 films. She also runs other AGBO initiatives that support emerging filmmakers, including No Sleep 'til Film Fest, a short film festival that launched in 2021, and the AGBO Fellowship, an annual scholarship and mentorship for Slamdance Film Festival participants.

== Filmography ==
=== Filmmaking credits ===
==== Television ====
Television credits
Year	Title	Writer	Executive Producer	Notes
2006	E-Ring	Yes	No	6 episodes
2007	Day Break	Yes	No	1 episode
2008	The Shield	Yes	No	2 episodes
2009	Trust Me	Yes	Co-producer	Wrote 2 episodes; co-produced 1 episode
2009-2010	V	Yes	Co-producer	Wrote 2 episodes; co-produced 11 episodes
2023	Citadel	Yes	Yes	Wrote 1 episode; executive-produced 6 episodes
2024	Citadel: Diana	No	Yes	6 episodes
2024	Citadel: Honey Bunny	No	Yes	6 episodes
TBA	Mercenary: An Extraction Series	No	Yes	

==== Film ====
Film credits
Year	Title	Writer	Producer
2020	Relic	No	Executive
2020	Extraction	No	Executive
2021	Cherry	Yes	Executive
2022	The Gray Man	No	Executive
2023	All Fun and Games	No	Yes
2023	Extraction 2	No	Yes
2025	The Electric State	No	Yes
2025	The Legend of Ochi	No	Executive
2026	The Bluff	No	Yes
2026	The Whisper Man	No	Yes
2027	John Rambo	No	Yes
TBA	Untitles Free Willy Reboot	No	Yes

=== Acting credits ===
==== Television ====
Television acting credits
Year	Title	Role	Notes
2004	LAX	Lily	3 episodes
2004	Arrested Development	Teacher	2 episodes

==== Film ====
Film acting credits
Year	Title	Role
2002	Welcome to Collinwood	Arguing woman
2014	Captain America: The Winter Soldier	Garcia
2022	The Gray Man	C.I.A. Tech
