= Advanced Criminal Law =

- Community episode
- Episode no.: Season 1 Episode 5
- Directed by: Joe Russo
- Written by: Andrew Guest
- Production code: 105
- Original air date: October 15, 2009

Guest appearances
- John Oliver as Dr. Ian Duncan; Jim Rash as Dean Craig Pelton; Richard Erdman as Leonard; Erik Charles Nielsen as Garrett; Dino Stamatopoulos as Star-Burns

Episode chronology
← Previous "Social Psychology"	Next → "Football, Feminism and You"
- Community season 1

"Advanced Criminal Law" is the fifth episode of the first season of the American comedy television series Community. It aired in the United States on NBC on October 15, 2009. The episode follows Jeff (Joel McHale) attempting to help Britta (Gillian Jacobs) after she confesses to cheating on a Spanish test, as Pierce (Chevy Chase) helps Annie (Alison Brie) by composing a school song and Abed (Danny Pudi) attempts to convince Troy (Donald Glover) that he is an alien. It garnered 5.01 million viewers in its first broadcast and was met with mixed critical reception.

== Plot ==
In Spanish class, Chang (Ken Jeong) announces that he has discovered a cheat sheet somebody used on a test, and all members of the class will score 0 on the test unless the cheater confesses within a day. In the study room, the group accuse each other of being the culprit but reach no conclusion. The following day, Britta confesses in class as the culprit. She is sent to a tribunal held at the swimming pool with the Dean (Jim Rash), Chang, and Dr. Duncan (John Oliver), with Jeff acting as her counsel. Britta initially recants her confession, but then confesses again. After consulting with Britta during a recess, Jeff asks to plead insanity for his client, arguing that she is crazy because she went out of her way to fail due to lack of self-confidence. The Dean and Duncan vote for Britta to receive no punishment so long as she attends weekly psychological evaluations by Duncan, who has been looking for ways to attempt to seduce Britta.

Annie is stressed over a composer she has hired to design a new school song for an unveiling of a statue of Luis Guzmán on the campus, so Pierce offers to write the song. He struggles to write, but says to Annie that things are going well. After eventually conceding that he exaggerated his previous musical experience, Annie delivers a motivational speech based on one her mother gave her about cheerleading. At the statue unveiling, Pierce performs the song he has written. The song is near-identical to the song "The Way It Is" by Bruce Hornsby and the Range, though Pierce seems unaware.

Troy has been telling Abed various obvious lies, including that he is Barack Obama's nephew. Abed believes him until Troy explains that he was joking. Abed finds this amusing and attempts to make jokes. Later, Troy overhears Abed making a "transmission" in which he reports his interactions with Troy, who becomes increasingly suspicious of him. In a storage closet, Troy observes Abed on a video call, ostensibly contacting a member of his alien species. Annoyed, Troy tells Abed that he does not believe him to be an alien and says all of his effort was freaking him out, deciding that they will not try to mess with each other from now on.

In the end tag, Abed and Troy attempt to fit as many pencils as they can in each other's mouths.

== Analysis ==
The episode was originally scheduled to air earlier in season one. Though posters of the Greendale Human Being are displayed in "Advanced Criminal Law", the character is not introduced until the following episode, "Football, Feminism and You". The recurring character Leonard (Richard Erdman) debuts in this episode, eventually making 53 appearances across all six seasons of Community.

== Reception ==
Upon its first broadcast in the United States, an estimated 5.01 million viewers watched the episode.

Emily VanDerWerff of The A.V. Club rated the episode a C+, criticizing it as the weakest episode of the series at that point. She praised the main storyline with Britta for "deepening" the previously undeveloped character, also enjoying the swimming pool setting and the character Duncan. However, VanDerWerff disliked Troy and Abed's storyline and Chang's exaggerated eccentricity. John Krakow of IGN reviewed the episode as 5.8 out of 10. Calling it "very flat and predictable", Krakow critiqued that the swimming pool setting "got old", the humor with Pierce's songwriting was repetitive and Troy and Abed's storyline had "no consequences". He later described it as "rock bottom" for the first season.

Paste's Sean Gandert praised the episode for developing the community college setting and making it seem unique, enjoying Chase's acting, but commenting that Troy and Abed's storyline lacked a "payoff". John Young of Entertainment Weekly found that the episode started "in a mild fog" but progressed to "a solid conclusion", praising the dialogue between Duncan and Chang, Abed making "his first deliberate joke" and Annie's motivational speech to Pierce.
