= Mosul (2019 action film) =

2019 film

- Film poster
- Directed by: Matthew Michael Carnahan
- Written by: Matthew Michael Carnahan
- Based on: "The Desperate Battle to Destroy ISIS" by Luke Mogelson
- Produced by: Anthony Russo Joe Russo; Mike Larocca; Jeremy Steckler; Dawn Ostroff
- Starring: Suhail Dabbach; Adam Bessa; Is'Haq Elias
- Cinematography: Mauro Fiore
- Edited by: Alex Rodriguez
- Music by: Henry Jackman
- Production companies: AGBO; Image Nation; Condé Nast Entertainment
- Distributed by: Netflix
- Release date: September 2019 (Venice)
- Running time: 101 minutes
- Country: United States
- Language: Iraqi Arabic

Mosul is a 2019 Arabic-language American war action film written and directed by Matthew Michael Carnahan. The film is based on the 2016 Battle of Mosul during War in Iraq, which saw Iraqi government forces and coalition allies defeat ISIS, who had controlled the city since June 2014.

The film premiered at the 2019 Venice Film Festival and released on Netflix on November 26, 2020.

== Plot ==
During the Battle of Mosul, three Iraqi policemen arrest ISIS drug smugglers. However, they are soon overrun by ISIS and run out of ammo while defending themselves inside a café building. One of the police officers, Kawa, a 21 year old Feyli Kurd recently enlisted as a police officer, loses his uncle during the gunfight. The Nineveh SWAT Team, while going on a mission of their own, find the stranded police officers and save them from the ISIS group, as well as execute the drug smugglers. The Nineveh SWAT Team, a police division made up of men native to Mosul who lost family members to ISIS and led by Commander Major Jasem, offers Kawa to join them since he lost his uncle to ISIS and is thus eligible to become part of their team. He accepts, while his partner, the other police officer named Jameel, offers to take Kawa's uncle's body for burial.

The SWAT team continue their mission. Kawa repeatedly asks about their mission objective but is always ignored. While resting inside an abandoned building, Kawa and Jasem notice Kawa's previous partner, Jameel, returning and signalling to an ISIS car bomber the location of the SWAT team. Tomahawk, one of the SWAT team members, dies during the bomb blast. Commander Jasem gives Tomahawk's axe to Kawa. As they take the body of their fallen SWAT member for burial, Kawa grows repeatedly frustrated as no one answers his questions and no one trusts him while Hooka accuses him of being a traitor's partner.

While crossing into the ISIS-held part of Mosul, the SWAT team and the surrounding civilians come under fire from ISIS gunmen shooting from a rooftop and Hooka is killed. As the SWAT team clear the rooftop and plan their next course of action, an explosive-laden drone targets one of the SWAT team's Humvees. A second explosive-laden drone is shot down by Iranian Special Forces operative Colonel Isfahani, who is commanding the Popular Mobilization Forces (PMF) in Mosul. He offers the SWAT team ammunition in exchange for cigarette cartons. As the SWAT men meet with the PMF and Jasem barters with Isfahani, Jasem realizes that one of the PMF's prisoners is Kawa's partner Jameel. Jameel explains that he was captured by the ISIS group and threatened with the assassination of his grandson in Michigan unless he informs them of the SWAT team's location. Tensions between the SWAT and the PMF rise rapidly when Jasem and Ishfahani argue on what to do with Jameel, but Kawa uses the axe he was given and kills Jameel, de-escalating the situation. Waleed then exchanges Hooka's hookah for an RPG with a single rocket, intending to attack an ISIS camp they've seen earlier from the rooftop.

As they leave, Commander Jasem explains to Kawa that his SWAT team have gone against his police superiors' orders to not undertake this mission; he begins to answer Kawa's repeated questions about the mission. However, Kawa stops him and informs him he does not want to know anymore and that he will just follow Jasem's commands. The SWAT team continue their mission and reach a roadblock, which forces them to fight outside their Humvees. Youness is accidentally killed by friendly fire, while Kawa is injured by a friendly fire grenade and his face disfigured which he covers with a balaclava. As the team proceed on foot and enter a building, Razak is killed in close quarter combat and Sinan sustains a stab wound.

The SWAT team proceed to attack the ISIS camp, losing Akram in the process to enemy fire. As they are securing the ISIS camp, Jasem, who has a habit of cleaning trash from any area he is in despite its destruction, accidentally triggers an ISIS booby trap and is killed. With the death of their commander, the SWAT team suffer great morale loss. However, Kawa succeeds in reminding them of their mission. Waleed leads the remainder of the SWAT group, now down to 6 members, into an apartment complex where he uses a spare key he had hidden in his shoe to open an apartment door. He kills an ISIS member who has taken Waleed's wife Hayat along with her daughter Dunya for forced marriage.

Kawa finally understands the objective of the SWAT mission, learning that the group had been carrying missions to liberate members of their families captured by ISIS. As he learns that Amir's son is close to their location, he asks how far.

== Cast ==
- Is'haq Elias as Waleed
- Suhail Dabbach as Major Jasem
- Hayat Kamille as Hayat
- Thaer Al-Shayei as Hooka
- Adam Bessa as Kawa Salah al-Faily
- Ahmad Elghanem as Sinan
- Waleed Elgadi as Colonel Kaveh Esfahani

== Production ==
The film was inspired by Luke Mogelson's article "The Desperate Battle to Destroy ISIS." as published in The New Yorker. and was shot in Marrakesh, Morocco.

== Reception ==
On Rotten Tomatoes, the film has an approval rating of 84% based on 32 reviews, with an average rating of 7.30/10. The site's critics consensus reads: "With a fresh perspective to balance the familiar Middle Eastern war violence, Mosul hits its targets forcefully." On Metacritic, the film has a weighted average score of 71 out of 100, based on 5 critics, indicating "generally favorable reviews". After high viewership in Europe and the Middle East, cast members began receiving death threats on social media from individuals claiming to be affiliated with ISIS.
