= Home Economics (Community) =

- Community episode
- Episode no.: Season 1 Episode 8
- Directed by: Anthony Russo
- Written by: Lauren Pomerantz
- Production code: 107
- Original air date: November 5, 2009

Guest appearances
- Eric Christian Olsen as Vaughn; Patton Oswalt as Male Nurse Jackie; Dominik Musiol as Pavel

Episode chronology
← Previous "Introduction to Statistics"	Next → "Debate 109"
- Community season 1

"Home Economics" is the eighth episode of the first season of the American comedy television series Community. It aired in the United States on NBC on November 5, 2009. The episode revolves around Jeff's (Joel McHale) living situation now that he no longer has the money he earned as a big-shot lawyer and the emotional aftermath of Britta (Gillian Jacobs) and Vaughn's (Eric Christian Olsen) breakup. It garnered 5.45 million viewers on its premiere and received positive critical reception.

== Plot ==
Ben Chang (Ken Jeong), the study group's Spanish instructor, notices Jeff (Joel McHale) sleeping in class and startles him awake. As the students file out, Troy (Donald Glover) asks Annie (Alison Brie) for advice on a good date activity for a girl he likes, not realizing that Annie has a crush on him. Annie, thinking that girl is her, instructs him on a very romantic evening for him and his new friend. Shirley (Yvette Nicole Brown) notices Annie's disappointment after she realizes Troy likes someone else, not her. Meanwhile, Britta (Gillian Jacobs) notices that Jeff looks less well-groomed than usual and begins to interrogate him about it, but he walks off when Vaughn (Eric Christian Olsen) walks up. Vaughn is cold to Britta after their recent breakup, telling her that she's toxic. Pierce (Chevy Chase) offers to talk to him and, despite Britta's explicit insistence against it, decides to persist.

Britta and Shirley notice Jeff bathing and brushing his teeth outside; Shirley realizes Jeff is living in his car. The group discusses Jeff's situation. Pierce tells Britta that he tried talking to Vaughn, but the only result is that Pierce is now the keyboardist in Vaughn's band. When Jeff walks in, Britta and Shirley confront Jeff about his living situation. Jeff claims that he has a minor issue with condo fees, and Abed (Danny Pudi) invites him to stay in his dorm room for the time being. Jeff declines.

Jeff shows Britta pictures of his old condo, particularly focusing on his handcrafted Italian faucets. After his car is towed, he ends up asking to crash in Abed's dorm. He finds Abed's cheerful acceptance of his low station in life infuriating, though Abed and Jeff later bond over cereal, television, and sad childhoods. Shirley witnesses Annie lending Troy a blanket, a family heirloom, for his picnic date. She insists that Annie tell him how she feels before Troy and his date Randi get closer. Meanwhile, Pierce and Vaughn's band are playing in the cafeteria. Vaughn starts singing lyrics about his breakup, naming Britta by name and calling her a bitch and a liar.

After the show, Britta confronts Pierce and Vaughn, who are practicing, but Vaughn ignores her. He then gets into an argument with Pierce over the song's authorship, throwing a tantrum and kicking Pierce out of the band, which Britta mistakes as Pierce having defended her. Annie continues instructing Troy on how to woo his date, preparing drinks and candles. Finally, as Troy is on his way to the date, she reaches her breaking point and shouts that she has to tell him something, then claims her appendix is bursting. He accompanies her to the health center, where it's confirmed that she doesn't have appendicitis. Troy cheerfully leaves, while the nurse (Patton Oswalt) suspects Annie may have some rare disease and insists she be quarantined.

Britta finds Abed and Jeff and observes that they missed Spanish class. She becomes concerned that perhaps leaving the material world behind wasn't good for Jeff and that rather than growing as a person he has become even more adolescent. Abed begs her to take him back, observing that their newfound friendship is good for Abed but bad for Jeff. Britta strides into Abed's dorm room and confronts Jeff, telling him that for him, material possessions are vital. Jeff is not interested, but she throws at him a paper bag containing the handcrafted Italian faucet she found by breaking into his condo. She tells him to get an apartment and install the faucet there to remind him that he is capable of materialism again.

Pierce walks up to Vaughn and reiterates that he's no longer in the band. He asks him to lay off Britta, and Vaughn agrees, getting on the stage to sing his newest song in which he insults Pierce instead. Pierce is at first taken aback, but then laughs and nudges the students in the audience, bragging that he's the one in the song. Annie runs up to Troy and his date on the lawn, still wearing a hospital gown, and takes a small step to assert herself, asking for the blanket back. Troy, bewildered, relinquishes it, and Annie defiantly tells Shirley, who had witnessed the event, that it was a big step for her. Shirley sympathizes.

Britta finds Jeff and notes that he is properly groomed again. Abed wanders up, and Jeff tells them both that he is staying in a motel and looking for apartments. Abed confirms to Jeff that he would've cheerfully let Jeff stay in his dorm room indefinitely had he wanted to.

In the end tag, Vaughn finds Pierce and a rapper, who previously accompanied his song against Pierce, practicing with lyrics insulting Vaughn. He swears revenge.

== Reception ==
Upon its first broadcast in the United States, an estimated 5.45 million viewers watched the episode.

Sean Gandert of Paste rated the episode 8.9 out of 10, praising the program's approach to continuity, in that the episode utilized past storylines but did not rely on them. Gandert saw the cast as "getting sharper with one-liners" and commented that the storylines resolved speedily. Jonah Krakow of IGN gave it 8 out of 10, reviewing that Pierce's storyline "utilized Chase's gift for physical comedy". Krakow found Jeff and Abed's comedy in the sundae bar scene "great" and praised Vaughn's songs, but saw Troy and Annie's storyline as the weakest. Emily VanDerWerff of The A.V. Club rated the episode B+, describing it as a "really solid half hour of laughs" and praising the dynamic between Annie and Troy.

Eric Hochberger of TV Fanatic praised the episode as "fantastic", reviewing that Abed was a breakout character and that his storyline with Jeff was "comedic bliss". Alan Sepinwall found the episode to be "solid" and use Jeff, Britta and Abed well, particularly the friendship between Britta and Jeff. John Young of Entertainment Weekly panned the episode, criticizing Jeff's breakdown as unrealistic, Vaughn as tiresome and the storyline with Annie and Troy as unfunny. Young also found the songs unamusing. Both Young and Hochberger were disappointed by Troy and Abed not featuring in the end tag.
