= Michael Disco =

American film producer

- Born: Vermont
- Education: Syracuse University
- Occupation: Film producer

Michael Disco is an American film producer and the president of film at AGBO. He produced The Flash, and is producing the upcoming films The Whisper Man and The Bluff. He was formerly an executive at New Line Cinema.

== Early life and education ==
Disco was born and raised in Vermont. He attended Syracuse University, graduating in 2000 with a bachelor's degree in policy studies.

== Career ==
In 2000, Disco began working as an intern to producer Jon Peters. That year, he started working at New Line Cinema in the marketing department, before becoming film executive Toby Emmerich's assistant. Disco spent nearly two decades with New Line, ultimately being named executive vice president of production. In 2010, he was named to The Hollywood Reporter Next Generation list of the film industry's top executives to watch under the age of 35. As a New Line executive, he was responsible for 34 films that earned $4.5 billion worldwide, including Hairspray, Valentine's Day, He's Just Not That into You, San Andreas, Rampage, Central Intelligence, The Disaster Artist, Game Night, and the Horrible Bosses franchise.

In 2019, Disco left New Line to transition into producing and to launch The Disco Factory, an independent production company. His first project there was The Sopranos prequel film The Many Saints of Newark, on which he served as an executive producer. In 2019, it was announced that he would be producing The Flash, starring Ezra Miller, written by John Francis Daley and Jonathan Goldstein, directed by Andy Muschietti, and released in 2023.

In 2023, Disco joined entertainment company AGBO as president of film, overseeing the creative and business strategy for the company's films. He is a producer on the upcoming films The Bluff, starring Priyanka Chopra and directed by Frank E. Flowers, The Whisper Man, starring Robert De Niro, John Rambo, directed by Jalmari Helander, and the sixth film in the Rambo franchise, and Tygo, a film in the Extraction universe set in South Korea and starring Don Lee, Lee Jin-wook and Lalisa Manobal.

== Filmography ==
Year	Title	Role	Notes
2006	Hoot	Co-producer	
2006	How to Eat Fried Worms	Co-producer	
2006	The Nativity Story	Co-executive producer	
2007	Fracture	Associate producer	
2007	Hairspray	Co-producer	
2008	Harold & Kumar Escape from Guantanamo Bay	Co-producer	
2008	Four Christmases	Executive producer	
2008	Journey to the Center of the Earth	Co-producer	
2009	He's Just Not That into You	Co-producer	
2010	Dear John	Associate producer	
2010	Valentine's Day	Executive producer	
2010	Going the Distance	Executive producer	
2011	Horrible Bosses	Executive producer	
2011	A Very Harold & Kumar 3D Christmas	Executive producer	
2011	New Year's Eve	Executive producer	
2012	Journey 2: The Mysterious Island	Executive producer	
2012	Rock of Ages	Executive producer	
2013	Jack the Giant Slayer	Executive producer	
2014	Tammy	Executive producer	
2014	Horrible Bosses 2	Executive producer	
2015	San Andreas	Executive producer	
2016	How to Be Single	Executive producer	
2016	Keanu	Executive producer	
2016	Central Intelligence	Executive producer	
2016	Collateral Beauty	Executive producer	
2017	Going in Style	Executive producer	
2017	The House	Executive producer	
2017	The Disaster Artist	Executive producer	
2018	Game Night	Executive producer	
2018	Rampage	Executive producer	
2018	Life of the Party	Executive producer	
2019	The Kitchen	Executive producer	
2020	Superintelligence	Executive producer	
2021	The Many Saints of Newark	Executive producer	
2023	The Flash	Producer	
2026	The Bluff	Producer	
2026	The Whisper Man	Producer	
TBA	John Rambo	Producer	
TBA	Untitled FBI Wedding Sting Comedy	Producer	
TBA	Tygo	Producer	
TBA	Untitled Free Willy reboot	Co-producer	
