= Harka (film) =

- Theatrical release poster
- Directed by: Lotfy Nathan
- Written by: Lotfy Nathan
- Produced by: Julie Viez; Lotfy Nathan; Alex Hughes; Riccardo Maddalosso; Eugene Kotlyarenko; Nicole Romano; Tariq Merhab; Maurice Fadida
- Starring: Adam Bessa; Salima Maatoug; Ikbal Harbi; Najib Allagui
- Cinematography: Maximilian Pittner
- Edited by: Sophie Corra; Thomas Niles
- Music by: Eli Keszler
- Production companies: Cinenovo; Spacemaker Productions; Anonymous Content; Beachside; Kodiak Pictures; Detailfilm; Wrong Men North; Tarantula; Cinetelefilms
- Distributed by: Dulac Distribution (France)
- Release dates: 19 May 2022 (Cannes); 2 November 2022 (France); 11 January 2023 (Luxembourg)
- Running time: 90 minutes
- Countries: France; Tunisia; Luxembourg; Belgium; Germany; United States
- Language: Arabic

Harka is a 2022 internationally co-produced drama film, written and directed by Lotfy Nathan, in his narrative directorial debut, inspired by Mohamed Bouazizi's self-immolation that sparked the Tunisian revolution and Arab Spring in 2010 and 2011. It stars Adam Bessa, Salima Maatoug, Ikbal Harbi and Najib Allagui.

It had its world premiere at the 2022 Cannes Film Festival on 19 May 2022, in the Un Certain Regard section, where lead actor Adam Bessa won the award for Best Performance. It was released theatrically in France by Dulac Distribution on 2 November 2022.

== Plot ==
A young Tunisian man dreams of a better life and sells contraband petrol on the black market. When his father dies, he is left to take care of his two sisters, with eviction from their home looming.

== Cast ==
- Adam Bessa as Ali
- Salima Maatoug as Alyssa
- Ikbal Harbi as Sarra
- Najib Allagui as Omar

== Production ==
In July 2021, it was announced Adam Bessa had joined the cast of the film, with Lotfy Nathan directing from a screenplay he wrote. The plot was inspired by Mohamed Bouazizi's self-immolation that sparked the Tunisian revolution and Arab Spring between 2010 and 2011. The title "Harka" is translated as "burn", and it is also a Tunisian slang for a migrant who crosses the Mediterranean illegally by boat.

=== Filming ===
Principal photography took place in Tunis and Sidi Bouzid in Tunisia. Harka was the first feature film to be shot in the city of Sidi Bouzid, where the Tunisian Revolution started. Filming took place in Tunisia during the COVID-19 pandemic. Although there were no official lockdowns in the country back then, a political crisis started a few weeks into the shoot and the army removed the government from power, provoking street protests. The film's cast and crew were caught in a demonstration while filming at a bus station. Director Lotfy Nathan comes from a documentary background and incorporated elements of what was happening on the streets at the time into Harka, even casting non-professionals actors in some of the key roles. A scene featuring a protest on the streets was filmed entirely with non-professionals.

== Release ==
The film had its world premiere at the 2022 Cannes Film Festival on 19 May 2022, in the Un Certain Regard section where lead actor Adam Bessa was awarded ex aequo the Best Performance Prize. Prior to, Dulac Distribution acquired French distribution rights to the film, and released it on theaters on 2 November 2022. It was released in Luxembourg on 11 January 2023.

== Reception ==
On the review aggregator website Rotten Tomatoes, 100% of the nine top 5 critics' reviews are positive.

== Awards and nominations ==
Year	Award / Film Festival	Category	Recipient(s)	Result
2022	Cannes Film Festival	Un Certain Regard	Lotfy Nathan	Nominated
2022	Cannes Film Festival	Un Certain Regard Award for Best Performance	Adam Bessa	Won
2022	Saint-Jean-de-Luz Film Festival	Best Male Performance	Adam Bessa	Won
2022	Red Sea International Film Festival	Best Feature Film	Lotfy Nathan	Nominated
2022	Red Sea International Film Festival	Yusr Award for Best Director	Lotfy Nathan	Won
2022	Red Sea International Film Festival	Best Actor	Adam Bessa	Won
2023	Lumière Awards	Best First Film	Lotfy Nathan	Nominated
2023	Lumière Awards	Best Male Revelation	Adam Bessa	Nominated
2023	Paris Film Critics Association	Best Young Actor	Adam Bessa	Nominated
