= Welcome to Collinwood =

- Theatrical release poster
- Directed by: Anthony Russo; Joe Russo
- Written by: Anthony Russo; Joe Russo
- Based on: I Soliti Ignoti by Suso Cecchi d'Amico; Mario Monicelli; Agenore Incrocci; Furio Scarpelli
- Produced by: George Clooney; Steven Soderbergh
- Starring: William H. Macy; Isaiah Washington; Sam Rockwell; Michael Jeter; Luis Guzmán; Patricia Clarkson; Andrew Davoli; George Clooney; Jennifer Esposito; Gabrielle Union
- Cinematography: Lisa Rinzler; Charles Minsky
- Edited by: Amy E. Duddleston
- Music by: Mark Mothersbaugh
- Production company: Section Eight
- Distributed by: Warner Bros. Pictures (United States and Canada); Kinowelt Filmverleih (Germany); Pandora Cinema (International)
- Release dates: May 24, 2002 (Cannes); October 18, 2002 (United States)
- Running time: 86 minutes
- Countries: United States; Germany
- Language: English
- Budget: $8–12 million
- Box office: $4.6 million

Welcome to Collinwood is a 2002 American caper comedy film written and directed by Anthony and Joe Russo and starring William H. Macy, Isaiah Washington, Sam Rockwell, Michael Jeter (in his last film to be released during his lifetime), Luis Guzmán, Patricia Clarkson, Andrew Davoli, George Clooney, Jennifer Esposito, and Gabrielle Union. It is a remake of the Oscar-nominated 1958 Italian film Big Deal on Madonna Street (I soliti ignoti) by Mario Monicelli. The screenplay concerns a group of small-time thieves and misfits from the Collinwood neighborhood of Cleveland, who attempt to carry out a major theft from a jeweller's apartment safe.

== Plot ==
Cosimo is arrested when he and Toto try to steal a car. In prison, he meets an old man who mentions a “Bellini” - a perfect heist - that he could not carry out because of a life sentence. Cosimo asks his girlfriend Rosalind to find someone willing to do prison time in exchange for money so that he can walk free and pull off the heist. Rosalind and Toto ask misfits Basil, Leon, Riley, who babysits his infant son while needing $1,000 to pay his own wife's jail fine, and Pero "Pepe" Mahalovic, a boxer who agrees to confess to Cosimo's crime for $16,000 but ends up being jailed alongside him. While inside, Pero gets Cosimo to say what the Bellini is before revealing that his own sentence was suspended, leaving Cosimo still in jail. Returning home, Pero is met by Rosalind and the other four demanding a refund. Pero says he used the $16,000 to pay off debts but will share the Bellini details. The six then decide to carry out the heist themselves.

The Bellini concerns a brick building on Chester converted from a flour factory into apartments and a jewelry store. The old man worked on the conversion and created a false wall between one apartment and the room with the jewelry store safe. Riley steals a video camera from a street market in order to get the combination by filming the jeweller opening the safe. After filming fails they hire Jerzy, a safecracker who uses a wheelchair, to teach them how to drill into the safe, whereupon Detective Babitch starts to keep a close eye on them. Then two maiden aunts with a maid named Carmela move into the long-vacant apartment, and so Leon and Basil pretend to accost Carmela while Pero comes to her "rescue" to secure a date in the hope of stealing her keys. Meanwhile, in prison, when a guard drops dead, Cosimo uses his uniform to escape. Cosimo confronts Pero and the others, who try to convince him that they can split the take equally, but he hits Rosalind for betraying him and threatens to kill anyone who tries to pull off “his” Bellini.

Rosalind becomes disheartened and leaves the group but Pero finds that he is falling for Carmela, who reveals that the aunts will be out of town for days. That same night Cosimo dies in a bus accident. Basil meets Leon's sister, Michelle, and they begin dating despite her saying that she wants “an honest man". After Babitch watches the group attend Cosimo's funeral Pero decides to bribe him in exchange for turning a blind eye while they do the heist, and gives Babitch the $16,000 which he has lied about spending.

On the night of the heist, Riley leaves his baby with Rosalind. En route to meet up at Pero's apartment, however, he gets his arm broken by the men he stole the camera from. He arrives with one arm in a cast and “high” from a bottleful of Vicodin. Leon, having found out about his sister's affair, arrives to confront Basil. Basil then reveals that he cannot go on the heist because he has now taken an honest job in order to be worthy of Michelle, and leaves. During the heist itself, Toto loses his pants, Pero bites off the tip of his tongue, and they find that their floor plans are out of date when they break through the wrong wall (into the kitchen) at 3 am. They realize there is not enough time left to reach and crack open the safe, but Toto finds $1,000 in a cookie jar and so they decide to heat some soup on the apartment stove so as to eat before leaving – whereupon the stove blows up. Later, the group is standing at the bus stop. Riley suggests that they should not see one another again, but just as he gets on the bus the other three decide to give Riley all of the $1,000 for his wife's jail fine. Leon heads home to apologize to his sister and tells Pero to let him know when he gets another Bellini, and before Pero also leaves Toto asks him about Carmela, and tells him that it is important to have someone to walk with, more so than money.

== Cast ==
- William H. Macy as Riley
- Isaiah Washington as Leon
- Sam Rockwell as Pero "Pepe" Mahalovic
- Michael Jeter as Toto
- Luis Guzmán as Cosimo
- Patricia Clarkson as Rosalind
- Andrew Davoli as Basil
- George Clooney as Jerzy
- David Warshofsky as Sergeant Babitch
- Jennifer Esposito as Carmela
- Gabrielle Union as Michelle
- Angela Russo-Otstot as Arguing Woman

== Release ==
Welcome to Collinwood was the closing night film of the Directors Fortnight at the 2002 Cannes Film Festival.

== Reception ==
=== Box office ===
Receiving only a limited release domestically, the film earned $378,650 in the United States and Canada, and $4,606,284 worldwide, against a production budget of $8–12 million.

=== Critical response ===
On Rotten Tomatoes 55% of critics have given the film a positive review based on 67 reviews, with an average rating of 5.88/10. The site's critics consensus reads, "Contains some funny moments, but it's still a very lightweight comedy." On Metacritic, the film has a weighted average score of 61 out of 100 based on 22 critics, indicating "generally favorable reviews".

Roger Ebert gave the film 2.5 out of 4 and asked if the problem was that he had seen the original, but says "I can see how someone might enjoy this movie, coming to it for the first time." Todd McCarthy for Variety said the film "generates agreeable feelings for its sweetly clueless characters along with a few decent laughs", praising the performances of the actors but criticizing the thin material.
