= Frank E. Flowers =

American film director

Frank Ewen Flowers Jr. (born 1979) is a Caymanian independent filmmaker, film director and screenwriter. He is the writer and director of the award-winning 2003 short film Swallow and the 2004 feature motion picture Haven, the first feature film to be entirely photographed on the island of Grand Cayman. Flowers is a graduate of the University of Southern California School of Cinema-Television (now the USC School of Cinematic Arts).

Flowers also co-wrote Metro Manila with director Sean Ellis. The film won an audience award at the Sundance Film Festival and was nominated for a BAFTA in 2014 after winning numerous British Independent Film Awards. In 2015, he was commissioned to script Shooting Stars about the teenage years of basketball legend LeBron James for Universal Studios. The film was produced by James, his partner Maverick Carter, alongside Academy Award nominees Rachel and Terence Winter. Flowers also co-wrote the Bob Marley: One Love biopic for director Reinaldo Marcus Green and is the co-writer and director of The Bluff, which was released by Amazon MGM Studios.

== Biography ==
Frank Ewen Flowers Jr. was born in 1979. He began working as a news cameraman for the Cayman Islands Television Network when he was 16. He also worked as a technician at the local theatre and part time radio DJ for Z99.

After leaving the Cayman Islands to study screenwriting at USC, Flowers made his debut with a short film, Swallow, which was a Sundance selection and later acquired by HBO. Flowers returned to the Cayman Islands to direct the independent thriller, Haven, starring Orlando Bloom, Zoe Saldaña, Anthony Mackie, and Bill Paxton. Over the years, he has directed music videos for Ziggy Marley, Damian "Jr Gong" Marley, Jessica Lowndes and Post Malone. Frank E also serves as chairperson of the Cayman Islands Film Commission Board.
