= Matthew Michael Carnahan =

American screenwriter

- Born: Port Huron, Michigan, U.S.
- Other name: Matt Carnahan
- Occupations: Screenwriter, film director
- Relatives: Joe Carnahan (brother)

Matthew Michael Carnahan (sometimes credited as Matt Carnahan) is an American scriptwriter. Among his numerous works are screenplays for The Kingdom (2007); the film adaptation of the hit BBC television drama serial State of Play; and Lions for Lambs for United Artists. He also worked on the zombie film World War Z (2013). He wrote the screenplay for the feature film Dark Waters (2019), based on a 2016 feature article about industrial pollution in The New York Times magazine.

== Filmography ==
Film

Year	Title	Director	Writer	Producer
2007	The Kingdom	No	Yes	No
2007	Lions for Lambs	No	Yes	Yes
2009	State of Play	No	Yes	No
2013	World War Z	No	Yes	No
2016	Deepwater Horizon	No	Yes	No
2019	21 Bridges	No	Yes	No
2019	Dark Waters	No	Yes	No
2019	Mosul	Yes	Yes	No
