= Battle Born World Tour =

2012–14 concert tour by the Killers

- Tour by The Killers
- Associated album: Battle Born
- Start date: July 19, 2012
- End date: August 21, 2014
- Legs: 13
- No. of shows: 74 in North America; 69 in Europe; 11 in Asia; 7 in Oceania; 6 in South America; 167 total

The Killers concert chronology
- Day & Age World Tour (2008–10); Battle Born World Tour (2012–14); Wonderful Wonderful World Tour (2017–18)

The Battle Born World Tour is the fourth major concert tour by American rock band The Killers, in support of their fourth studio album Battle Born, which was released in September 2012. The tour included the band's biggest show to date at Wembley Stadium. It also saw them visit new territories including Russia, Ukraine, China and more. The tour was the 43rd highest grossing worldwide during 2013.

== History ==
During the summer of 2012, the Killers played festivals across Europe and North America as well as intimate shows in small venues. The band then began a promo tour in September 2012, before the proper tour started on October 26, 2012 in Glasgow, Scotland. The band then went on to play shows in 41 different countries across Europe, North America, South America, Asia and Oceania. Ted Sablay who toured with the band during the Sam's Town Tour returned as an additional musician, alongside Jake Blanton who previously toured with frontman Brandon Flowers during his first solo tour.

The stage setup included a giant lightbulb keyboard stand similar to the one used during the Day & Age World Tour, but this time in the shape of the lightning bolt from the cover of the Battle Born album. The pyrotechnics for the tour were provided by Le Maitre Events.

Pyrotechnics during "Miss Atomic Bomb"

On November 13, 2012, the band's show at Manchester Arena was abruptly stopped during the song "Bling (Confession of a King)" with lead singer Brandon Flowers telling the crowd that his voice had 'gone' and he couldn't continue, resulting in the following night's show also in Manchester being cancelled. Two days later, both shows were rescheduled and eventually took place on February 17 and 18, 2013, respectively.

The band's shows on December 13, 14 & 15th in Camden, New York City & Toronto were cancelled after Brandon Flowers contracted laryngitis. The band was later forced to cancel a number of shows during the European leg of the tour in March 2013, due to winter storms. All of these shows were rescheduled for May & June 2013 with the exception of the band's scheduled appearance Caprices Festival in Switzerland which was cancelled indefinitely.

Bassist Mark Stoermer didn't perform with the band during the Asian leg of the tour, believed to be as a result of a back injury. He tweeted "Everything is alright, just need to spend this time at home. Looking forward to returning." Keuning was stressed during his absence, telling the NME that he was "sick of this". Jake Blanton played bass in his absence. He returned for the final show of the tour in Las Vegas.

== Wembley Stadium ==
On June 22, 2013, the band headlined Wembley Stadium. It was their biggest show to date with 69,745 people in attendance. At the show, the band performed a new song that was written specifically for the night titled 'The Wembley Song', the song namechecked various bands who had headlined both the old and new stadium, and also made references to the 1966 World Cup Final and the old stadiums famous Twin Towers. The final verse of the song explored the band's career to date ("From Dave's Apartment to Wembley").

Later that night, the band performed a surprise set at The Garage, accommodating only 600. Fans were let in on a first-come, first-served basis and the setlist consisted of a mix of hits and more obscure tracks rarely played live. The band had performed a similar show in El Paso the previous month. Both shows were professionally filmed by director Giorgio Testi. A video of the 'Wembley Song' was posted on the band's official YouTube channel and the band has hinted that more footage from the show may be released at some point.

Critical reviews were positive, Mark Beaumont in The Guardian gave a 5 star review calling it "A night the stadium league got a whole lot brighter, and lightning struck London twice". In a glowing write-up Gigwise stated "their 23-song strong set feels like every good Wembley gig should: historic". In another good review the Evening Standard remarked "The Killers seemed genuinely thrilled to be here, especially as their career first burst into life in London".

== Set list ==
July 20, 2012 in Asheville, North Carolina

1. "Runaways"
2. "Somebody Told Me"
3. "Smile Like You Mean It"
4. "Spaceman"
5. "This Is Your Life"
6. "The Rising Tide"
7. "Miss Atomic Bomb"
8. "For Reasons Unknown"
9. "Bling (Confession of a King)"
10. "Shadowplay" (Joy Division cover)
11. "Human"
12. "A Dustland Fairytale"
13. "Read My Mind"
14. "Mr. Brightside"
15. "All These Things That I've Done"

Encore:

1. "Flesh and Bone"
2. "Jenny Was a Friend of Mine"
3. "When You Were Young"

June 22nd, 2013 in London

1. "Enterlude"
2. "When You Were Young"
3. "Spaceman"
4. "The Way It Was"
5. "Smile Like You Mean It"
6. "This River is Wild"
7. "Bling (Confession of a King)"
8. "Shadowplay" (Joy Division cover)
9. "Miss Atomic Bomb"
10. "Human"
11. "Somebody Told Me"
12. "I Think We're Alone Now" (Tommy James & The Shondells cover)
13. "Here with Me"
14. "For Reasons Unknown"
15. "From Here on Out"
16. "A Dustland Fairytale"
17. "Wembley Song"
18. "Read My Mind"
19. "Runaways"
20. "All These Things That I've Done"

Encore:

1. "Flesh and Bone"
2. "Jenny Was a Friend of Mine"
3. "Battle Born"
4. "Mr. Brightside"

October 26, 2012 in Glasgow

1. "A Matter of Time"
2. "Flesh and Bone"
3. "Smile Like You Mean It"
4. "Spaceman"
5. "Bling (Confession of a King)"
6. "Miss Atomic Bomb"
7. "Human"
8. "Here with Me"
9. "For Reasons Unknown"
10. "The Way It Was"
11. "Deadlines and Commitments"
12. "Somebody Told Me"
13. "Jenny Was a Friend of Mine"
14. "A Dustland Fairytale"
15. "Read My Mind"
16. "Runaways"
17. "Mr. Brightside"
18. "All These Things That I've Done"

Encore:

1. "From Here on Out"
2. "Be Still"
3. "When You Were Young"
4. "Battle Born"

=== Covers ===
During the Battle Born World Tour, guitarist Dave Keuning and frontman Brandon Flowers would often play a short cover that had some sort of connection to the town or region in which the band were performing. These covers included songs by the Beatles, Oasis, the Smiths, U2, Van Morrison, Alphaville, Frank Sinatra, The Strokes, Travis, Prince, Crowded House, Otis Redding, Johnny Cash, Bruce Springsteen, Dean Martin, Bob Seger and more. On January 26, 2013, which is Australia Day in Australia, the band performed in Melbourne, and did a cover of the Australian folk song "Waltzing Matilda". During their headline performance at the Life Is Beautiful Festival on October 27, 2013, they performed a cover of Pale Blue Eyes in tribute to Lou Reed, who had died earlier that day.

== Personnel ==
=== The Killers ===
- Brandon Flowers – lead vocals, keyboards, piano, bass on "For Reasons Unknown"
- Dave Keuning – lead guitar, backing vocals
- Mark Stoermer – bass, backing vocals, rhythm guitar on "For Reasons Unknown"
- Ronnie Vannucci Jr. – drums, percussion

=== Additional musicians ===
- Ted Sablay – rhythm guitar, lead guitar, keyboards, backing vocals
- Jake Blanton – keyboards, rhythm guitar, lead guitar, backing vocals, bass (during the tour of Asia, except for "For Reasons Unknown" in which he plays keyboards)
- Rob Whited – percussion
- Bobby Lee Parker – acoustic guitar

== Tour dates ==
Date	City	Country	Venue	Opening act(s)
Warm Up Dates
July 19, 2012	Asheville	United States	The Orange Peel	—
July 20, 2012	Richmond	United States	National Theater	—
July 21, 2012 ^{[A]}	Dover	United States	Dover International Speedway	—
July 23, 2012	New York City	United States	Webster Hall	—
July 24, 2012	New York City	United States	Capitale	—
August 10, 2012	Kraków	Poland	Laznia Nowa Theatre	—
August 11, 2012 ^{[B]}	Kraków	Poland	Museum of Aviation	—
August 12, 2012 ^{[C]}	Obuda Island	Hungary	Obuda Island	—
August 15, 2012 ^{[D]}	St. Pölten	Austria	Frequency Festival	—
August 17, 2012	Leeds	England	O_{2} Academy Leeds	—
August 18, 2012 ^{[E]}	Staffordshire	England	Weston Park	—
August 19, 2012 ^{[E]}	Chelmsford	England	Hylands Park	—
August 23, 2012 ^{[F]}	Zürich	Switzerland	Rumlang Festival Grounds	—
August 31, 2012 ^{[G]}	Verona	Italy	Villafranca	—
September 2, 2012 ^{[H]}	County Laois	Ireland	Stradbally Hall	—
September 4, 2012	Oslo	Norway	Sentrum Scene	—
September 7, 2012 ^{[I]}	Berlin	Germany	Tempelhof Airport	—
September 8, 2012	Baden-Baden	Germany	Theater Baden-Baden	—
September 10, 2012	London	England	HMV Forum	—
September 11, 2012 ^{[J]}	London	England	Roundhouse	—
September 12, 2012	London	England	KOKO	—
September 15, 2012 ^{[K]}	Madrid	Spain	Madrid Arena	—
September 18, 2012	New York City	United States	Paradise Theatre	—
September 22, 2012	Toronto	Canada	Polson Pier	—
September 26, 2012	Los Angeles	United States	The Fonda Theatre	—
Leg I: Europe I
October 26, 2012	Glasgow	Scotland	Scottish Exhibition and Conference Centre	Tegan & Sara
October 27, 2012	Aberdeen	Scotland	GE Oil and Gas Arena	Tegan & Sara
October 31, 2012	Birmingham	England	LG Arena	Tegan & Sara
November 1, 2012	Birmingham	England	LG Arena	Tegan & Sara
November 3, 2012	Nottingham	England	Capital FM Arena	Tegan & Sara
November 4, 2012	Newcastle	England	Metro Radio Arena	Tegan & Sara
November 5, 2012	Cardiff	Wales	Motorpoint Arena Cardiff	Tegan & Sara
November 8, 2012	Sheffield	England	Motorpoint Arena Sheffield	Tegan & Sara
November 9, 2012	Liverpool	England	Echo Arena	Tegan & Sara
November 16, 2012	London	England	The O_{2} Arena	Tegan & Sara
November 17, 2012	London	England	The O_{2} Arena	Tegan & Sara
Leg II: North America				
November 29, 2012	Broomfield	United States	1stBank Center	Tegan & Sara
November 30, 2012	Orem	United States	UCCU Center	Tegan & Sara
December 3, 2012	Vancouver	Canada	Pacific Coliseum	Tegan & Sara
December 4, 2012^{[L]}	Seattle	United States	KeyArena	—
December 5, 2012 ^{[M]}	Portland	United States	Theatre of the Clouds	—
December 7, 2012^{[N]}	San Diego	United States	Viejas Arena	—
December 8, 2012^{[O]}	Oakland	United States	Oracle Arena	—
December 9, 2012^{[P]}	Los Angeles	United States	Gibson Amphitheatre	—
December 17, 2012	Boston	United States	Agganis Arena	Tegan & Sara
December 18, 2012	Fairfax	United States	Patriot Center	Tegan & Sara
December 20, 2012	Ypsilanti	United States	Ypsilanti Convocation Center	Tegan & Sara
December 21, 2012	Chicago	United States	UIC Pavilion	Tegan & Sara
December 28, 2012	Las Vegas	United States	Chelsea Ballroom	Louis XIV, Most Thieves
December 29, 2012	Las Vegas	United States	Chelsea Ballroom	Louis XIV, Most Thieves
January 7, 2013	Las Vegas	United States	Rain Nightclub at the Palms	—
Leg III: Australia
January 16, 2013	Sydney	Australia	The Metro Theatre	—
January 18, 2013^{[Q]}	Sydney	Australia	Sydney Showground	—
January 20, 2013^{[Q]}	Brisbane	Australia	Gold Coast Parklands	—
January 22, 2013	Melbourne	Australia	Palace Theatre	Steve Smyth
January 25, 2013^{[Q]}	Adelaide	Australia	Adelaide Showgrounds	—
January 26, 2013^{[Q]}	Melbourne	Australia	Flemington Racecourse	—
January 28, 2013^{[Q]}	Perth	Australia	Claremont Showground	—
Leg IV: Europe II
February 17, 2013	Manchester	England	Manchester Arena	Howling Bells
February 18, 2013	Manchester	England	Manchester Arena	Howling Bells
February 21, 2013	Belfast	Northern Ireland	Odyssey Arena	Howling Bells
February 22, 2013	Dublin	Ireland	The O_{2}	Howling Bells
February 26, 2013	Helsinki	Finland	Hartwall Areena	Louis XIV
February 28, 2013	Stockholm	Sweden	Ericsson Globe	Louis XIV
March 1, 2013	Bærum	Norway	Telenor Arena	Louis XIV
March 2, 2013	Malmö	Sweden	Malmö Arena	Louis XIV
March 4, 2013	Hamburg	Germany	O_{2} World Hamburg	Louis XIV
March 5, 2013	Munich	Germany	Munich Zenith	Louis XIV
March 7, 2013	Cologne	Germany	Lanxess Arena	Louis XIV
March 11, 2013	Amsterdam	Netherlands	Ziggo Dome	Louis XIV
Leg V: Latin America
March 26, 2013	Asunción	Paraguay	Jockey Club del Paraguay	—
March 29, 2013^{[R]}	São Paulo	Brazil	Jockey Club de São Paulo	—
March 31, 2013	Buenos Aires	Argentina	Estadio G.E.B.A.	—
April 2, 2013	Santiago	Chile	Movistar Arena	We Are The Grand
April 4, 2013	Lima	Peru	Estadio Nacional	—
April 7, 2013^{[S]}	Bogotá	Colombia	Parque Deportivo 222	—
April 9, 2013	Monterrey	Mexico	Monterrey Arena	Louis XIV
April 10, 2013	Monterrey	Mexico	Monterrey Arena	Louis XIV
April 12, 2013	Guadalajara	Mexico	Estadio Tres de Marzo	Louis XIV
April 13, 2013	Mexico City	Mexico	Foro Sol	Louis XIV
Leg VI: North America II
April 27, 2013	San Francisco	United States	Bill Graham Civic Auditorium	The Felice Brothers
April 28, 2013	San Francisco	United States	Bill Graham Civic Auditorium	The Felice Brothers
May 1, 2013	Anaheim	United States	Honda Center	The Felice Brothers
May 2, 2013	Los Angeles	United States	Los Angeles Memorial Sports Arena	The Felice Brothers
May 4, 2013	Tucson	United States	Kino Veterans Memorial Stadium	—
May 5, 2013	Albuquerque	United States	Isleta Amphitheater	—
May 6, 2013	El Paso	United States	Chavez Theatre	The Virgins
May 6, 2013	El Paso	United States	The Lowbrow Palace	The Virgins
May 8, 2013	Houston	United States	Bayou Music Center	The Virgins
May 9, 2013	Grand Prairie	United States	Verizon Theatre at Grand Prairie	The Virgins
May 10, 2013	Cedar Park	United States	Cedar Park Center	The Virgins
May 12, 2013	Nashville	United States	Grand Ole Opry House	The Virgins
May 14, 2013	New York City	United States	Madison Square Garden	The Virgins
May 15, 2013	Toronto	Canada	Air Canada Centre	The Virgins
May 16, 2013	Cincinnati	United States	Horseshoe Casino Cincinnati	The Virgins
May 18, 2013	Brooklyn	United States	Barclays Center	The Virgins
May 19, 2013	Camden	United States	Susquehanna Bank Center	The Virgins
Leg VI: Europe III
June 6, 2013	Esch-sur-Alzette	Luxembourg	Rockhal	Most Thieves
June 7, 2013^{[T]}	Nürnberg	Germany	Volkspark Dutzendteich	—
June 8, 2013^{[U]}	Nürburg	Germany	Nürburgring	—
June 10, 2013	Paris	France	Zénith de Paris	—
June 11, 2013^{[V]}	Rome	Italy	Capannelle Racecourse	—
June 12, 2013^{[W]}	Milan	Italy	Ippodromo del Galoppo	—
June 14, 2013^{[X]}	Landgraaf	Netherlands	Megaland	—
June 15, 2013^{[Y]}	Isle of Wight	England	Seaclose Park	—
June 17, 2013	Forest	Belgium	Forest National	Most Thieves
June 22, 2013	London	England	Wembley Stadium	The Gaslight Anthem, James
June 23, 2013	London	England	The Garage	—
June 26, 2013	Riga	Latvia	Mežaparka Lielā estrāde	—
June 29, 2013^{[Z]}	Moscow	Russia	All-Russia Exhibition Centre	—
July 2, 2013	Kyiv	Ukraine	Palace of Sports	—
July 13, 2013	Dublin	Ireland	Phoenix Park	Frank Ocean, Two Door Cinema Club
July 14, 2013^{[AA]}	Kinross	Scotland	Balado Airfield	—
July 17, 2013^{[BB]}	Lucca	Italy	Piazza Napoleone	—
July 19, 2013^{[CC]}	Lisbon	Portugal	Super Bock Super Rock	—
July 21, 2013^{[DD]}	Castellón	Spain	Benicàssim	—
Leg VII: North America III
August 1, 2013	Saint Paul	United States	Roy Wilkins Auditorium	The Virgins
August 2, 2013^{[EE]}	Chicago	United States	Grant Park	—
August 3, 2013	Bonner Springs	United States	Sandstone Amphitheater	The Virgins
August 5, 2013	Cleveland	United States	Jacobs Pavilion at Nautica	The Virgins
August 6, 2013	Columbus	United States	Lifestyle Communities Pavilion	The Virgins
August 8, 2013	Newark	United States	Prudential Center	The Virgins
August 9, 2013	Atlantic City	United States	Borgata Events Center	The Virgins
August 10, 2013	Columbia	United States	Merriweather Post Pavilion	The Virgins
August 12, 2013	Raleigh	United States	Red Hat Amphitheater	The Virgins
August 13, 2013	Charleston	United States	Family Circle Tennis Center	The Virgins
August 15, 2013	Alpharetta	United States	Verizon Wireless Amphitheatre	The Virgins
August 16, 2013	Orlando	United States	Hard Rock Live	The Virgins
August 17, 2013	Miami	United States	American Airlines Arena	The Virgins
September 6, 2013	Windsor	Canada	Colosseum at Caesars Windsor	—
September 7, 2013 ^{[FF]}	Pittsburgh	United States	Stage AE	—
September 8, 2013 ^{[GG]}	St. Louis	United States	Forest Park	—
Leg VIII: Asia ^{[Note]}
September 21, 2013^{[HH]}	Singapore	Singapore	Marina Bay Street Circuit	—
September 22, 2013	Selangor	Malaysia	Sepang International Circuit	Kyoto Protocol
September 24, 2013	Chek Lap Kok	Hong Kong	AsiaWorld–Arena	—
September 26, 2013	Quezon City	Philippines	Smart Araneta Coliseum	Sandwich
September 28, 2013	Taipei	Taiwan	TWTC Nangang	—
October 1, 2013	Beijing	China	MasterCard Center	—
October 3, 2013	Shanghai	China	Mercedes-Benz Arena	—
October 5, 2013	Seoul	South Korea	Olympic Park	—
October 8, 2013	Tokyo	Japan	Studio Coast	—
October 9, 2013	Tokyo	Japan	Differ Ariake	—
October 11, 2013^{[II]}	Dubai	United Arab Emirates	Atlantis the Palm	—
Leg X: North America IV
October 27, 2013 ^{[JJ]}	Las Vegas	United States	Downtown	—
Leg XI: Europe IV
November 6, 2013	London	England	Eventim Appollo	—
November 7, 2013	London	England	Maida Vale Studios	—
November 8, 2013	Amsterdam	Netherlands	Paradiso	—
Leg XII: North America V
April 3, 2014	Dallas	United States	House of Blues	—
April 5, 2014 ^{[M]}	Dallas	United States	Reunion Park	—
May 14, 2014	Uncasville	United States	Mohegan Sun Arena	—
May 15, 2014	Bethlehem	United States	Sands Bethlehem Event Center	—
May 17, 2014 ^{[NN]}	Gulf Shores	United States	The Hangout	—
July 6, 2014	Quebec City	Canada	Le Cabaret du Capitole	—
July 8, 2014 ^{[OO]}	Quebec City	Canada	Plains of Abraham	—
July 9, 2014 ^{[PP]}	Ottawa	Canada	Le Breton Festival Park	—
July 10, 2014	Montreal	Canada	Bell Centre	—
July 12, 2014 ^{[QQ]}	Charlottetown	Canada	Event Grounds	—
August 9, 2014	San Francisco	United States	The Independent	—
August 10, 2014 ^{[RR]}	San Francisco	United States	Golden Gate Park	—
Leg XIII: Europe V
August 15, 2014	Liverpool	England	O_{2} Academy Liverpool	—
August 16, 2014 ^{[SS]}	Staffordshire	England	Weston Park	—
August 17, 2014 ^{[SS]}	Chelmsford	England	Hylands Park	—
August 19, 2014 ^{[TT]}	Glasgow	Scotland	Bellahouston Park	—
August 21, 2014	Belfast	Northern Ireland	Boucher Playing Fields	—

=== Cancellations and rescheduled shows ===
Date	City	Country	Reason
November 13, 2012	Manchester	Manchester Arena	Rescheduled to February 17, 2013 due to illness.
November 14, 2012	Manchester	Manchester Arena	Rescheduled to February 18, 2013 due to illness.
December 13, 2012	Camden	Susquehanna Bank Center	Rescheduled to May 19, 2013 due to illness.
December 14, 2012	New York City	Madison Square Garden	Rescheduled to May 14, 2013 due to illness.
December 15, 2012	Toronto	Air Canada Centre	Rescheduled to May 15, 2013 due to illness.
March 8, 2013	Brussels	Forest National	Rescheduled to June 17, 2013 due to illness.
March 9, 2013	Esch-sur-Alzette	Rockhal	Rescheduled to June 6, 2013 due to illness.
March 12, 2013	Paris	Zénith de Paris	Rescheduled to June 10, 2013 due to dangerous weather conditions.
March 13, 2013^{[KK]}	Valais	Crans-Montana	Cancelled due to dangerous weather conditions.
October 7, 2013	Tokyo	Studio Coast	Rescheduled to October 9, 2013 due to illness, and changed the venue to Differ Ariake.
October 26, 2013 ^{[LL]}	Mountain View	Shoreline Amphitheatre	Band's scheduled appearance cancelled.

Festivals and other miscellaneous performances

^{A} This concert was a part of "Firefly Music Festival"
^{B} This concert was a part of "Coke Live Music Festival"
^{C} This concert was a part of "Sziget Festival"
^{D} This concert was a part of "Frequency Festival"
^{E} This concert was a part of "V Festival"
^{F} This concert was a part of "Zurich Openair"
^{G} This concert was a part of "A Perfect Day Festival"
^{H} This concert was a part of "Electric Picnic Festival"
^{I} This concert was a part of "Berlin Festival"
^{J} This concert was a part of "iTunes Festival"
^{K} This concert was a part of "DCode Festival"
^{L} This concert was a part of "Deck the Hall Ball"
^{M} This concert was a part of "December to Remember"
^{N} This concert was a part of "Wrex the Halls"
^{O} This concert was a part of "Not So Silent Night"
^{P} This concert was a part of "Almost Acoustic Christmas"
^{Q} This concert was a part of "Big Day Out"
^{R} This concert was a part of "Lollapalooza Brazil"
^{S} This concert was a part of "Festival Estéreo Picnic"
^{T} This concert was a part of "Rock im Park"
^{U} This concert was a part of "Rock am Ring"
^{V} This concert was a part of "Rock in Roma"
^{W} This concert was a part of "City Sound Festival"
^{X} This concert was a part of "Pinkpop Festival"
^{Y} This concert was a part of "Isle of Wight Festival 2013"
^{Z} This concert was a part of "Park Live Festival"
^{AA} This concert was a part of "T in the Park"
^{BB} This concert was a part of "Lucca Summer Festival"
^{CC} This concert was a part of "Super Bock Super Rock Festival"
^{DD} This concert was a part of "Festival Internacional de Benicàssim"
^{EE} This concert was a part of "Lollapalooza"
^{FF} This concert was a part of "Raise Up Your Summer Festival"
^{GG} This concert was a part of "LouFest"
^{HH} This concert was a part of "2013 Singapore Grand Prix"
^{II} This concert was a part of "Sandance Festival"
^{JJ} This concert was a part of "Life Is Beautiful Festival"
^{KK} This concert was a part of "Caprices Festival"
^{LL} This concert was a part of "Bridge School Benefit"
^{MM} This concert was a part of "March Madness Music Festival"
^{NN} This concert was a part of "Hangout Music Fest"
^{OO} This concert was a part of "Festival d'été de Québec"
^{PP} This concert was a part of "RBC Royal Bank Bluesfest"
^{QQ} This concert was a part of "Big Red Music Festival"
^{RR} This concert was a part of "Outside Lands Music & Arts Festival"
^{SS} This concert was a part of "V Festival"
^{TT} This concert was a part of "Glasgow Summer Sessions"
^{Note} Bassist Mark Stoermer was absent from this leg of the tour. Jake Blanton played Bass.

== Box office score data ==
Venue	City	Tickets sold / available	Gross revenue
Wembley Stadium	London	69,745 / 71,000 (98%)	$5,238,171
Foro Sol	Mexico City	56,375 / 56,411 (99%)	$3,405,042
The O2 Arena	London	34,445 / 35,474 (97%)	$2,422,570
Manchester Arena	Manchester	31,165 / 32,381 (96%)	$1,993,210
Estadio Tres De Marzo	Guadalajara	26,325 / 27,172 (96%)	$1,886,715
Bill Graham Civic Auditorium	San Francisco	15,729 / 15,729 (100%)	$936,508
Barclays Center	Brooklyn	14,008 / 14,008 (100%)	$707,501
Madison Square Garden	New York City	13,692 / 13,692 (100%)	$641,264
Los Angeles Sports Arena	Los Angeles	12,998 / 12,998 (100%)	$705,786
Air Canada Centre	Toronto	11,522 / 11,522 (100%)	$627,733
O2 World Arena	Hamburg	8,784 / 11,213 (78%)	$438,958
UIC Pavilion	Chicago	8,689 / 8,689 (100%)	$434,247
Family Circle Tennis Center	Charleston	7,062 / 7,360 (96%)	$286,053
Mohegan Sun Arena	Uncasville	6,450 / 7,262 (89%)	$371,753
Verizon Theater	Grand Prairie	6,258 / 6,258 (100%)	$314,160
The Colosseum at Caesars Palace	Windsor	4,934 / 4,934 (100%)	$339,764
Horseshoe Casino	Cincinnati	3,887 / 4,056 (95%)	$218,146

== TV ==
Notable television performances

September 7, 2012	Norway & Sweden	Skavlan	Performed "Runaways"
September 15, 2012	United Kingdom	The Jonathan Ross Show	Performed "Runaways"
September 20, 2012	United States	The Late Show with David Letterman	Performed "When You Were Young" & "Runaways"
September 24, 2012	United States	Jimmy Kimmel Live	Performed "Miss Atomic Bomb" & "Runaways"
September 28, 2012	United States	The Ellen DeGeneres Show	Performed "Runaways" & "All These Things That I've Done"
October 30, 2012	United Kingdom	Later... with Jools Holland	Performed "From Here On Out"
December 18, 2012	United States	The Voice	Performed "Here With Me"
November 8, 2013	United Kingdom	Later... with Jools Holland	Performed "Shot At The Night"
November 10, 2013	Netherlands	MTV Europe Music Awards	Performed "Shot At The Night" & "Mr. Brightside"
November 12, 2013	United States	Jimmy Kimmel Live	Performed a set including "Shot At The Night" & "Runaways"
November 13, 2013	United States	Jimmy Kimmel Live	Performed a set
November 15, 2013	United States	The Ellen DeGeneres Show	Performed "Shot At The Night" & "Mr. Brightside"
December 14, 2013	United States	The X Factor UK	Performed "Human" & "Mr. Brightside"
