= List of the Killers band members =

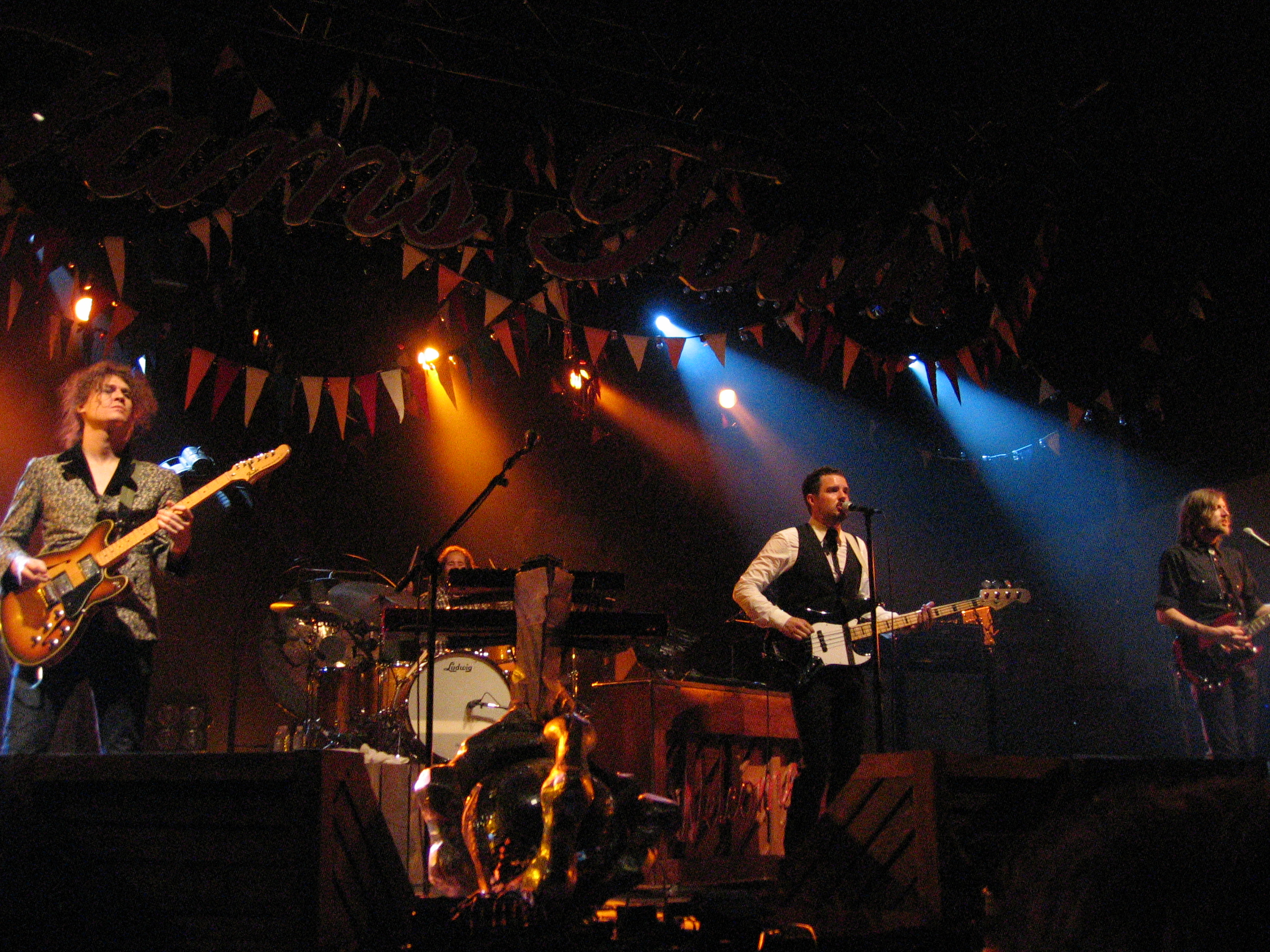
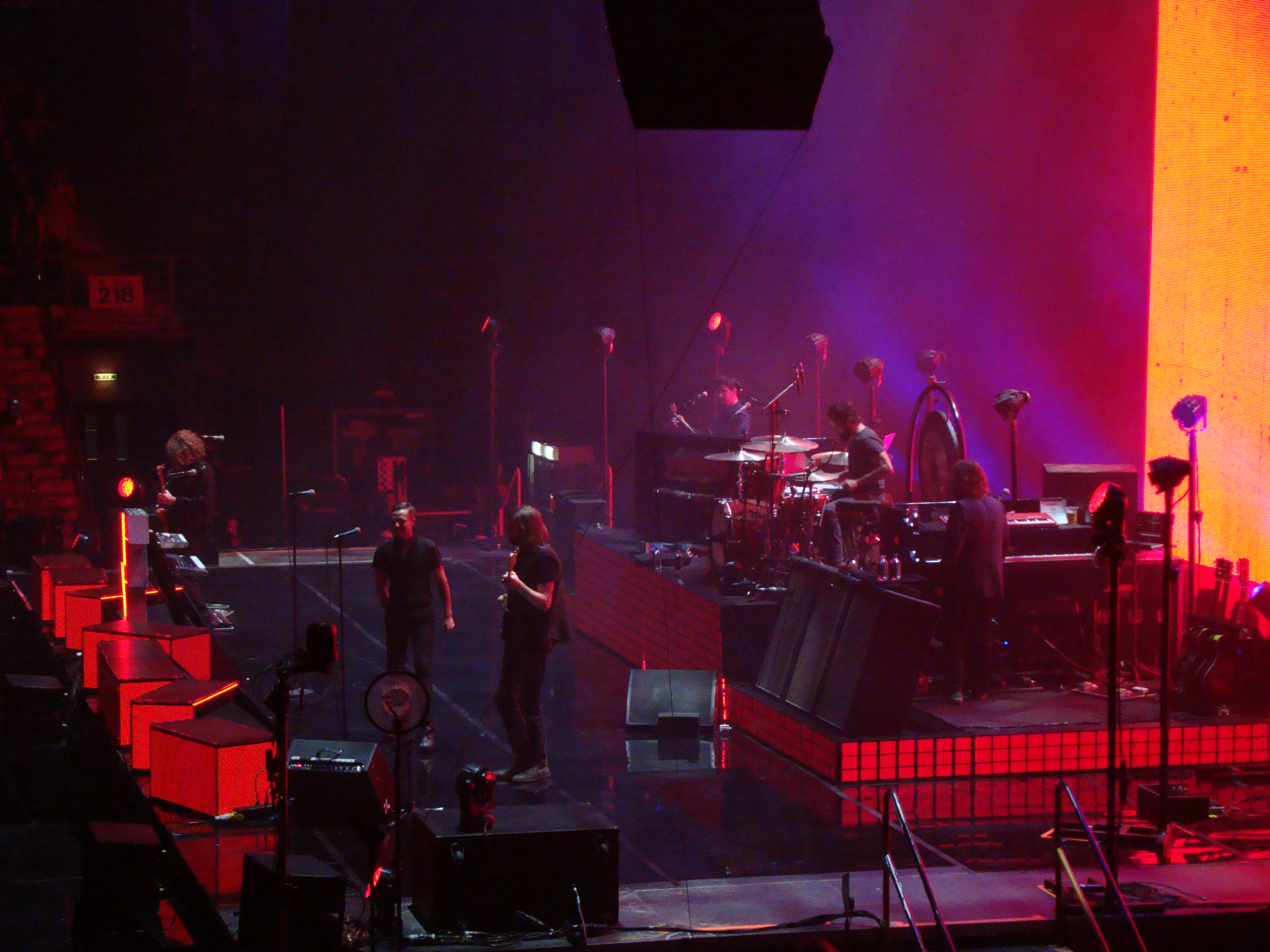
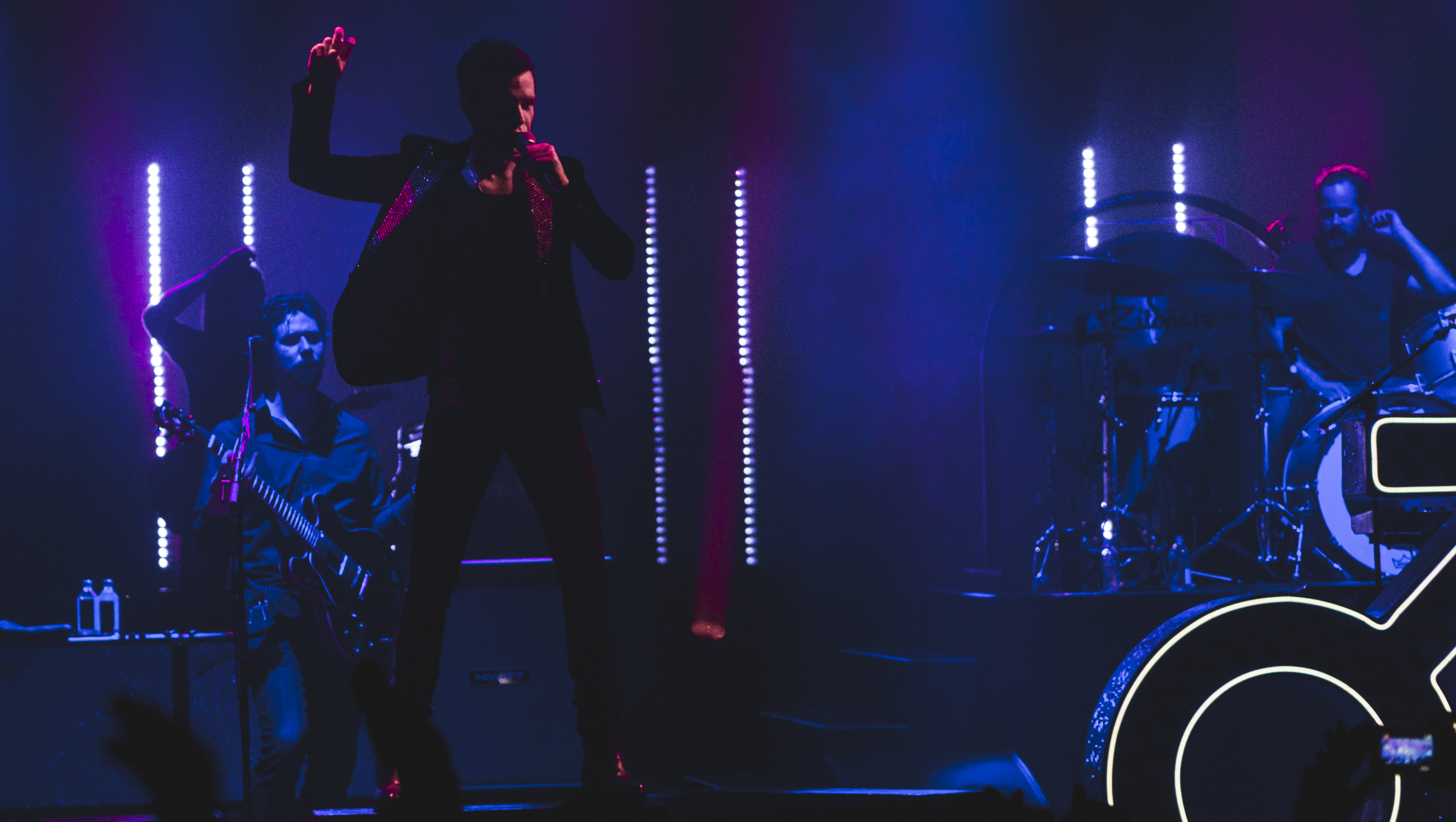
The Killers performing in 2006, 2012, and 2017

The Killers are an American rock band, formed in Las Vegas in 2001 by Brandon Flowers (lead vocals, keyboards, bass) and Dave Keuning (guitar, backing vocals). The band currently consists of Flowers and Keuning alongside drummer Ronnie Vannucci Jr. and bassist Mark Stoermer (both since 2002).

== History ==
Flowers and Keuning first connected when Flowers responded to an ad that Keuning left in a local newspaper. After writing songs in Keuning's apartment, the band recorded demos with drummer Matt Norcross in November 2001. The band were joined by Dell Neal on bass for further demos the next month. The new four piece played shows around Las Vegas throughout 2002. Norcross was fired in Summer 2002, and was briefly replaced by Brian Havens before he was also fired. Dell Neal also left soon after for personal reasons.

Ronnie Vannucci Jr. joined as the band's new drummer after Havens departure, playing his first show on August 30, 2002. For that show, the band were joined by Mark Stoermer on bass, initially as a stand in while the band tried out other bassists, although Stoermer became permanent bassist soon after, having previously been invited to be second guitarist.

In 2006, for the Sam's Town Tour, the band were joined by touring musicians Ted Sablay on keyboards, guitar, and drum tech, as well as Rob Whited on percussion. In 2008, for the Day & Age World Tour, Sablay was replaced by Ray Suen. The band was also joined by Tommy Marth on saxophone, and guitar tech Bobby Lee Parker on acoustic guitar. Suen and Marth both departed after the tour in 2010. Sablay returned for the Battle Born World Tour, alongside Jake Blanton also on keyboards and guitar. During the Asia leg of the tour, Stoermer had to depart due to an illness, with Blanton playing bass in his absence. After the tour, Parker and Whited both stopped performing.

For a North American tour in 2016, the band was joined by Brian Karscig on guitar/keyboards, while Blanton played bass instead of Stoermer. Blanton continued to play bass for the Wonderful Wonderful World Tour in 2017, where the band was joined by Robbie Connolly and Taylor Milne on keyboards/guitar, while Sablay replaced Keuning, who had retired from touring. The band was also joined by backing vocalists Erica Canales, Amanda Brown, and Danielle Withers.

For the Imploding the Mirage Tour in 2022, Keuning returned and Sablay moved to back rhythm guitar/keyboards. Withers and Brown were also replaced by Melissa Mcmillan and Tori Allen. Keuning left the tour in May and Sablay moved back to lead guitar. Keuning returned in July. Allen and McMillan were replaced by Nicky Egan and Miranda Joan in 2023. Sablay also played lead guitar with Keuning being absent for the rest of the tour, although he has since returned in 2024.

== Official members ==
=== Current members ===
Image	Name	Years active	Instruments	Release contributions
	Brandon Flowers	2001–present	lead vocals; keyboards; synthesizer; bass (Note: Flowers still plays bass during live performances of "For Reasons Unknown".); guitar (2020–present; in studio)	all releases
	Dave Keuning (Note: Keuning returned to touring with the band between 2020 and 2022, but is currently on touring hiatus.)	2001–2017; 2020–present	guitar; backing vocals	all releases, except Imploding the Mirage (2020)
	Ronnie Vannucci Jr.	2002–present	drums; percussion; guitar (2020–present) (Note: Vannucci Jr.'s guitar contributions to the band are mostly studio-based, save for recent live performances of "For Reasons Unknown".)	all releases
	Mark Stoermer (Note: Stoermer has been on a touring hiatus from the band since 2016, save for some select appearances.)	2002–present (hiatus 2020–2022)	bass; backing vocals; guitar (Note: Stoermer's guitar contributions to the band are almost entirely studio-based, save for live performances of "For Reasons Unknown".)	all releases, except Pressure Machine (2021)

=== Former members ===
Image	Name	Years active	Instruments	Release contributions
	Dell Neal	2001–2002	bass	early demos and live shows
	Matt Norcross	2001–2002	drums	early demos and live shows
	Brian Havens	2002	drums	live shows

== Touring musicians ==
=== Current touring musicians ===
Image	Name	Years active	Instruments	Release contributions
	Ted Sablay	2006–2007; 2011–present	lead guitar (2017–2020, 2022, 2023, 2025–present); rhythm guitar and keyboards (2006–2007, 2011–2017, 2022, 2022–2023, 2024–2025); backing vocals	Sawdust (2007); Day & Age (2008); (Red) Christmas EP (2011)
	Jake Blanton	2011–present	bass (2013, 2016–present); keyboards and rhythm guitar (2011–2016, 2024-2025); backing vocals	none
	Robbie Connolly	2017–present	keyboards; rhythm guitar; backing vocals	none
	Taylor Milne	2017–2020; 2022; 2023; 2025–present	keyboards; rhythm guitar; backing vocals	none
	Erica Canales	2018–present	backing vocals	none
	Nicky Egan	2023–present	backing vocals; acoustic guitar	none
	Miranda Joan	2023–present	backing vocals	none

=== Former touring musicians ===
Image	Name	Years active	Instruments	Release contributions
	Rob Whited	2006–2014	percussion; backing vocals	Live from the Royal Albert Hall (2009)
	Bobby Lee Parker	2008–2014	acoustic guitar	Live from the Royal Albert Hall (2009)
	Ray Suen	2008–2010	keyboards; violin; rhythm guitar; backing vocals	Live from the Royal Albert Hall (2009)
	Tommy Marth	2008–2010 (died 2012)	saxophone; backing vocals	Live from the Royal Albert Hall (2009)
	Brian Karscig	2016	rhythm guitar; keyboards; backing vocals	none
	Amanda Brown	2017–2018	backing vocals	none
	Danielle Withers	2017–2018	backing vocals	none
	Melissa McMillan	2021–2023	backing vocals	none
	Tori Allen	2021–2023	backing vocals; violin; acoustic guitar	none

== Line-ups ==
Period	Members	Releases
Mid 2001	Brandon Flowers – lead vocals, keyboards, bass; Dave Keuning – guitar, backing vocals	none – demos only
November – December 2001	Brandon Flowers – lead vocals, keyboards, bass; Dave Keuning – guitar, backing vocals; Matt Norcross – drums	none – demos only
December 2001 – summer 2002	Brandon Flowers – lead vocals, keyboards; Dave Keuning – guitar, backing vocals; Matt Norcross – drums; Dell Neal – bass	none – demos and live shows only
summer 2002	Brandon Flowers – lead vocals, keyboards; Dave Keuning – guitar, backing vocals; Dell Neal – bass; Brian Havens – drums	none – demos and live shows only
August 2002 – August 2017	Brandon Flowers – lead vocals, keyboards, bass; Dave Keuning – guitar, backing vocals; Ronnie Vannucci Jr. – drums; Mark Stoermer – bass, backing vocals, guitar	Hot Fuss (2004); Sam's Town (2006); Day & Age (2008); Live from the Royal Albert Hall (2009); (Red) Christmas EP (2011); Battle Born (2012); Don't Waste Your Wishes (2016); Wonderful Wonderful (2017)
August 2017 – January 2021	Brandon Flowers – lead vocals, keyboards, bass; Ronnie Vannucci Jr. – drums, guitar; Mark Stoermer – guitar, bass, backing vocals	Imploding the Mirage (2020)
January – August 2021	Brandon Flowers – lead vocals, keyboards; Ronnie Vannucci Jr. – drums, guitar; Dave Keuning – guitar, backing vocals	Pressure Machine (2021)
August 2021 – present	Brandon Flowers – lead vocals, keyboards, bass; Ronnie Vannucci Jr. – drums; Dave Keuning – guitar, backing vocals; Mark Stoermer – bass, backing vocals, guitar	none to date
