= Live from the Royal Albert Hall =

2009 live album by the Killers

Video by the Killers
- Released: November 9, 2009
- Recorded: July 5–6, 2009
- Venue: Royal Albert Hall (London)
- Length: 2:40:00
- Label: Island
- Director: Dick Carruthers

Live from the Royal Albert Hall is a live video and audio release by American rock band the Killers, released on November 9, 2009, by Island Records. The video is pulled from two nights the band performed at the Royal Albert Hall in July 2009, and also includes footage from festival dates the band headlined during the middle months of 2009. A CD of live material accompanies the DVD as part of the package. The artwork resembles the artwork for the band's third studio album, Day & Age, and was designed by artist Paul Normansell.

Live from the Royal Albert Hall

Live album by the Killers
- Released: November 9, 2009
- Recorded: July 5–6, 2009
- Venue: Royal Albert Hall (London)
- Genre: Indie rock
- Length: 78:18
- Label: Island

The Killers chronology
| Day & Age (2008) | Live from the Royal Albert Hall (2009) | (Red) Christmas EP (2011) |

Brandon Flowers said the decision to film the band's first live DVD at the Royal Albert Hall was because "London’s always been very good to us. They opened their arms to us before anybody else did. And Royal Albert Hall is a very iconic and special place. I grew up watching Morrissey videos that he had filmed there. So it was really exciting to be a part of it."

Live from the Royal Albert Hall was nominated for Best DVD at the 2010 NME Awards.

== Reception ==
=== Critical ===
Professional ratings
Review scores
| Source | Rating |
|---|---|
| AllMusic | 3.5/5 stars |
| The A.V. Club | Favourable |
| Contactmusic.com | Favorable |
| IGN | 4.5/5 stars |
| Rolling Stone | 4/5 stars |
| Starpulse | 5/5 stars |

Critical response to Live from the Royal Albert Hall was positive. Eric Stromsvold of Starpulse said the release was "quite possibly the best live album and video since Elvis and his 'Aloha From Hawaii' some 36 years ago. It's nothing less than rock and roll at its greatest." Barry Walters of Rolling Stone wrote that "Brandon Flowers doesn't sing: he testifies." Entertainment Weekly included the DVD on its "Must List", remarking, "When Brandon Flowers et al. explode into closing number 'When You Were Young,' and the fans start to sing (and then jump) along, it's a wonder those 138-year-old walls stay standing."

=== Commercial ===
Live from the Royal Albert Hall was the fourth best-selling music DVD of 2009 in the United Kingdom, selling 83,965 copies in the seven weeks following its release.

== Track listing ==
Disc one (DVD) / standalone Blu-ray disc
| No. | Title | Writer(s) | Length |
|---|---|---|---|
| 1. | "Enterlude" | Brandon Flowers |
| 2. | "Human" | Flowers; Dave Keuning; Mark Stoermer; Ronnie Vannucci |
| 3. | "This Is Your Life" | Flowers; Keuning; Stoermer; Vannucci |
| 4. | "Somebody Told Me" | Flowers; Keuning; Stoermer; Vannucci |
| 5. | "For Reasons Unknown" (extended) | Flowers |
| 6. | "The World We Live In" | Flowers; Keuning; Stoermer; Vannucci |
| 7. | "Joy Ride" | Flowers; Keuning; Stoermer; Vannucci |
| 8. | "I Can't Stay" (plus piano reprise) | Flowers; Keuning; Stoermer; Vannucci |
| 9. | "Bling (Confession of a King)" (extended) | Flowers; Stoermer |
| 10. | "Shadowplay" (Joy Division cover) | Ian Curtis; Peter Hook; Stephen Morris; Bernard Sumner |
| 11. | "Smile Like You Mean It" | Flowers; Stoermer |
| 12. | "Losing Touch" | Flowers; Keuning; Stoermer; Vannucci |
| 13. | "Spaceman" (extended) | Flowers; Keuning; Stoermer; Vannucci |
| 14. | "A Dustland Fairytale" (plus reprise) | Flowers; Keuning; Stoermer; Vannucci |
| 15. | "Sam's Town" (acoustic) | Flowers |
| 16. | "Read My Mind" | Flowers; Keuning; Stoermer |
| 17. | "Mr. Brightside" | Flowers; Keuning |
| 18. | "All These Things That I've Done" | Flowers |
| 19. | "Sweet Talk" | Flowers; Keuning; Stoermer; Vannucci |
| 20. | "This River Is Wild" | Flowers; Stoermer |
| 21. | "Bones" | Flowers; Stoermer; Vannucci |
| 22. | "Jenny Was a Friend of Mine" | Flowers; Stoermer |
| 23. | "When You Were Young" | Flowers; Keuning; Stoermer; Vannucci |
| 24. | "Exitlude" | Flowers |
| 25. | "Tranquilize" (live from Oxegen Festival 2009) (bonus footage) | Flowers; Keuning; Stoermer; Vannucci |
| 26. | "Human" (live from Hyde Park, London) (bonus footage) | Flowers; Keuning; Stoermer; Vannucci |
| 27. | "Mr. Brightside" (live from Hyde Park, London) (bonus footage) | Flowers; Keuning |
| 28. | "Smile Like You Mean It" (live from V Festival 2009) (bonus footage) | Flowers; Stoermer |
| 29. | "When You Were Young" (live from V Festival 2009) (bonus footage) | Flowers; Keuning; Stoermer; Vannucci |

- The DVD also includes behind-the-scenes footage, including interviews with crew and fans.
- Although it was not announced by the band, they also released a Blu-ray version of the concert, although this does not include the live CD.

Disc two (live CD)
| No. | Title | Writer(s) | Length |
|---|---|---|---|
| 1. | "Human" | Flowers; Keuning; Stoermer; Vannucci | 5:29 |
| 2. | "This Is Your Life" | Flowers; Keuning; Stoermer; Vannucci | 3:38 |
| 3. | "Somebody Told Me" | Flowers; Keuning; Stoermer; Vannucci | 3:21 |
| 4. | "The World We Live In" | Flowers; Keuning; Stoermer; Vannucci | 4:24 |
| 5. | "I Can't Stay" (plus piano reprise) | Flowers; Keuning; Stoermer; Vannucci | 4:51 |
| 6. | "Bling (Confession of a King)" (extended) | Flowers; Stoermer | 6:28 |
| 7. | "Shadowplay" (Joy Division cover) | Curtis; Hook; Morris; Sumner | 4:04 |
| 8. | "Smile Like You Mean It" | Flowers; Stoermer | 4:18 |
| 9. | "Losing Touch" | Flowers; Keuning; Stoermer; Vannucci | 4:10 |
| 10. | "Spaceman" (extended) | Flowers; Keuning; Stoermer; Vannucci | 5:24 |
| 11. | "A Dustland Fairytale" (plus reprise) | Flowers; Keuning; Stoermer; Vannucci | 4:57 |
| 12. | "Sam's Town" (acoustic) | Flowers | 4:03 |
| 13. | "Read My Mind" | Flowers; Keuning; Stoermer | 4:22 |
| 14. | "Mr. Brightside" | Flowers; Keuning | 3:53 |
| 15. | "All These Things That I've Done" | Flowers | 5:55 |
| 16. | "Jenny Was a Friend of Mine" | Flowers; Stoermer | 4:27 |
| 17. | "When You Were Young" | Flowers; Keuning; Stoermer; Vannucci | 4:43 |
| Total length: | | | 78:18 |

=== Limited edition formats ===
The Killers announced that they would be offering exclusive limited-edition packages for the album.

Collector's Package

- The album in DVD/CD or Blu-ray
- Poster promoting the original concerts
- Poster of the band and cover art
- 12" picture discs of "Human" and "Spaceman"
- 7" white vinyl of "Human"
- LP version of Day & Age
- iPod friendly "When You Were Young" video

Fan Package

- The album in DVD/CD or Blu-ray
- Poster promoting the original concerts
- iPod friendly "When You Were Young" video

== Personnel ==
=== The Killers ===
- Brandon Flowers: lead vocals, keyboards except on "For Reasons Unknown", bass on "For Reasons Unknown"
- Dave Keuning: lead guitar and backing vocals
- Mark Stoermer: bass except on "For Reasons Unknown", rhythm guitar on "For Reasons Unknown", backing vocals
- Ronnie Vannucci Jr.: drums, percussion

=== Support members ===
- Ray Suen: keyboards, rhythm guitar, violin and backing vocals
- Rob Whited: percussion and backing vocals
- Bobby Lee Parker: acoustic guitar
- Tommy Marth: saxophone and backing vocals

== Charts ==
=== Weekly charts ===
Weekly chart performance for Live from the Royal Albert Hall (album)
| Chart (2009) | Peak position |
|---|---|
| Dutch Albums (Album Top 100) | 35 |
| German Albums (Offizielle Top 100) | 60 |
| Mexican Albums (Top 100 Mexico) | 5 |
| Spanish Albums (Promusicae) | 42 |

Weekly chart performance for Live from the Royal Albert Hall (video)
| Chart (2009) | Peak position |
|---|---|
| Australian Music DVD (ARIA) | 5 |
| Austrian Music DVD (Ö3 Austria) | 4 |
| Belgian Music DVD (Ultratop Flanders) | 3 |
| Belgian Music DVD (Ultratop Wallonia) | 4 |
| Irish Music DVD (IRMA) | 1 |
| Portuguese Music DVD (AFP) | 4 |
| Swiss Music DVD (Schweizer Hitparade) | 2 |
| UK Music Videos (OCC) | 2 |
| US Music Video Sales (Billboard) | 1 |

=== Year-end charts ===
2009 year-end chart performance for Live from the Royal Albert Hall (video)
| Chart (2009) | Position |
|---|---|
| Australian Music DVD (ARIA) | 49 |
| UK Music Videos (OCC) | 4 |

2010 year-end chart performance for Live from the Royal Albert Hall (video)
| Chart (2010) | Position |
|---|---|
| US Music Video Sales (Billboard) | 9 |

== Certifications ==
Certifications for Live from the Royal Albert Hall
| Region | Certification | Certified units/sales |
|---|---|---|
| Australia (ARIA) video | Platinum | 15,000^{^} |
| Brazil (Pro-Música Brasil) video | Gold | 15,000^{*} |
| Ireland (IRMA) album | Gold | 7,500^{^} |
| United Kingdom (BPI) video | 2× Platinum | 100,000^{^} |
| United States (RIAA) video | Platinum | 100,000^{^} |
^{*} Sales figures based on certification alone.^{^} Shipments figures based on certification alone.

== Release history ==
Release dates and formats for Live from the Royal Albert Hall
| Region | Date | Format | Label |
|---|---|---|---|
| United States | November 3, 2009 | iTunes | Island |
| United Kingdom | November 9, 2009 | DVD/CD | Mercury |
| United States | November 10, 2009 | DVD/CD | Island |
| United States | November 10, 2009 | Blu-ray | Island |
