= Sam's Town Tour =

2006–07 concert tour by the Killers

- Tour by the Killers
- Poster announcing tour dates in early 2007
- Location: North America; Europe; Oceania; South America; Asia
- Associated album: Sam's Town, Sawdust
- Start date: August 23, 2006
- End date: November 14, 2007
- Legs: 12
- No. of shows: 80 in North America; 60 in Europe; 13 in Oceania; 5 in South America; 3 in Asia; Total: 161

The Killers concert chronology
- Hot Fuss Tour (2003–2005); Sam's Town Tour (2006–2007); Day & Age World Tour (2008–2010)

The Sam's Town Tour was the second major concert tour by Las Vegas-based rock band the Killers. The tour took place throughout 2006 and 2007 in support of the band's sophomore studio album Sam's Town, released in September 2006, as well as the band's 2007 compilation album Sawdust. The tour started on August 23, 2006, at the Celebrity Theater in Downtown Las Vegas, and ended on November 14, 2007, at Rod Laver Arena in Melbourne, playing over 150 shows in less than two years. The Sam's Town Tour also saw the band play in countries like Brazil, Argentina, and Chile for the first time.

== Background ==
The Sam's Town Tour was announced alongside Sam's Town's release date and track listing at a media gathering in New York on July 24, 2006. In the announcement, the band stated that they "will tour North America in October and begin a European jaunt November" and that they would be joined by Ted Sablay for the tour, stating: “[Ted] will be for us like Pat Smear was for Nirvana — he’ll play keys, guitar and sing a little bit. It will help us match the live versions a little closer to the album.” The tour was re-announced to the public in August of that year, with pre-sale tickets going up on September 14, and the rest of the tickets going on sale the next day on Ticketmaster.

A series of "warm-up shows" set to take place throughout August and September at smaller, intimate venues before the main tour had tickets quietly released in venue box offices in August. Most of the tickets were released just days before, with some venues like the Popscene Theater in San Francisco labeling the band as a "special surprise guest" who, according to Popscene co-founder Aaron Axelsen, didn't have "their identity [...] disclosed until they took the stage at the very intimate confines of [the Popscene Theater]."

The first warm-up show of the Sam's Town Tour took place at the Celebrity Theater on the Fremont Street Experience in Downtown Las Vegas on August 23, 2006. Songs such as "When You Were Young," "Read My Mind," and "For Reasons Unknown" were debuted live at the show, along with six others from Sam's Town. "Uncle Jonny" was debuted live at the Popscene Theater the following day, while "Why Do I Keep Counting" was debuted live in Japan in January 2007, and "This River Is Wild" in Australia in February of that year. The band played nine more warm-up shows throughout August and September, including the inaugural Virgin Festival in Baltimore on September 23.

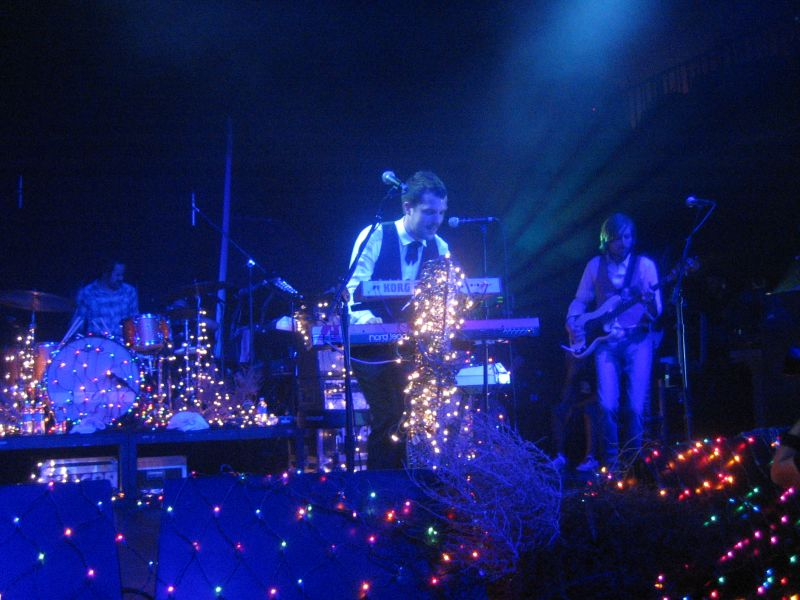
The Killers performing a warm-up show in August 2006

The Sam's Town Tour proper started in October 2006 with back-to-back shows at the Wiltern Theater in Los Angeles on October 6 and 7. The first North American leg of the tour, with bands such as Immigrant, the Envy Corps, and the Red Romance opening for the Killers on select dates, lasted throughout October and ended with a show at the Vegoose festival in Las Vegas on October 28.

The previously announced European tour leg of the tour, whose tickets sold out in just 5 minutes, began in November, touring in countries such as Germany, France, and the United Kingdom, with bands such as Howling Bells, The Brakes, and The Rapture opening for the Killers. The band further extended the Sam's Town Tour past the initial North American and European tour legs with a second North American leg in December 2006, a three-show run in Japan in January 2007, during which the official music video for "Read My Mind" was filmed, and an Oceania leg in January and February of that year.

In February 2007, during a show on a part of the second European leg of the tour, the Killers performed a cover of "Shadowplay" by Joy Division. The song, covered by the band for the 2007 biopic Control, became a staple of live shows throughout the rest of the Sam's Town Tour, the Day & Age World Tour, and the Battle Born World Tour, and would later go on to be released as the first single from their B-sides and rarities compilation album, Sawdust, released in November of that year. The band debuted the song "Tranquilize" from Sawdust on October 12, 2007, the same day the song was released as the second single from the album.

The Killers returned to Europe in February and March 2007, being joined by Black Rebel Motorcycle Club and Mumm-Ra as openers, and performing in the United Kingdom, Ireland, and the Netherlands. The band rebounded back to North America for a run of shows in the United States and Canada in April and May 2007, before performing a plethora of festival dates across Europe in the summer of 2007, including Greenfield, Glastonbury, and Oxegen. The band returned to North America in fall 2007, and then headlined the TIM Festival and Yeah Festival in Brazil and Argentina, respectively, as part of their first shows in South America. The band played a string of five shows in Australia to close out the tour, which ended on November 14 at Rod Laver Arena in Melbourne.

The Killers' "Murder Trilogy", consisting of "Leave the Bourbon on the Shelf" from Sawdust, as well as "Midnight Show" and "Jenny Was a Friend of Mine" from Hot Fuss, detailing the fictional story of the murder of a girl named Jenny at the hands of her deranged ex-boyfriend, was played in full twice during the Sam's Town Tour. The trilogy, which also marked the live debut of "Leave the Bourbon on the Shelf", was first played live on October 12, 2007, in Athens, being played in the show's encore. The trilogy was then played again on November 11 in Sydney, again being played near the end of the show. During both performances, the Killers performed "All These Things That I've Done" immediately following the trilogy, leading to speculation about its inclusion.

=== Festivals ===
The Killers played at a number of festivals throughout the Sam's Town Tour. The band first headlined the Virgin Festival in September 2006, and later went on to headline Big Day Out in January and February 2007, and the Glastonbury Festival in June. The band performed at a number of other festivals, including, but not limited to, Hove, Rock Werchter, Roskilde, V, and Austin City Limits. The band also performed at festivals during their inaugural South American leg of the tour.

== Reception ==
The Sam's Town Tour garnered fairly positive reviews from critics. Christian Hoard of Rolling Stone magazine remarked that the Killers' concert at Madison Square Garden "might pack more unfortunate big-rock bombast than its new wave debut, Hot Fuss, but it shares a generous hook quotient and a Vegas-y talent for crowd-pleasing. Before a frothy crowd, the Killers proved they've become a tight live band." Jeff Miller of Variety magazine reviewed the show at the Wiltern in Los Angeles, noting "the grand, sweeping epic reach of many songs [...] became a blessing live, with a stage show obviously designed for arenas mixing pomposity and intimacy." Kitty Empire at The Guardian attended the Killers' show in Glasgow and reported that "Flowers has taken the icy feeling from the Killers' first album and thawed it out, opening up their previously airless club-bound sound to the elements. And they tackle bigger themes - Flowers' father's drinking, horizon-sized regrets and betrayals - with the same gusto as they once did pithy love-gone-wrong songs."

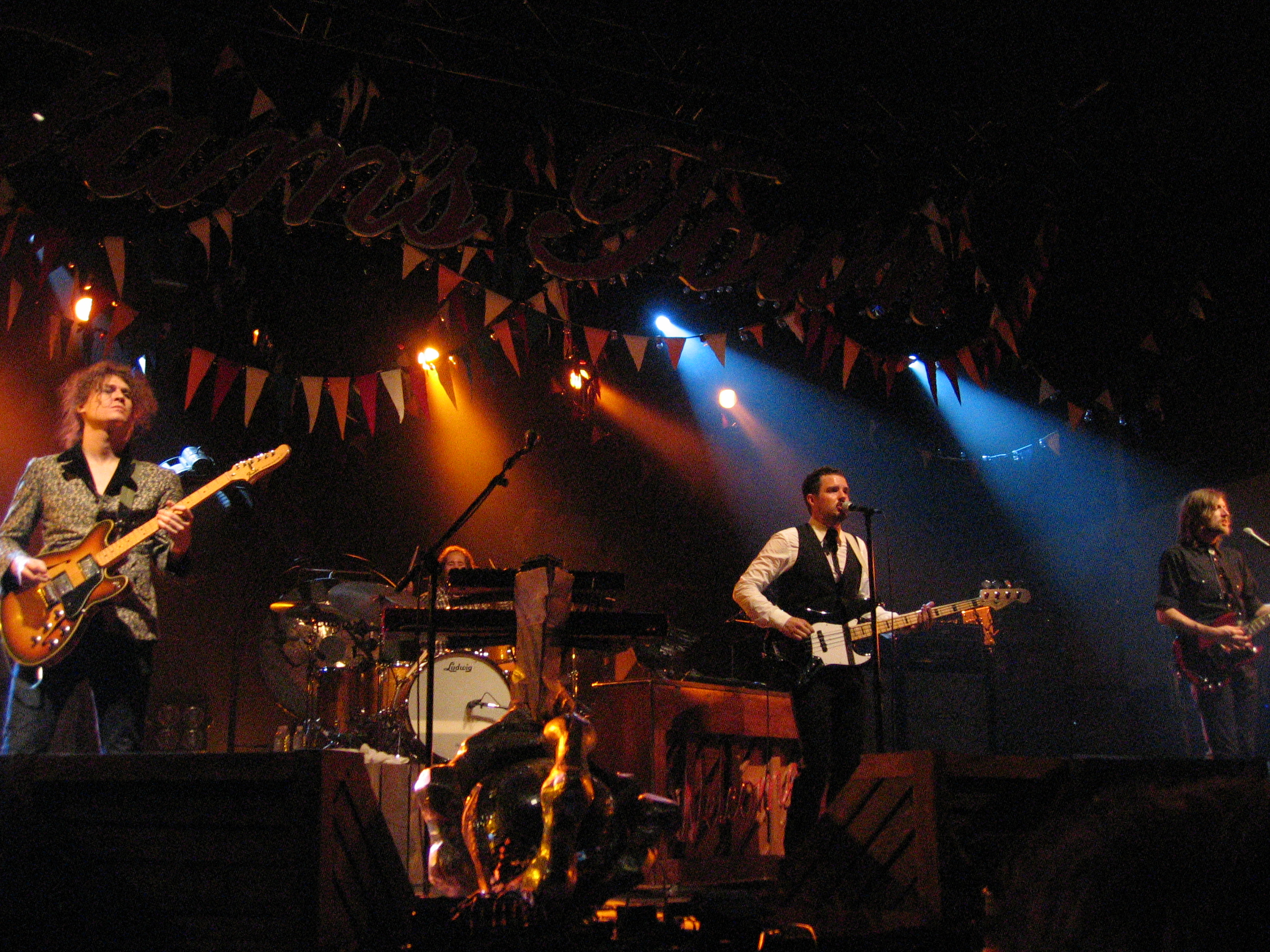
The Killers performing in October 2006

The New York Times assessed the Killers' show at Madison Square Garden, saying: "Although the band is from Las Vegas, it was drawn to the shameless artifice of British glam, new wave and the grander Britpop that followed it; with borrowed sounds, the Killers tapped into the gawky self-consciousness, the mixed yearning and irony, of adolescents grappling with grand passions," noting that "the Killers have learned their pop mechanics well: the pealing guitar lines, the big crescendos. Fans were singing along on all the older songs and some of the new ones, too." The Los Angeles Times reviewed a performance during the Sam's Town Tour, stating that "Flowers grew a thick push broom worthy of that record’s grandiloquent Americana. Drummer Ronnie Vannucci one-upped him with a fearsome Fu Manchu, and bassist Mark Stoermer let his blond scruff run wild. That album’s unapologetic Springsteen-philia proved something of a critical brick." In a review of a show at the Bill Graham Civic Auditorium in San Francisco, SFGate critiqued that "the Killers graduated into a proper arena band with an extremely sold out show at the Bill Graham Civic that left no grand rock 'n' roll cliche unturned" while also describing how "even as The Killers become the domain of backwards cap-wearing, beer-swilling dudes that high-five each other after every drum roll, singer Brandon Flowers still looks completely out of his league as the band's frontman."

== Personnel ==
Credits adapted from the Las Vegas Sun and Las Vegas Weekly.

=== The Killers ===
- Brandon Flowers – lead vocals, keyboards, piano, bass (on "For Reasons Unknown")
- Dave Keuning – lead guitar, background vocals
- Mark Stoermer – bass, background vocals, rhythm guitar (on "For Reasons Unknown")
- Ronnie Vannucci Jr. – drums, percussion, gong

=== Additional musicians ===
- Ted Sablay – keyboards, rhythm and lead guitar
- Rob Whited – percussion

== Set list ==
=== First set list ===
This set list of representative of the show on October 12, 2006, in Seattle. It is not intended to represent all shows from the tour.

1. "Sam's Town"
2. "Enterlude"
3. "When You Were Young"
4. "Somebody Told Me"
5. "Smile Like You Mean It"
6. "Bones"
7. "Bling (Confession of a King)"
8. "Read My Mind"
9. "Jenny Was a Friend of Mine"
10. "Uncle Jonny"
11. "Glamorous Indie Rock & Roll"
12. "Mr. Brightside"

Encore:

13. "My List"
14. "For Reasons Unknown"
15. "All These Things That I've Done"
16. "Exitlude"

=== Second set list ===
This set list of representative of the show on April 13, 2007, in Austin. It is not intended to represent all shows from the tour.

1. "Sam's Town"
2. "Enterlude"
3. "When You Were Young"
4. "Bones"
5. "Somebody Told Me"
6. "Smile Like You Mean It"
7. "Jenny Was a Friend of Mine"
8. "Uncle Jonny"
9. "This River is Wild"
10. "Read My Mind"
11. "On Top"
12. "Bling (Confession of a King)"
13. "Glamorous Indie Rock & Roll"
14. "Mr. Brightside"

Encore:

15. "My List"
16. "Shadowplay" (Joy Division cover)
17. "For Reasons Unknown"
18. "All These Things That I've Done"
19. "Exitlude"
20. "When You Were Young" (reprise)

=== Third set list ===
This set list of representative of the show on October 12, 2007, in Athens. It is not intended to represent all shows from the tour.

1. "Sam's Town"
2. "Enterlude"
3. "When You Were Young"
4. "Bones"
5. "Somebody Told Me"
6. "Smile Like You Mean It"
7. "For Reasons Unknown"
8. "Tranquilize"
9. "This River is Wild"
10. "Read My Mind"
11. "Shadowplay" (Joy Division cover)
12. "Bling (Confession of a King)"
13. "Mr. Brightside"

Encore:

14. "Leave the Bourbon on the Shelf"
15. "Midnight Show"
16. "Jenny Was a Friend of Mine"
17. "All These Things That I've Done"

== Tour dates ==
Date	City	Country	Venue	Opening act(s)
Warm-up dates
August 23, 2006	Las Vegas	United States	Celebrity Theater	—
August 24, 2006	San Francisco	United States	Popscene	—
August 25, 2006	West Hollywood	United States	The Troubadour	—
August 26, 2006	Las Vegas	United States	Empire Ballroom	—
September 8, 2006	Blackpool	United Kingdom	Empress Ballroom	—
September 14, 2006	Cologne	Germany	Yard Club	—
September 15, 2006	Berlin	Germany	E-Werk	—
September 18, 2006	London	United Kingdom	Electric Ballroom	—
September 22, 2006	New York City	United States	Webster Hall	—
September 23, 2006 (Note: This concert was a part of the "Virgin Festival".)	Baltimore	United States	Pimlico Race Course	—
North America I
October 6, 2006	Los Angeles	United States	Wiltern	Immigrant
October 7, 2006	Los Angeles	United States	Wiltern	Immigrant
October 8, 2006	San Francisco	United States	The Warfield	Immigrant
October 9, 2006	San Francisco	United States	The Warfield	Immigrant
October 10, 2006	Portland	United States	Roseland Theatre	Immigrant
October 11, 2006	Vancouver	Canada	Orpheum Theatre	Immigrant
October 12, 2006	Seattle	United States	Paramount Theatre	Immigrant
October 14, 2006	Magna	United States	The Great Salt Air	The Envy Corps
October 15, 2006	Denver	United States	Fillmore Auditorium	The Envy Corps
October 17, 2006	Chicago	United States	Congress Theater	The Envy Corps
October 18, 2006	Detroit	United States	State Theatre	The Envy Corps
October 20, 2006	Toronto	Canada	Kool Haus	—
October 21, 2006	Atlantic City	United States	Borgata Events Center	The Red Romance
October 24, 2006	New York City	United States	Madison Square Garden	The Red Romance
October 25, 2006	New York City	United States	Madison Square Garden	The Red Romance
October 26, 2006	Boston	United States	Orpheum Theatre	The Red Romance
October 28, 2006 (Note: This concert was a part of "Vegoose".)	Las Vegas	United States	Sam Boyd Stadium	—
Europe I
November 1, 2006	Copenhagen	Denmark	Vega	—
November 3, 2006	Hamburg	Germany	Große Freiheit 36	Howling Bells
November 4, 2006	Berlin	Germany	Huxley's Neue Welt	Howling Bells
November 5, 2006	Cologne	Germany	E-Werk	Howling Bells
November 7, 2006	Munich	Germany	Tonhalle	Howling Bells
November 8, 2006	Milan	Italy	Rolling Stone	Howling Bells
November 9, 2006	Zürich	Switzerland	X-tra	Howling Bells
November 11, 2006	Barcelona	Spain	Razzmatazz	Howling Bells
November 14, 2006	Brussels	Belgium	Ancienne Belgique	The Brakes
November 15, 2006	Paris	France	Bataclan	The Brakes
November 16, 2006	Amsterdam	Netherlands	Paradiso	The Brakes
November 18, 2006	Wolverhampton	United Kingdom	Wolverhampton Civic Hall	The Brakes
November 20, 2006	Manchester	United Kingdom	Manchester Apollo	The Brakes
November 21, 2006	Hull	United Kingdom	Hull Arena	The Brakes
November 22, 2006	Glasgow	United Kingdom	Glasgow Academy	The Brakes
November 23, 2006	Newcastle	United Kingdom	Newcastle Academy	The Broken Stars
November 25, 2006	Nottingham	United Kingdom	Rock City	The Broken Stars
November 26, 2006	London	United Kingdom	Brixton Academy	The Broken Stars, The Rapture
November 27, 2006	London	United Kingdom	Brixton Academy	The Broken Stars, The Rapture
November 28, 2006	London	United Kingdom	Brixton Academy	The Broken Stars, The Rapture
North America II
December 8, 2006 (Note: This concert was a part of "Not So Silent Night".)	San Francisco	United States	Bill Graham Civic Auditorium	—
December 10, 2006 (Note: This concert was a part of "KROQ Almost Acoustic Christmas".)	Los Angeles	United States	Gibson Amphitheatre	—
December 12, 2006	Monterrey	Mexico	Monterrey Arena	—
December 13, 2006	Mexico City	Mexico	Palacio de los Deportes	—
December 15, 2006 (Note: This concert was a part of the "Z100 Jingle Ball".)	New York City	United States	Madison Square Garden	—
December 16, 2006	Philadelphia	United States	Electric Factory	—
December 18, 2006 (Note: This concert was a part of the "99X Mistletoe Jam".)	Atlanta	United States	Philips Arena	—
Asia
January 13, 2007	Tokyo	Japan	Zepp	—
January 14, 2007	Nagoya	Japan	Diamond Hall	—
January 15, 2007	Osaka	Japan	Nanba Hatch	—
Oceania I
January 19, 2007 (Note: This concert was a part of the "Big Day Out".)	Auckland	New Zealand	Mount Smart Stadium	—
January 21, 2007	Gold Coast	Australia	Gold Coast Parklands	—
January 25, 2007	Sydney	Australia	Sydney Showground Stadium	—
January 26, 2007	Sydney	Australia	Hordern Pavilion	—
January 28, 2007	Melbourne	Australia	Princes Park South	—
February 1, 2007	Melbourne	Australia	Festival Hall	—
February 2, 2007	Adelaide	Australia	Adelaide Showgrounds	—
February 4, 2007	Perth	Australia	Claremont Showground	—
Europe II
February 16, 2007	Sheffield	United Kingdom	Sheffield Arena	Black Rebel Motorcycle Club
February 17, 2007	Manchester	United Kingdom	M.E.N. Arena	Black Rebel Motorcycle Club
February 18, 2007	Birmingham	United Kingdom	NEC Arena	Black Rebel Motorcycle Club
February 20, 2007	Newcastle	United Kingdom	Metro Radio Arena	Black Rebel Motorcycle Club
February 21, 2007	Aberdeen	United Kingdom	AECC	Black Rebel Motorcycle Club
February 22, 2007	Glasgow	United Kingdom	SECC	Black Rebel Motorcycle Club
February 24, 2007	London	United Kingdom	Wembley Arena	Black Rebel Motorcycle Club
February 25, 2007	London	United Kingdom	Wembley Arena	Black Rebel Motorcycle Club
February 27, 2007	Dublin	Ireland	RDS Main Hall	Black Rebel Motorcycle Club
February 28, 2007	Dublin	Ireland	RDS Main Hall	Black Rebel Motorcycle Club
March 3, 2007	Brighton	United Kingdom	Brighton Centre	Black Rebel Motorcycle Club
March 4, 2007	Nottingham	United Kingdom	National Ice Centre	Black Rebel Motorcycle Club
March 5, 2007	Cardiff	United Kingdom	Cardiff International Arena	Black Rebel Motorcycle Club
March 7, 2007	Amsterdam	Netherlands	Heineken Music Hall	Mumm-Ra
March 9, 2007	Cologne	Germany	Palladium	Mumm-Ra
March 10, 2007	Berlin	Germany	Columbiahalle	Mumm-Ra
March 11, 2007	Frankfurt	Germany	Jahrhunderthalle Höchst	Mumm-Ra
March 12, 2007	Paris	France	Zénith de Paris	—
March 15, 2007	Lille	France	L'Aéronef	—
North America III
April 6, 2007	Santa Barbara	United States	UC Santa Barbara Events Center	Howling Bells
April 7, 2007	San Francisco	United States	Bill Graham Civic Auditorium	Howling Bells
April 9, 2007	Los Angeles	United States	Staples Center	Howling Bells
April 10, 2007	San Diego	United States	RIMAC Arena	Howling Bells
April 11, 2007	Phoenix	United States	Dodge Theatre	Howling Bells
April 13, 2007	Austin	United States	Frank Erwin Center	Howling Bells
April 15, 2007 (Note: This concert was a part of the "EdgeFest".)	Frisco	United States	FC Dallas Stadium	Howling Bells
April 18, 2007	Tampa	United States	USF Sun Dome	Howling Bells, The Rapture
April 19, 2007	Hollywood	United States	Hard Rock Live	Howling Bells, The Rapture
April 20, 2007	Orlando	United States	UCF Arena	Howling Bells, The Rapture
April 22, 2007	Atlanta	United States	Fox Theatre	Silver Beats
April 23, 2007	Nashville	United States	Ryman Auditorium	Silver Beats
April 26, 2007	Fairfax	United States	Patriot Theater	Silver Beats, The Red Romance
April 27, 2007	Camden	United States	Tweeter Center	Silver Beats, The Red Romance
April 28, 2007	New York City	United States	Madison Square Garden	Silver Beats, The Red Romance
April 29, 2007	Lowell	United States	Paul E. Tsongas Arena	Silver Beats, The Red Romance
May 5, 2007	Atlantic City	United States	Borgota Events Center	The Red Romance
May 6, 2007	Montreal	Canada	Bell Centre	The Red Romance
May 7, 2007	Toronto	Canada	Air Canada Centre	The Red Romance
May 9, 2007	Detroit	United States	Fox Theatre	The Red Romance
May 10, 2007	Hoffman Estates	United States	Sears Centre	The Red Romance
May 11, 2007	Kansas City	United States	City Market	The Red Romance
May 12, 2007 (Note: This concert was a part of "Pointfest".)	Maryland Heights	United States	Verizon Wireless Amphitheater	—
May 14, 2007	Des Moines	United States	Val Air Ballroom	The Envy Corps
May 15, 2007	Saint Paul	United States	Roy Wilkins Auditorium	The Envy Corps
May 21, 2007	Vancouver	Canada	Thunderbird Stadium	Hot Hot Heat
May 23, 2007	Edmonton	Canada	Rexall Place	Hot Hot Heat
May 24, 2007	Calgary	Canada	Pengrowth Saddledome	Hot Hot Heat
May 26, 2007	Portland	United States	Keller Auditorium	Louis XIV
May 27, 2007	Seattle	United States	WaMu Theater	Louis XIV
May 29, 2007	Sacramento	United States	Memorial Auditorium	Louis XIV
May 31, 2007	Magna	United States	The Great Salt Air	Louis XIV
June 1, 2007	Las Vegas	United States	The Joint @ Hard Rock	Louis XIV
Europe III
June 12, 2007 (Note: This concert was a part of the "PepeWorld Festival".)	Madrid	Spain	Plaza de Toros La Cubierta	—
June 16, 2007 (Note: This concert was a part of the "Greenfield Festival".)	Interlaken	Switzerland	Interlaken Airfield	—
June 17, 2007 (Note: This concert was a part of the "Nova Rock Festival".)	Nickelsdorf	Austria	Patagonia Fields	—
June 23, 2007 (Note: This concert was a part of "Glastonbury Festival".)	Pilton	United Kingdom	Glastonbury Festival	—
June 24, 2007 (Note: This concert was a part of the "Rock-A-Field Festival".)	Roeser	Luxembourg	Rock-A-Field	—
June 26, 2007	Helsinki	Finland	Helsinki Ice Hall	—
June 27, 2007 (Note: This concert was a part of the "Hove Festival".)	Arendal	Norway	Tromøy	—
June 30, 2007 (Note: This concert was a part of "Rock Werchter".)	Leuven	Belgium	Werchter	—
July 4, 2007 (Note: This concert was a part of the "Rock for People".)	Hradec Králové	Czech Republic	Věkoše Airport	—
July 5, 2007 (Note: This concert was a part of the "Roskilde Festival".)	Roskilde	Denmark	Roskilde Festival	—
July 7, 2007 (Note: This concert was a part of "T in the Park".)	Kinross	United Kingdom	Balado	—
July 8, 2007 (Note: This concert was a part of "Oxegen".)	Naas	Ireland	Punchestown Racecourse	—
August 14, 2007 (Note: This concert was a part of the "Sziget Festival".)	Budapest	Hungary	Óbuda Island	—
August 17, 2007 (Note: This concert was a part of the "Lowlands Festival".)	Biddinghuizen	Netherlands	Spijk en Bremerberg	—
August 18, 2007 (Note: This concert was a part of the "V Festival".)	Weston-under-Lizard	United Kingdom	Weston Park	—
August 19, 2007	Chelmsford	United Kingdom	Hylands Park	—
August 22, 2007 (Note: This concert was a part of "Tennent's Vital".)	Belfast	United Kingdom	Ormeau Park	—
North America IV
September 3, 2007	Boulder	United States	Fox Theatre	Louis XIV
September 4, 2007	Morrison	United States	Red Rocks Amphitheatre	Louis XIV
September 5, 2007	Council Bluffs	United States	Mid-America Center	Louis XIV
September 7, 2007	Cleveland	United States	Wolstein Center	Louis XIV
September 8, 2007	Columbus	United States	Lifestyle Communities Pavilion	Louis XIV
September 9, 2007	Toronto	Canada	Island Park	Louis XIV
September 11, 2007	Louisville	United States	The Louisville Palace	Louis XIV
September 13, 2007	Grand Prairie	United States	Nokia Theater	Louis XIV
September 14, 2007 (Note: This concert was a part of the "Austin City Limits Music Festival".)	Austin	United States	Zilker Park	Louis XIV
September 15, 2007	Houston	United States	Reliant Center	Louis XIV
September 17, 2007	El Paso	United States	Chavez Theatre	Louis XIV
September 21, 2007	Lake Tahoe	United States	Mont Bleu	Louis XIV
September 23, 2007 (Note: This concert was a part of "Street Scene".)	San Diego	United States	Del Mar Fairgrounds	Louis XIV
October 12, 2007	Athens	United States	40 Watt Club	Louis XIV
October 13, 2007 (Note: This concert was a part of "The Echo Project".)	Fairburn	United States	Bouckeart Farm	Louis XIV
October 19, 2007 (Note: This concert was a part of "Festival Motorokrfest".)	Mexico City	Mexico	Foro Sol	Louis XIV
October 21, 2007	Guadalajara	Mexico	Telmex Auditorium	Louis XIV
South America
October 27, 2007 (Note: This concert was a part of the "TIM Festival".)	Rio de Janeiro	Brazil	Marina da Glória	—
October 28, 2007	São Paulo	Brazil	Arena Skol Anhembi	—
October 31, 2007	Curitiba	Brazil	Pedreira Paulo Leminski	—
November 2, 2007 (Note: This concert was a part of the "Yeah Festival".)	Buenos Aires	Argentina	José Amalfitani Stadium	—
November 4, 2007	Santiago	Chile	Pista Atletica	—
Oceania II
November 9, 2007	Brisbane	Australia	Brisbane Entertainment Centre	Louis XIV
November 10, 2007	Sydney	Australia	Sydney Entertainment Centre	Louis XIV
November 11, 2007	Sydney	Australia	Sydney Entertainment Centre	Louis XIV
November 13, 2007	Melbourne	Australia	Rod Laver Arena	Louis XIV
November 14, 2007	Melbourne	Australia	Rod Laver Arena	Louis XIV
