= The Red Romance =

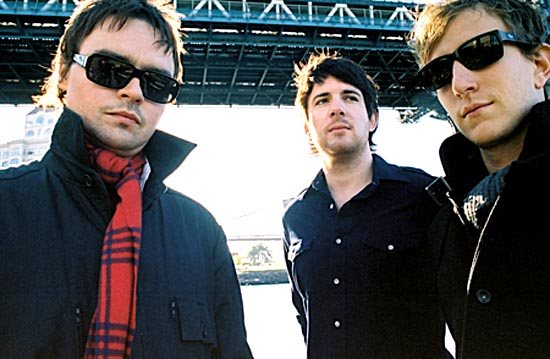

Background information
- Origin: New York, New York, United States
- Genres: Indie pop, pop, rock
- Years active: 2006—present
- Members: Matthew Dublin; Darren Beckett; Adam Chilenski
- Website: The Red Romance.com

The Red Romance is an American, New York City-based pop and rock band, formed in late 2006.

== History ==
The Red Romance is an independently released act who feature a blend of Motown-oriented grooves and lyrical moodiness.

Formerly of New York based indie-rock group Ambulance LTD, Matthew Dublin and Darren Beckett formed The Red Romance using a song catalog Dublin had assembled while on tour with their previous band. Soon after recording some demos, the band recruited Adam Chilenski and began playing shows at NYC clubs the Mercury Lounge and Piano's.

At an early show at NYC's downtown club Piano's, Spin.com editor Peter Gaston wrote "I caught the band at Pianos on the Lower East Side last night, almost by accident, and was completely excited about the Red Romance's future. It's classic rock'n'roll, anchored by Beckett's rock steady, Motown-influenced backbeats... the sly chorus on "What You Wanted" shows [Dublin's] got a bit of attitude to share".

The band continued with an impromptu jam with Brandon Flowers from The Killers at NYC's the Mercury Lounge, where they jammed some of their favorites, including David Bowie's "Heroes". Always supporters of The Red Romance, The Killers then asked the young band to accompany them as a support act on the band's Sam's Town Tour to promote their sophomore release Sam's Town. It was during this tour that The Red Romance became one of the first unsigned act to perform at Madison Square Garden's three times, two at Madison Square Theater and then in the arena proper. Some early live reviews described the then virtually unknown band's ability to rise to the challenge and break the ice in front of thousands of Killers fans: "The Red Romance proved to be a good compliment to The Killers with a slew of easy to digest songs with some hooks and melodies, but enough bite as well. And by the end of their set, the growing crowd apparently agreed giving Red Romance a good, well-deserved hand amidst potentially difficult circumstances".

They performed on September 9, 2007 in Toronto as part of the Virgin Festival.

At CMJ 2007, Spin.com praised The Red Romance's performance at a showcase featuring several up-and-coming bands as "...the evening's tightest performance. Sporting a suit vest and button up, front man Matt Dublin and crew kicked into a solid set of back to back tracks from the newly minted quintet's self-titled debut. "Don’t Cry" and "Just One Kiss" illustrate Dublin's affinity for the finer things in life: pop hooks and all their trimmings. At a skin and bones level, the Red Romance's tunes embody cut and dried musical infection. And "Break Away" exemplifies its zenith; a thick frosting of synths and simple, hum-worthy lead guitars float atop a solid Motown bass and back beat spine—something other bands often refuse to do: accept simplicity. True, turning heads with a common mold is tough, but it's tried and true, and Red Romance showed us why." The Times music writer Dan Cairns also praised the band's departure from their former outfit, writing that "...The RR’s debut EP shares little with that band’s lilting dream-rock, instead owing debts to The Cure and The Strokes, with nods, too, to classic Motown and Duran Duran, all fed through a synth-pop filter. . .the RR will need all the friends they can get. Their EP suggests they won’t lack for them."

Critic's have described Dublin's songwriting style with a wide range of influences, including jangly guitar pop, Motown, and "...the kind of indie pop/rock outfit that makes you want to breakout in a nostalgic Molly Ringwald dance a la The Breakfast Club”. This earned the band much critical praise during a brief tour of the UK in April 2008 in support of another three-song self-titled EP released via digital download on May 26, 2008. Interest was generated from The Red Romance in London both due to underground popularity of their five-song EP and their former membership in Ambulance LTD, which had toured extensively in the UK. The London Metro described the Dublin and Beckett's new group as a "far less arty, more dancey outfit-and they've managed it winningly if their debut EP is anything to go by..It features the chart-friendly "Kinda Feel Right"-a springy indie number coplin 1980s guitar pop with doom laden moodiness-and the rather synthy "Hesitate." No wonder The Killers chose them as support on tour". The Fly also took note of the band's material, "...it's a pleasure to welcome New York's The Red Romance to the UK. We're in bittersweet 80s pop territory here-'Hesitate' even brings to mind ABC and Haircut 100...daytime radio's their oyster at this rate."

== Releases ==
- Self-titled five song EP March 2007
- Self-titled three song EP April 2008

== Members ==
- Matthew Dublin – vocals, guitar, songwriter
- Darren Beckett – drums
- Adam Chilenski – bass, backing vocals
