= Enterlude and Exitlude =

Pair of 2006 songs by the Killers

"Enterlude / Exitlude"

Songs by the Killers

from the album Sam's Town
- Released: September 27, 2006
- Recorded: 2006
- Studio: Studio at the Palms (Las Vegas)
- Genre: Art song
- Length: 0:49 ("Enterlude"); 2:24 ("Exitlude")
- Label: Island
- Songwriter: Brandon Flowers
- Producers: Flood; Alan Moulder; the Killers

"Enterlude" and "Exitlude" are a pair of joint songs by American rock band the Killers. They are the second and closing track, respectively, from the band's sophomore studio album, Sam's Town (2006). Both songs were written by frontman Brandon Flowers and produced by Flood, Alan Moulder, and the Killers. "Enterlude" is the shortest song in the Killers' discography. The songs have become a popular staple in American streaming culture, most notably associated with Technoblade and xQc.

== Background ==
"Enterlude" and "Exitlude" were written by frontman Brandon Flowers while the Killers "were recording in a hotel casino and [Flowers] was messing around on a piano. Next to [him] was a room key-card that said 'we hope you enjoy your stay' on it, and it all just took off from there." According to Flowers, the melody of Enterlude "came from a dream ... It sounds ridiculous but it was Kurt Cobain on a ship, in the clouds! He was singing this melody and I remember thinking he sounded like Bob Dylan, so that made it even weirder!" Flowers also remarked that "'Enterlude' is just a nice refrain ... almost like the beginning of a sitcom or a movie where you're welcomed into the place before you see the credits. That's what it feels like." The final piano note of "Enterlude" segues into the opening riff of "When You Were Young".

Flowers described "Exitlude" as "beautiful", saying: "I think the beauty of the Exitlude is there's sadness to it but it's not over. You want to go back to Sam's Town and I do too." He also compared "Exitlude" to the theme tune from the sitcom Cheers.

The songs have been described as "bookends" to Sam's Town, similar to that of "Sgt. Pepper's Lonely Hearts Club Band" and its reprise from the Beatles' 1967 album of the same name, as well as "In the Flesh?" and "In the Flesh" from Pink Floyd's The Wall.

== Release and reception ==
"Enterlude" and "Exitlude" were released alongside the rest of Sam's Town on September 27, 2006 in Japan, and October 3 in the United States. The songs received mostly positive reviews from critics. Pitchfork magazine called the songs "bookends that aspire to set these songs within a setting that may or may not be based on the Vegas townie casino of the album's title," yet PopMatters described them as "pointless, self-indulgent bookends for a nonexistent concept album." NME approved of the songs, remarking that they are like "tongue-in-cheek greeting and goodbye, designed as if they're serenading you from the stage of some tacky, past-its-prime casino bar," while The Young Folks webzine praised the songs, saying that "after Flowers sings [Enterlude], you can't help but eagerly wonder what that stay will entail." Rob Sheffield of the Rolling Stone, who rated Sam's Town 2 out of 5 stars, proclaimed that "'Enterlude' and 'Exitlude' frame the album with a vague hotel/casino theme, but the concept adds up to nothing except faux-Boss cliches already picked clean by Eighties never-weres from Lone Justice to John Eddie."

== In popular culture ==
American YouTuber Technoblade, who died from metastatic sarcoma in June 2022, requested for his father to use "Exitlude" in the video announcing his death. However, his father, known online as Technodad, revealed the song was left out of the video due to copyright reasons, instead linking the song on a post on the r/technoblade subreddit.

Canadian streamer Félix Lengyel, better known as xQc, has regularly used "Exitlude" as outro music for his streams since 2018. Lengyel has stated that he isn't a fan of the Killers and he "only likes Exitlude."

== Live performances ==
"Enterlude" and "Exitlude" both had their live debut at the Celebrity Theater on the Fremont Street Experience in Downtown Las Vegas on August 23, 2006. Both songs were frequently played throughout the Sam's Town Tour in 2006 and 2007. "Enterlude" was then commonly played during the Imploding the Mirage Tour from 2021 to 2023, usually being played as the second song of the show following "My Own Soul's Warning". Both songs saw a rise in performances during the Rebel Diamonds Tour in 2024, with "Enterlude" being performed 14 times and "Exitlude" 12 times during the tour.

"Enterlude" and "Exitlude" were performed at the Royal Albert Hall in London on July 6, 2009 to an empty venue for the DVD release of Live from the Royal Albert Hall (2009).

== Credits and personnel ==
Credits adapted from the liner notes of Sam's Town.

=== The Killers ===
- Brandon Flowers
- Dave Keuning
- Mark Stoermer
- Ronnie Vannucci Jr.

=== Technical ===
- Flood – production, recording, mixing
- Alan Moulder – production, recording, mixing
- The Killers – production
- Howie Weinberg – mastering

=== Studios ===
- Studio at the Palms (Las Vegas, Nevada) – recording
- Assault & Battery (London) – mixing
- Masterdisk (New York City) – mastering
