= Bling (Confession of a King) =

Song by the Killers

from the album Sam's Town
- Released: September 27, 2006
- Recorded: 2006
- Studio: Studio at the Palms (Las Vegas)
- Genre: Alternative rock; anthemic rock; heartland rock
- Length: 4:08
- Label: Island
- Songwriters: Brandon Flowers; Mark Stoermer
- Producers: Flood; Alan Moulder; the Killers

"Bling (Confession of a King)" is a song by American rock band the Killers. It is the fourth track from the band's sophomore album, Sam's Town (2006). The song was written by frontman Brandon Flowers and bassist Mark Stoermer, and produced by Flood, Alan Moulder and the Killers. Despite not being a single, "Bling" is one of the Killers' most popular songs, being played live over 450 times as of October 2025.

== Background ==
"Bling" is written in the key of D major. The song was written by frontman Brandon Flowers and bassist Mark Stoermer, and was produced by Flood, Alan Moulder, and the Killers, the three of whom produced the entirety of Sam's Town. In an interview with The Guardian, Flowers remarked that "Bling" is actually chronicling the "victorious story of [his] dad forswearing–overnight–alcoholism and Catholicism to become a Mormon when Brandon was five." In terms of genre, "Bling" has been described as alternative rock,anthemic rock, and heartland rock, with its sound also being attributed to artists such as Springsteen.

== Release and reception ==
"Bling" was released alongside the rest of Sam's Town on September 27, 2006 in Japan, and October 3 in the US. The song received positive reviews from critics. "Bling" was compared to Springsteen by Slant magazine and The Independent. who described the song as "Springsteen-esque" and similar to "Bruce Springsteen [with a] big, vaulting chorus and bombastic tone", respectively. Bring the Noise UK praised "Bling" for having "cold pianos and Flowers belting out lyrics that struggle to cope with the feeling of failure [...] in stunning solo style," noting that the song "gets its warm glow going with parading percussion, racing bass and guitars, and self-assured singing courtesy of the quartet". Krissi Murison of NME remarked that "Bling" is "basically ‘Knights of Cydonia’ minus Matt Bellamy’s squawking".

== Live performances ==
"Bling" has been played live 476 times as of October 2025. It was first played live at the Celebrity Theater in Las Vegas, Nevada on August 23, 2006, alongside most of the rest of Sam's Town, around a month before its release. The song was mostly played during the Sam's Town Tour throughout 2006 and 2007, as well as the Day & Age World Tour from 2008-2010. "Bling" is commonly played after "Spaceman", "Human", or "Smile Like You Mean It". The Killers' performances of "Bling" at the Royal Albert Hall on July 5 and 6, 2009 were included on the DVD video and live album Live from the Royal Albert Hall (2009).

== Credits and personnel ==
Credits adapted from the liner notes of Sam's Town.

=== The Killers ===
- Brandon Flowers
- Dave Keuning
- Mark Stoermer
- Ronnie Vannucci Jr.

=== Technical ===
- Flood – production, recording, mixing
- Alan Moulder – production, recording, mixing
- The Killers – production
- Howie Weinberg – mastering

=== Studios ===
- Studio at the Palms (Las Vegas, Nevada) – recording
- Assault & Battery (London) – mixing
- Masterdisk (New York City) – mastering
