= Kyoto Protocol (band) =

Malaysian rock band

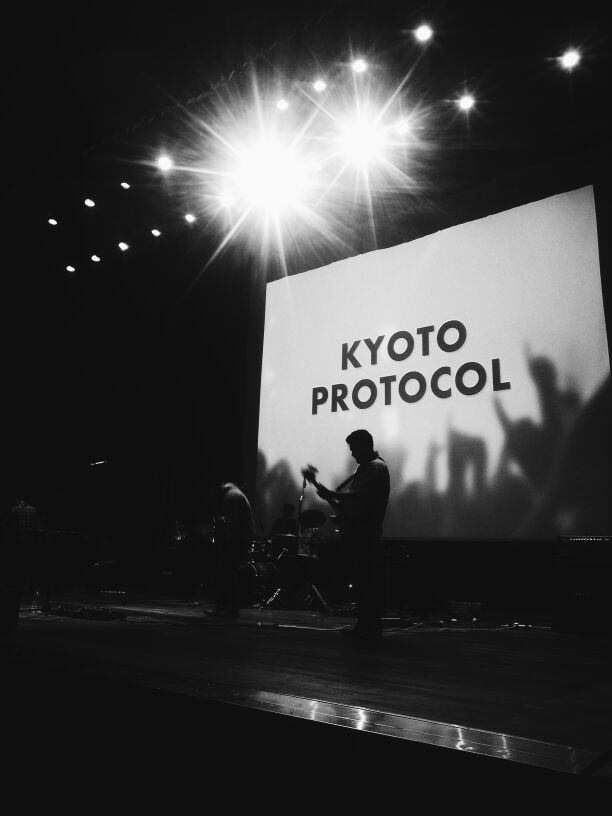
- Kyoto Protocol performing at Multimedia University (Cyberjaya) in 2014

Background information
- Origin: Kuala Lumpur, Malaysia
- Genres: Rock and roll Alternative rock Pop punk Indie rock
- Years active: 2009–present
- Label: unsigned
- Members: Fuad Alhabshi; Gael Oliveres; Hairi Haneefa; Shakeil Bashir (Shaq); Shanjeev Reddy (Shan)
- Website: www.kyotoband.com www.facebook.com/kyotoprotocol www.twitter.com/KyotoBand

Kyoto Protocol is a Malaysian rock band from Kuala Lumpur formed in 2009. The band consists of lead vocalist and guitarist Fuad, back-up vocalist/keyboard player Gael, guitarist Hairi, bassist Shakeil, and drummer Shan.

In 2011, Kyoto Protocol received a nomination in the 'Best New Artist' category from the Anugerah Industri Muzik following the success of their EP titled "An Album" in the same year. Its lead single "Pussycat" peaked at No.1 on Hitz.FM's Malaysian English Top 10, the FlyFM Campur Charts and TraxxFM's Upstage Charts.

== History ==
=== 2009-2011: Formation and early days ===
Kyoto Protocol was formed in 2009 by Fuad, Gael, Hairi, Shaq and Shan. The band won 1st place in the Yamaha Asian Beat 2009 Central Regional Finals. In the subsequent National Finals, however, they narrowly missed out on the top spot and the chance to represent Malaysia in the Asian Beat Grand Finals in Japan, settling for runner-up instead. In 2011, they were hand-picked to be the opening act for in MGMT's maiden concert in Kuala Lumpur, their first exposure to the big stage. Since then, they adapted quickly and in the process racked up impressive accolades including coveted slots at Future Music Festival Asia, Rockaway and Urbanscapes.

=== 2011-2012: An Album ===
In June 2011, Kyoto Protocol released “An Album”, a 5-track EP, under Monsoon Records who spotted them making the rounds in the local gigging circuit. Their first single from the album “Pussycat” garnered heavy rotation on the airwaves, even reaching number 1 on the Hitz.FM's Malaysian English Top 10, FlyFM's Campur Chart and TraxxFM's Upstage Charts. Subsequently, the band received a nomination for “Best New Artist” from Anugerah Industri Muzik (AIM) in the same year, building on the success of “An Album”.

They were also one of the opening acts for We The Kings and We Are The In Crowd, alongside Bunkface and Oh Chentaku on 30 May 2012 at the Bukit Jalil Stadium.

=== 2013-2014 ===
In March 2013, the band kickstarted proceedings at the Flamingo Stage of Future Music Festival Asia, held in Sepang, Malaysia. They shared the stage with big international acts that included Grammy nominees Fun., British indie rock band Bloc Party, and Australian goliaths The Temper Trap, amongst others. Future Music Festival Asia is currently the only instalment of the Future Music Festival franchise outside of Australia. The band performed a couple new tracks, in a preview to a potential upcoming album rumoured to be released in late 2013.

In April 2013, they participated as contestants for the second season of Versus -a TV9 reality show where obscure bands compete against each other- where they reached second place. In August of the same year, they rubbed shoulders with international acts like Smashing Pumpkins and Modest Mouse for Good Vibes Festival that was held in Sepang. Also, they officially released brand new EP entitled "Pahlawan" featuring few songs from "Versus" and also a brand new track with Liyana Fizi, "Jelita". Meanwhile, in September 2013, they are the opening act for The Killers held in Helipad, Sepang. Now they are focusing on their upcoming album that is expected to be released in 2014.

In May 2014, the band released their brand new song, "Dispensable" exclusively on Deezer and later released on iTunes. The song is from their upcoming album entitled "Catch These Men", set to be released in late 2014. In September 2014, the band has confirmed that the completion of their album. So far, the confirmed tracks on the album is "Dispensable", "Still Alive", "An Honest Day" and the new one, "Monster's Ball" which the band debut the song live at their recent show in Shah Alam, Selangor for Proton's "Alami Proton" event. In October 2014, the album officially completed mixing and mastering by Faiz Fadzil of The Wknd.

=== 2015-2017: Catch These Men ===
In January 2015, the band officially announced their tour in February 2015 for their new album, "Catch These Men". The band toured in Johor Bahru, Kuala Lumpur, Penang and Ipoh.

=== 2017-2018: The Pen is Mightier ===
Kyoto Protocol went back into the studio and started writing new songs in 2017 and started recording at Maverick Studio towards the end of 2017. They released their first single from their upcoming album in July 2018 entitled "Delta Wing". The song was released on Spotify, Deezer, & Apple Music, and made it into New Music Friday (Malaysia) on Spotify which marked the return of Kyoto Protocol on the big stage. They then released the following single "Guilty Plea" in October 2018, and followed that release with another single "The End" in December, in conjunction with the full "The Pen is Mightier" album launch. "The End" was selected for New Music Friday on Spotify across multiple countries in Asia, including Malaysia, Singapore, Vietnam, Indonesia, Thailand and Philippines, and also made it to the Top Hits Malaysia playlist.

To commemorate the launch of "The Pen is Mightier", Kyoto Protocol went on a National Tour in November to December 2018 which included shows in Kuala Lumpur, Penang, Ipoh, Johor Bahru, Kuching, Miri and Kota Kinabalu.

== Band members ==
- Fuad Alhabshi
- Gael Oliveres
- Hairi Haneefa
- Shakeil Bashir (Shaq)
- Shanjeev Reddy (Shan)

== Discography ==
EP

- An Album (2011)

Studio album

- Catch These Men (2015)
- The Pen is Mightier (2018)
