= Shadowplay (song) =

Song by Joy Division

Song by Joy Division

from the album Unknown Pleasures
- Released: 15 June 1979
- Recorded: 1–17 April 1979
- Studio: Strawberry, Stockport
- Genre: Gothic rock; post-punk
- Length: 3:55
- Label: Factory
- Songwriters: Bernard Sumner; Peter Hook; Stephen Morris; Ian Curtis
- Producers: Martin Hannett, Joy Division

Reimagined video
- "Shadowplay" on YouTube

"Shadowplay" is a song by the English rock band Joy Division. The song appeared on their debut studio album, Unknown Pleasures, released on 15 June 1979. Previously, Joy Division played "Shadowplay" live on their first television appearance on Granada TV in September 1978. It was later featured on the compilation album Silhouettes and Statues.

== Lyrics ==
Early recordings of the lyrics on the Warsaw album show the first line of the song as saying "To the centre of the city where all roads meet looking for you". In later recordings the word looking is replaced with waiting.

== The Killers version ==
"Shadowplay"

Single by The Killers

from the album Sawdust
- Released: 9 October 2007 (U.S.)
- Genre: Electronic rock; gothic rock
- Length: 4:09
- Label: Island; Vertigo
- Songwriters: Bernard Sumner; Peter Hook; Stephen Morris; Ian Curtis
- Producer: The Killers

The Killers singles chronology
"For Reasons Unknown" (2007)	"Shadowplay" (2007)	"Tranquilize" (2007)

Music video
- "Shadowplay" on YouTube

American rock band the Killers recorded a version of "Shadowplay" for the 2007 film Control, based on the life of Joy Division's lead singer Ian Curtis. This version plays during the film's credits and was included on the soundtrack album. The song became a live staple for the band during the Sam's Town Tour.

The band's recording of "Shadowplay" was also included on the group's B-sides and rarities album, Sawdust. Rolling Stone magazine said the recording "should have stayed in the vaults". In April 2013, the Killers were joined onstage by Joy Division and New Order guitarist Bernard Sumner for the first time to perform this song live at Festival Estéreo Picnic in Bogotá, Colombia. They did so once again in 2013 at Lollapalooza.

The Killers version of "Shadowplay" was released as a digital download single on 9 October 2007 and peaked at #68 on the Billboard Hot 100. A music video, directed by Spencer Kaplan and Jonathan V. Sela, was released on 21 November 2007, featuring the band interspersed with clips from Control.

=== Charts ===
Chart (2007)	Peak position
U.S. Billboard Hot 100	68
U.S. Billboard Pop 100	43
U.S. Billboard Modern Rock Tracks	19
Canadian Hot 100	49
Canada Rock (Billboard)	27
UK Singles Chart	115

== Certifications ==
Certifications for "Shadowplay"
Region	Certification	Certified units/sales
Brazil (Pro-Música Brasil)	Gold	30,000^{‡}
^{‡} Sales+streaming figures based on certification alone.
