= Read My Mind (The Killers song) =

2007 single by the Killers

Single by the Killers

from the album Sam's Town
- Released: February 13, 2007
- Genre: Heartland rock; pop
- Length: 4:06
- Label: Island; Vertigo
- Songwriters: Brandon Flowers; Dave Keuning; Mark Stoermer
- Producers: Flood; Alan Moulder; the Killers

The Killers singles chronology
"A Great Big Sled" (2006)	"Read My Mind" (2007)	"For Reasons Unknown" (2007)

Music video
- "Read My Mind" on YouTube

Alternative cover
- 12-inch remixes

"Read My Mind" is a song by American rock band the Killers. It was released on February 13, 2007, as the third single from their second studio album, Sam's Town (2006). It peaked at number 62 on the US Billboard Hot 100, topped three other Billboard rankings, and charted at number 15 on the UK Singles Chart.

In 2009, the song was voted at number 57 in UK radio station XFM's "100 Greatest Songs of All Time". In the same year, it was voted at number 71 on Absolute Radio's "100 Best Songs of the Decade".

== Background and production ==
In an interview with Chicago radio station Q101, lead vocalist Brandon Flowers called "Read My Mind" the best song he had ever written. Neil Tennant and Chris Lowe (of Pet Shop Boys) saw the Killers in concert at Brixton Academy at the end of November 2006, where the idea of a remix for "Read My Mind" was discussed between the two parties. The resulting remix, "Pet Shop Boys 'Stars Are Blazing' Mix" featuring additional vocals by Tennant and Lowe, is one of the B-sides for the single, and is featured on the Pet Shop Boys album Disco Four.

"Read My Mind" was released as part of an iTunes EP on February 13, 2007, featuring an acoustic version and two remixes. It was also released as the third single from Sam's Town in the United Kingdom on February 26, 2007.

There was a promotion CD released in the US that featured 10 dance mixes. This included the full Pet Shop Boys mix, as well as an instrumental version and radio edit. It also featured remixes by Gabriel & Dresden, Steve Bays (from Canadian band Hot Hot Heat) and Linus Loves. The three-track American CD single was released in Best Buy stores. The single is free only with the purchase of Sam's Town.

== Critical reception ==
Critical response to the single was positive; the song was often praised although the album received highly mixed reviews. Yahoo Music said "the album peaks with the arena-sized 'Read My Mind'". Sven Philipp (with Billboard) called the single "a gloriously melodic Duran Duran-meets-Springsteen tale about 'breakin' out of this two-star town.'" Adrien Begrand with PopMatters said, "The Killers shine on the song, Flowers’s synth offsetting Keuning’s tasteful flourishes wonderfully." NME called the song the "righteous and anthemic album highlight." It was also listed as number 12 on Rolling Stone's 100 Best Songs of 2006 even though Sam's Town had previously received negative reviews from the magazine. In reference to the Pet Shop Boys remix, The New York Times called it a "perfect match." This song was also number 84 on MTV Asia's list of Top 100 Hits of 2007. In 2020, Paste ranked the song number one on their list of the 20 greatest Killers songs, and in 2021, American Songwriter ranked the song number five on their list of the 10 greatest Killers songs.

A remix of the song is featured on the original soundtrack of the NBC television series Friday Night Lights. It is nominated for a 2008 People's Choice Award in the category of Favorite Song from a Soundtrack.

This song was also going to be performed as a showcase performance for Chloe Warren, but due to technical complications the performance was cancelled. "Read My Mind" was also used for the promotional video for season 14 of the television show ER on Warner Channel Latin America.

== Music video ==
The video for "Read My Mind" was shot in Tokyo and directed by Diane Martel, shortly before the band embarked on their New Zealand and Australian leg of the Sam's Town Tour. In an interview, Brandon Flowers called the tune "kind of our favorite song" and promised the clip would find the band "in Tokyo, on bikes."

The video shows the band members having fun in different parts of Tokyo. It shows them playing with Japanese school children in Shinjuku Park, interacting with a Japanese Elvis impersonator in the Kabukicho entertainment district, releasing balloons in front of the Nihonbashi Jogakkan Girls High School, and riding on different kinds of bicycles past the Ichogaoka Hachiman Shrine in Asakusabashi. The video ends with the four members of the band checking into a capsule hotel followed by Japanese television character Gachapin.

The video premiered on February 8, 2007, on MTV's Total Request Live as part of their "Spankin' New Music Week." On the March 23, 2007, episode of VH1's Top 20 Countdown, "Read My Mind" was number one, making it the first time a Killers' video had reached that rank.

== Awards and nominations ==
Year	Ceremony	Award	Result
2008	International Dance Music Awards	Best Alternative/Rock Dance Track	Nominated
2008	People's Choice Awards	Favorite Song from a Soundtrack	Nominated

== Track listings ==
7-inch: Vertigo / 6 02517 24568 6 – UK

1. "Read My Mind" – 4:03
2. "Read My Mind" (Steve Bays Remix) – 3:30

CD: Vertigo / 6 02517 24567 9 – UK

1. "Read My Mind" – 4:03
2. "Read My Mind" (Pet Shop Boys Stars Are Blazing Mix) (Edit) – 4:02

CD: Island / ISLR 16704-2 – U.S.

1. "Read My Mind" (Pet Shop Boys Stars Are Blazing Mix) – 7:19
2. "Read My Mind" (Steve Bays Remix) – 3:30
3. "Read My Mind" (Like Rebel Diamonds Mix) – 4:11
- Available in the U.S. at Best Buy stores. Free with purchase of any Killers CD.

CD: Island / 6 02517 24567 9 – Germany

1. "Read My Mind" (Album Version) – 4:03
2. "Read My Mind" (Pet Shop Boys Radio Edit) – 4:02
3. "Read My Mind" (Pet Shop Boys Instrumental) – 7:21
4. "Read My Mind" (Video)

== Charts ==
=== Weekly charts ===
Chart (2007)	Peak position
Australia (ARIA)	32
Austria (Ö3 Austria Top 40)	56
Belgium (Ultratip Bubbling Under Flanders)	12
Canada Hot 100 (Billboard)	39
Canada Rock (Billboard)	5
CIS Airplay (TopHit) Pet Shop Boys remix	139
Czech Republic Airplay (ČNS IFPI)	41
Germany (GfK)	60
Ireland (IRMA)	18
Italy (FIMI)	32
Netherlands (Single Top 100)	95
New Zealand (Recorded Music NZ)	20
Russia Airplay (TopHit) Pet Shop Boys remix	135
Scottish Singles Sales (Official Charts)	16
Slovakia Airplay (ČNS IFPI)	63
Switzerland Airplay (Schweizer Hitparade)	77
UK Singles (Official Charts)	15
Ukraine Airplay (TopHit)	174
US Billboard Hot 100	62
US Adult Alternative Airplay (Billboard)	1
US Adult Pop Airplay (Billboard)	25
US Alternative Airplay (Billboard)	8
US Dance Club Songs (Billboard)	1
US Dance Airplay (Billboard)	1
US Pop 100 (Billboard)	62

=== Year-end charts ===
Chart (2007)	Position
US Dance Club Play (Billboard)	12
US Modern Rock Tracks (Billboard)	28

== Certifications ==
Region	Certification	Certified units/sales
Australia (ARIA)	Platinum	70,000^{‡}
Canada (Music Canada)	Platinum	80,000^{‡}
New Zealand (RMNZ)	Gold	15,000^{‡}
United Kingdom (BPI)	Platinum	600,000^{‡}
United States (RIAA)	Platinum	1,000,000^{‡}
^{‡} Sales+streaming figures based on certification alone.

== Release history ==
Region	Date	Format	Label	Ref.
United States	January 22, 2007	Modern rock radio	Island	
United States	February 13, 2007	Contemporary hit radio	Island	
United States	February 13, 2007	Digital download	Island	
United Kingdom	February 26, 2007	CD	Vertigo	
Australia	April 23, 2007	CD	Island	

== See also ==
- List of number-one dance singles of 2007 (U.S.)
