= Sam's Town =

2006 studio album by the Killers

Studio album by the Killers
- Released: September 27, 2006
- Recorded: February–June 2006
- Studios: Studio at the Palms (Las Vegas); Criterion (London)
- Genres: Alternative rock; indie rock; post-punk revival; new wave; heartland rock
- Length: 44:14
- Label: Island
- Producers: Flood; Alan Moulder; the Killers

The Killers chronology
Hot Fuss (2004)	Sam's Town (2006)	Sawdust (2007)

Singles from Sam's Town
- 1. "When You Were Young" Released: September 18, 2006; 2. "Bones" Released: November 27, 2006; 3. "Read My Mind" Released: February 13, 2007; 4. "For Reasons Unknown" Released: June 25, 2007

Singles from Sam's Town (10th Anniversary Edition)
- 1. "Peace of Mind" Released: October 7, 2016

Sam's Town is the second studio album by American rock band the Killers. It was released on September 27, 2006, by Island Records. Regarding the album, frontman Brandon Flowers noted that he "wanted to create an album that captured, chronologically, everything important that got me to where I am today". Sam's Town has sold almost five million copies worldwide.

== Background ==
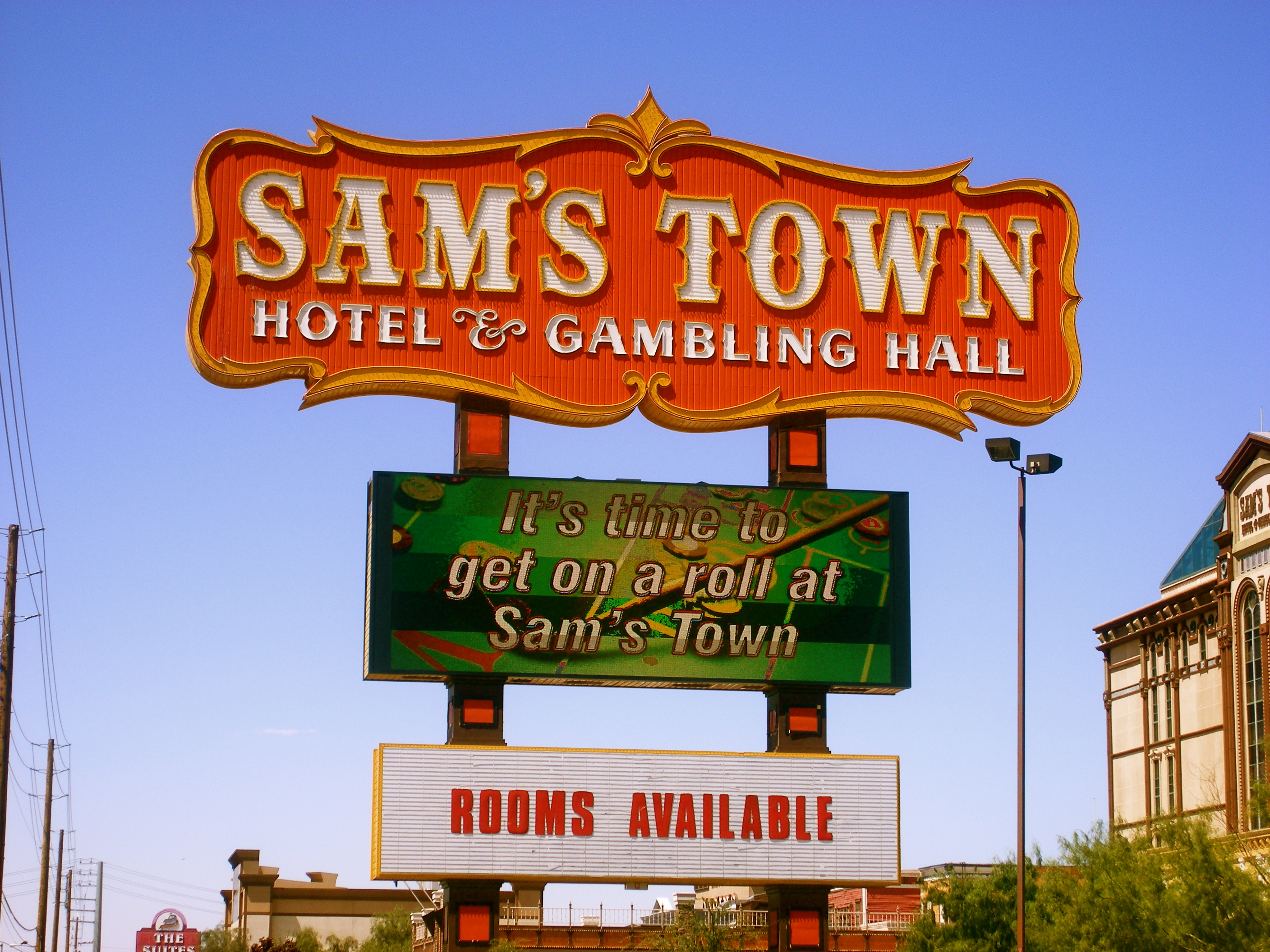
Sam's Town sign for the so-named Las Vegas casino

The album takes its name from Sam's Town Hotel and Gambling Hall, a hotel and casino in Las Vegas, the band's hometown. Sam's Town was also a huge sign that was visible to band member Mark Stoermer through his room window when he was young.

== Artwork ==
According to photographer Anton Corbijn, the band initially wanted a "chic, gypsy look" for the album, and that "out of those discussions [for the sleeve] came these elements of faded glory." The album's co-producer, Flood, is dressed as a Native American in the CD booklet. The artwork inside the album booklet is taken from a Downtown Las Vegas mural painted by Suzanne Hackett-Morgan, a local painter. The cover artwork of Sam's Town features model and singer Felice LaZae. It also features a Desert bighorn sheep, the state mammal and popular symbol of Nevada, where the Killers are from.

== Production ==
The album is said to be influenced by the works of U2, Duran Duran, Bruce Springsteen, the Beatles, Tom Petty and the Heartbreakers, Electric Light Orchestra, and Dire Straits, among others. In the October 2006 issue of Giant magazine, Flowers was quoted as saying that Sam's Town would be "one of the best albums in the past twenty years", and in Entertainment Weekly he remarked that it would be "the album that keeps rock & roll afloat."

Flowers later said of production techniques used on the record, "We didn't use too many vocal effects. On the first album, we used auto-tune, and I didn't even realize what was going on with these machines and the computer. I was adamant about not using it this time. You really hear what my voice sounds like, for the first time." At one point, Flowers was told that Brian Eno had passed over the chance to produce the album, a rejection that affected Flowers greatly. However, when working with Eno for Wonderful Wonderful, Eno told him that he was never offered the project in the first place.

== Tour ==
In support of the album, the Killers embarked on the Sam's Town Tour throughout 2006 and 2007. The tour started in Las Vegas on August 23, 2006 and ended in Melbourne on November 14, 2007. The tour, which was also in support of the band's 2007 compilation album Sawdust, saw the band perform in countries such as Brazil and Argentina for the first time and was described as "a blessing live" by Variety magazine.

== Critical reception ==
Professional ratings
Aggregate scores
Source	Rating
Metacritic	64/100
Review scores
Source	Rating
AllMusic	4/5 stars
The A.V. Club	B−
Blender	4/5 stars
Entertainment Weekly	C
The Guardian	4/5 stars
NME	8/10
Pitchfork	5.9/10
Q	4/5 stars
Rolling Stone	2/5 stars
Spin	3/5 stars

Initially, Sam's Town received generally positive reviews from music critics. At Metacritic, which assigns a normalized rating out of 100 to reviews from mainstream publications, the album received an average score of 64, based on 32 reviews.

Dan Martin of The Observer awarded the album five out of five stars and noted the album's sonic similarity to Born to Run by Bruce Springsteen, writing: "Improbably, this proves to be their masterstroke. Selling Springsteen back to his homeland might look like a canny way of ensuring radio play, but there's no disputing the quality of their songs. Indeed, as Hot Fuss sporadically intimated, the Killers are among pop's foremost practitioners." Comparing Sam's Town to the band's debut album Hot Fuss, Martin stated: "Crucially, Sam's Town sounds like a complete collection, with a far better strike rate than its predecessor."

In a review for NME, Krissi Murison highlighted both the similarities to Hot Fuss and the evolution of the band's sound from the debut to Sam's Town, concluding: "All this, however, isn't to say that The Killers have gone all (God forbid) serious on us. The tunes may be huger, the influences cleverer, the lyrics more adventurous and the band more self-assured, but their primary concern is still being the biggest indie-pop stars on the planet. For all their smart new ways, The Killers are still as flashy, unintentionally funny, and flagrantly affected as ever – and this time we wouldn't even pretend to have it any other way."

Conversely, Sia Michel of The New York Times called the album "painful" and ends the review with the statement that "The Killers are a talented band that evolved too fast, for the wrong reasons." Similarly, Rob Sheffield of Rolling Stone noted a significant departure from Hot Fuss, writing that on Sam's Town, the band "ditch[es] their cheerfully fake Bowie moves and try to get heavy by copying Bruce Springsteen. Yes, that means glockenspiel solos. Yes, it means anthems about the road and looking for America and girls named Mary. No, it's not a good move."

In later years, the album gained a cult following and has been critically lauded as a classic and one of the best rock albums of the 2000s. Despite its two-star rating by Rolling Stone, Sam's Town was voted by the magazine's readers in December 2009 as the most underrated album of the decade. Q magazine ranked it as the 11th best album of the 21st century. In a retrospective for Uproxx, Steven Hyden broaches the issue of pannings by notable media outlets such as Rolling Stone, arguing that these pannings have ultimately cemented the album's status as a classic: "Ten years removed from its original moment, Sam's Town has aged as all misunderstood sorta-classics do, where its deficiencies are now strengths. [...] A record that was risible to some because its attendant hype was so overbearing now has the appeal of a mistreated underdog. Against all odds, the narrative came around on Sam's Town." Writing for MTV News, James Montgomery would theorize that the initial backlash to the album caused the band to change direction with their follow up album, Day & Age, calling the latter "the most un-Sam's Town album imaginable."

=== Accolades ===
Awards and nominations for Sam's Town
Ceremony	Year	Award	Result
Brit Awards	2007	Best International Album	Won
MTV Australia Awards	2007	Album of the Year	Nominated
Shockwaves NME Awards	2007	Best Album	Nominated

Sam's Town on critics' lists and readers' polls
Publication	Country	Accolade	Year	Rank
Q	United Kingdom	Q Artists and Albums of the 21st Century	2010	11
Rolling Stone	United States	Most Underrated Album of the Decade: Readers' Poll	2010	1

"They really changed as writers from Hot Fuss to this. It was about America: the idea that there is an idealism to being young in America but it can all so easily fade away. It's about the guy in the small town – the backbone of America. Brandon Flowers caught a classic American vision, which is amazing because all his references were European or British. He's a great writer. He's got a very old head on young shoulders." – Jon Bon Jovi

== Commercial performance ==
Sam's Town debuted at number two on the US Billboard 200, selling 315,000 copies in its first week. As of July 2008, the album had sold 1.3 million copies in the United States. It became the band's second number-one album on the UK Albums Chart, selling 268,946 copies in its first week. It had sold 1.57 million copies in the United Kingdom by July 2017. The album has been certified Platinum or multi-Platinum in the US, UK, Australia, Canada, and Ireland. Sam's Town also produced multiple charting singles including the platinum chart-topping single "When You Were Young". As of August 2016, Sam's Town had sold almost five million copies worldwide.

== In popular culture ==
Six months after the death of American YouTuber Technoblade, his father revealed on the r/technoblade subreddit that, in his son's instructions for the video that would announce his death, he included a link to a joint YouTube video of the songs "Enterlude" and "Exitlude". Technoblade's father was unsure of how his son wanted the song to be inserted into the video and did not include it due to problems it could cause with copyright.

Popular Twitch streamer xQc has regularly used "Exitlude" as outro music for his streams.

== Legacy ==
On October 7, 2016, Sam's Town was reissued as a remastered double vinyl by Bong Load Records, celebrating the 10th anniversary of the album. The reissue is limited to 5,016 copies and includes two bonus tracks—the previously unreleased demo "Peace of Mind" and a Pet Shop Boys remix of "Read My Mind".

On October 2, 2026, Sam's Town received two reissues—in smoky red and double vinyl audiophile variants—alongside a 7-inch box set celebrating the 20th anniversary of the album. The audiophile variant was limited to 4,000 copies and contained bonus track "Peace of Mind". The 7-inch box set contains the four original singles from the Sam's Town era: "When You Were Young", "Bones", "Read My Mind", and "For Reasons Unknown", alongside their respective B-sides, as well as the "Peace of Mind" single featuring a "Like Rebel Diamonds" remix of "Read My Mind".

== Track listing ==
All tracks are produced by Flood, Alan Moulder and the Killers.

No.	Title	Writer(s)	Length
1.	"Sam's Town"	Brandon Flowers	4:05
2.	"Enterlude"	Flowers	0:49
3.	"When You Were Young"	Flowers; Dave Keuning; Mark Stoermer; Ronnie Vannucci Jr.	3:39
4.	"Bling (Confession of a King)"	Flowers; Stoermer	4:08
5.	"For Reasons Unknown"	Flowers	3:32
6.	"Read My Mind"	Flowers; Keuning; Stoermer	4:06
7.	"Uncle Jonny"	Flowers; Keuning; Stoermer	4:25
8.	"Bones"	Flowers; Stoermer; Vannucci	3:46
9.	"My List"	Flowers	4:08
10.	"This River Is Wild"	Flowers; Stoermer	4:38
11.	"Why Do I Keep Counting?"	Flowers	4:23
12.	"Exitlude"	Flowers	2:24

Bonus track on UK, Australian and European special editions
No.	Title	Writer(s)	Length
13.	"Where the White Boys Dance" (B-side to "When You Were Young" single)	Flowers	3:26

Bonus tracks on Japanese edition
No.	Title	Writer(s)	Length
13.	"Where the White Boys Dance" (B-side to "When You Were Young" single)	Flowers	3:26
14.	"All the Pretty Faces" (B-side to "When You Were Young" single)	Flowers; Keuning; Stoermer	4:45

Bonus track on French edition
No.	Title	Writer(s)	Length
13.	"When You Were Young" (Jacques Lu Cont's Thin White Duke) (Radio Edit, from the "When You Were Young" single)	Flowers; Keuning; Mark Stoermer; Vannucci	3:58

US Best Buy bonus CD
No.	Title	Writer(s)	Length
1.	"All the Pretty Faces" (B-side to "When You Were Young" single)	Flowers; Keuning; Stoermer	4:45
2.	"Daddy's Eyes" (B-side to "Bones" single)	Flowers	4:13

Bonus tracks on 10th anniversary LP edition
No.	Title	Length
13.	"Peace of Mind" (previously unreleased)	4:43
14.	"Read My Mind" (Pet Shop Boys Stars Are Blazing Mix) (from the "Read My Mind" single)	7:20

Bonus DVD
No.	Title	Length
17.	"When You Were Young" (video) (Jump Version)
18.	"When You Were Young" (video) (No Jump Version)
19.	"Making of 'When You Were Young'"

== Personnel ==
Credits adapted from the liner notes of Sam's Town.

=== The Killers ===
- Brandon Flowers
- Dave Keuning
- Mark Stoermer
- Ronnie Vannucci Jr.

=== Additional musicians ===
- Corlene Byrd – backing vocals on "Why Do I Keep Counting?"
- Louis XIV – backing vocals on "Sam's Town" and "My List"
- Tommy Marth – saxophones
- Neeraj Khajanchi – trombone
- Adrina Hanson – strings
- Maryam Haddad – strings
- Tristan Moyer – strings

=== Technical ===
- Flood – production, recording, mixing
- Alan Moulder – production, recording, mixing
- The Killers – production
- Mark Gray – additional engineering
- Neeraj Khajanchi – additional engineering
- Max Dingel – additional engineering
- Andy Savours – mix engineering
- Howie Weinberg – mastering

=== Artwork ===
- Andy West – art direction, design
- Anton Corbijn – photography
- Kristen Yiengst – photo, art coordination
- Doug Joswick – package production

=== Studios ===
- Studio at the Palms (Las Vegas, Nevada) – recording
- Criterion Studios (London) – additional recording
- Assault & Battery (London) – mixing
- Masterdisk (New York City) – mastering

== Charts ==
=== Weekly charts ===
Weekly chart performance for Sam's Town
Chart (2006)	Peak position
Australian Albums (ARIA)	2
Austrian Albums (Ö3 Austria)	5
Belgian Albums (Ultratop Flanders)	13
Belgian Albums (Ultratop Wallonia)	19
Canadian Albums (Billboard)	1
Danish Albums (Hitlisten)	17
Dutch Albums (Album Top 100)	14
European Albums (Billboard)	2
Finnish Albums (Suomen virallinen lista)	20
French Albums (SNEP)	30
German Albums (Offizielle Top 100)	6
Greek Albums (IFPI)	14
Irish Albums (IRMA)	1
Italian Albums (FIMI)	30
Japanese Albums (Oricon)	24
Mexican Albums (Top 100 Mexico)	9
New Zealand Albums (RMNZ)	1
Norwegian Albums (VG-lista)	10
Polish Albums (ZPAV)	34
Portuguese Albums (AFP)	27
Scottish Albums (Official Charts)	1
Spanish Albums (Promusicae)	37
Swedish Albums (Sverigetopplistan)	13
Swiss Albums (Schweizer Hitparade)	9
UK Albums (Official Charts)	1
US Billboard 200	2
US Top Rock Albums (Billboard)	2

=== Year-end charts ===
2006 year-end chart performance for Sams's Town
Chart (2006)	Position
Australian Albums (ARIA)	30
European Albums (Billboard)	53
Greek Foreign Albums (IFPI)	45
Irish Albums (IRMA)	7
Mexican Albums (Top 100 Mexico)	84
New Zealand Albums (RMNZ)	18
UK Albums (OCC)	12
US Billboard 200	95
US Top Rock Albums (Billboard)	17
Worldwide Albums (IFPI)	19

2007 year-end chart performance for Sams's Town
Chart (2007)	Position
Australian Albums (ARIA)	55
European Albums (Billboard)	52
New Zealand Albums (RMNZ)	45
UK Albums (OCC)	24
US Billboard 200	80
US Top Rock Albums (Billboard)	16

2008 year-end chart performance for Sam's Town
Chart (2008)	Position
UK Albums (OCC)	108

2009 year-end chart performance for Sam's Town
Chart (2009)	Position
UK Albums (OCC)	174

=== Decade-end charts ===
Decade-end chart performance for Sam's Town
Chart (2000–2009)	Position
UK Albums (OCC)	70

== Certifications and sales ==
Certifications and sales for Sam's Town
Region	Certification	Certified units/sales
Argentina (CAPIF)	Gold	20,000^{^}
Australia (ARIA)	3× Platinum	210,000^{‡}
Belgium (BRMA)	Gold	25,000^{*}
Canada (Music Canada)	3× Platinum	300,000^{‡}
Denmark (IFPI Danmark)	Gold	20,000^{^}
Germany (BVMI)	Gold	100,000^{^}
Ireland (IRMA)	4× Platinum	60,000^{^}
New Zealand (RMNZ)	2× Platinum	30,000^{^}
Russia (NFPF)	Gold	10,000^{*}
United Kingdom (BPI)	5× Platinum	1,570,000
United States (RIAA)	Platinum	1,300,000
Summaries
Europe (IFPI)	Platinum	1,000,000^{*}
Worldwide	—	5,000,000
^{*} Sales figures based on certification alone.^{^} Shipments figures based on certification alone.^{‡} Sales+streaming figures based on certification alone.

== Release history ==
Release dates and formats for Sam's Town
Region	Date	Format	Label	Catalog
Japan	September 27, 2006	CD	Universal	UICL-9037
Australia	September 30, 2006	CD	Universal	1706722
United Kingdom	October 2, 2006	CD	Lizard King	
United States	October 3, 2006	Picture disc LP	Island	B0007221-01
United States	October 3, 2006	CD	Island	B0007221-02
