= When You Were Young =

2006 single by the Killers

Single by the Killers

from the album Sam's Town
- B-side: "Where the White Boys Dance"; "All the Pretty Faces"
- Released: September 18, 2006
- Studio: Studio at the Palms (Las Vegas); Criterion (London)
- Genre: Alternative rock; post-punk revival; new wave; heartland rock
- Length: 3:40
- Label: Island; Vertigo
- Songwriters: Brandon Flowers; Dave Keuning; Mark Stoermer; Ronnie Vannucci Jr.
- Producers: Flood; Alan Moulder; The Killers

The Killers singles chronology
"Smile Like You Mean It" (2005)	"When You Were Young" (2006)	"Bones" (2006)

Music video
- "When You Were Young" on YouTube

"When You Were Young" is a song by American rock band the Killers. It was released on September 18, 2006, as the lead single from their second studio album, Sam's Town (2006). The song was written and produced by The Killers and co-produced by Flood and Alan Moulder.

The song has proven to be one of the Killers' most successful singles, peaking at number 14 on the Billboard Hot 100, as well as their first number one on the U.S. Modern Rock Tracks chart. Only "Mr. Brightside" and "Somebody Told Me" would stay longer on the chart and have more pop airplay. It is also their highest-charting single to date in the United Kingdom and Australia, peaking at number two and number 10 respectively.

== Background ==
The song, which is in the key of B major and written in common time, displays the band's move towards a more "heartland rock" style, as it is part of an album that was supposedly heavily influenced by the music of Bruce Springsteen. The song itself was reportedly influenced by Springsteen's "Born to Run" and "Thunder Road". The song was nominated for the Grammy Award for Best Rock Song, and the single's video, directed by Anthony Mandler, received a nomination in the category of Best Short Form Music Video. The single was ranked number 69 on iTunes Top 100 Best Sellers: Songs of 2006. The song also made number 4 on the Triple J Hottest 100, 2006.

== Music video ==
The music video for this song was filmed in Tlayacapan, Mexico. The visual style was inspired by the films Japón and Batalla en el Cielo directed by Carlos Reygadas.

Anthony Mandler was the video director and portrayed a very specific storyline, intercut with scenes of the band playing in situ. Flowers commented; “My version of what the song is about is different than what Anthony is portraying in the video”.

In a frame story, it tells the story of a young woman around the age of 20. The video opens with her arriving at a large, white, wooden cross in a rocky hill. She mourns in front of it until a man, who had been desperately searching for her, shows up and comforts her. The following scenes are mostly flashbacks that would illustrate the story of how they came to be there.

The first of these flashbacks is one in which the same woman is praying at a church; after leaving, she encounters the man outside. They kiss and it is evident that there is a romantic relationship between them. One day she arrives home to their shared house to find the man in bed with another woman; seeing them together, she leaves the house, heavily distraught. As the woman runs through the town with tears in her eyes, the video flashes back to their joyous wedding, making it clear that they are husband and wife and that they were thoroughly happy together. The next scene is another flashback in which the man gazes on as she pours water on her legs, demonstrating the attraction he had for her.

Later, the video cuts to a very early scene in the story, set within a bar that the man appears to own. The woman enters and introduces herself for the first time to her future husband, who at the time was chatting to his future mistress. It appears as though she had applied for employment at the bar, because he promptly gives her an apron and leads her away into another room, much to the annoyance of the other woman. In this room the Killers are playing to a small crowd within the bar and in the drums says "Los Dientes Del Perro" as the band name, that in Spanish means "The Dog's Teeth". She shares a prolonged look with Brandon Flowers as he sings the last verse, before turning away to attend to the man's instructions. The final shot of the music video comes back to the first scene set next to wooden cross, with the woman still on the ground and her husband there with her.

The video stars Mexican actors Gustavo Sánchez Parra and Sonia Couoh.

There is also an alternate version of the video in which the woman jumps off a cliff instead of reconciling with the husband.

== Awards ==
Awards and nominations for "When You Were Young"
Year	Ceremony	Award	Result
2007	Grammy Awards	Best Rock Song	Nominated
2007	Grammy Awards	Best Short Form Music Video	Nominated
2007	MuchMusic Video Awards	People's Choice: Favorite International Group	Nominated
2007	MuchMusic Video Awards	Best International Video – Group	Nominated
2007	Shockwaves NME Awards	Best Track	Nominated
2007	Q Awards	Best Video	Won

== Track listings ==
CD: Island / ISLR16591-2 United States

1. "When You Were Young" (radio version) – 3:39
- US promo

7-inch: Vertigo / 170 672-1 United Kingdom

1. "When You Were Young" – 3:39
2. "Where the White Boys Dance" – 3:26

CD: Vertigo / 170 765-8 United Kingdom

1. "When You Were Young" – 3:39
2. "All the Pretty Faces" – 4:44

CD: Island / 0 602517 07658 7 Germany

1. "When You Were Young" – 3:39
2. "All the Pretty Faces" – 4:44
3. "When You Were Young" (video)

CD: Island / ISLR 16633-2 United States

1. "When You Were Young" (Jacques Lu Cont's Thin White Duke Radio Edit) – 3:58
2. "When You Were Young" (The Lindbergh Palace Radio Edit) – 4:31
3. "When You Were Young" (Jacques Lu Cont's Thin White Duke Mix) – 6:23
4. "When You Were Young" (The Lindbergh Palace Remix) – 6:59
5. "When You Were Young" (Jacques Lu Cont's Thin White Duke Dub) – 6:23
6. "When You Were Young" (The Lindbergh Palace Dub) – 6:50
- US promo

2x12-inch: Island / B0007884-11 United States

1. "When You Were Young" (Jacques Lu Cont's Thin White Duke Mix) – 6:23
2. "When You Were Young" (The Lindbergh Palace Remix) – 6:59
3. "When You Were Young" (Jacques Lu Cont's Thin White Duke Dub) – 6:23
4. "When You Were Young" (The Lindbergh Palace Dub) – 6:50

== Personnel ==
Personnel taken from the Song Exploder TV show, and Sam's Town liner notes.

The Killers

- Brandon Flowers – vocals, keyboards, synthesized vocals
- Dave Keuning – guitar
- Mark Stoermer – bass guitar, synthesized vocals
- Ronnie Vannucci Jr. – drums

Additional musicians

- Adrina Hanson – strings
- Maryam Haddad – strings
- Tristan Moyer – strings

Production

- Flood – production, recording, mixing
- Alan Moulder – production, recording, mixing
- The Killers – production
- Howie Weinberg – mastering

== Charts ==
=== Weekly charts ===
2006–2007 weekly chart performance for "When You Were Young"
Chart (2006–2007)	Peak position
Australia (ARIA)	10
Belgium (Ultratop 50 Flanders)	43
Belgium (Ultratip Bubbling Under Wallonia)	11
Canada (Canadian Singles Chart)	5
Canada Rock Top 30 (Radio & Records)	1
Europe (European Hot 100 Singles)	9
Germany (GfK)	44
Ireland (IRMA)	6
Italy (FIMI)	40
Netherlands (Dutch Top 40 Tipparade)	11
Netherlands (Single Top 100)	71
New Zealand (Recorded Music NZ)	10
Norway (VG-lista)	20
Scottish Singles Sales (Official Charts)	2
Sweden (Sverigetopplistan)	45
Switzerland (Schweizer Hitparade)	56
UK Singles (Official Charts)	2
Ukraine Airplay (TopHit)	153
US Billboard Hot 100	14
US Adult Alternative Airplay (Billboard)	16
US Adult Pop Airplay (Billboard)	15
US Alternative Airplay (Billboard)	1
US Dance Club Songs (Billboard)	5
US Dance Singles Sales (Billboard)	22
US Dance Airplay (Billboard)	4
US Mainstream Rock (Billboard)	30
US Pop Airplay (Billboard)	31
US Pop 100 (Billboard)	18

2013 weekly chart performance for "When You Were Young"
Chart (2013)	Peak position
Ukraine Airplay (TopHit)	54

=== Year-end charts ===
Year-end chart performance for "When You Were Young"
Chart (2006)	Position
UK Singles (OCC)	47
US Modern Rock Tracks (Billboard)	14

== Certifications ==
Certifications and sales for "When You Were Young"
Region	Certification	Certified units/sales
Australia (ARIA)	6× Platinum	420,000^{‡}
Brazil (Pro-Música Brasil) DMS	Diamond	250,000^{*}
Brazil (Pro-Música Brasil)	Diamond	250,000^{‡}
Canada (Music Canada)	4× Platinum	320,000^{‡}
Denmark (IFPI Danmark)	Gold	4,000^{^}
New Zealand (RMNZ)	2× Platinum	60,000^{‡}
Spain (Promusicae)	Gold	30,000^{‡}
United Kingdom (BPI)	3× Platinum	1,800,000^{‡}
United States (RIAA)	5× Platinum	5,000,000^{‡}
^{*} Sales figures based on certification alone.^{^} Shipments figures based on certification alone.^{‡} Sales+streaming figures based on certification alone.

== Release history ==
Release dates and formats for "When You Were Young"
Region	Date	Format	Label	Ref.
United States	July 24, 2006	Modern rock radio	Island	
United States	August 28, 2006	Contemporary hit radio	Island	
United Kingdom	September 18, 2006	CD	Vertigo	
Australia	September 25, 2006	CD	Island	

== Covers ==
- Coldplay's Chris Martin covered the song at an unplanned appearance for MENCAP.
- Amy Macdonald covered the song in her native Scotland and at Lowlands Fest in 2008.
- Biffy Clyro covered the song on live radio on "Today FM".
- The Infamous Stringdusters covered the song live for The A.V. Club.
- Simon Webbe, a former member of British boy band Blue, covered the song on BBC's Radio 1 in the Live Lounge and on tour.
- Taking Back Sunday covered the song at London's Taste of Chaos on November 18, 2006.
- Astrid Swan covered the song on KCMP in April 2007.
- The Noisettes covered the song on March 25, 2009, on BBC's Radio 1 in the Live Lounge. This cover was included in Radio 1's Live Lounge – Volume 4, the fourth album in a series of Live Lounge albums, released in October of the same year.
- Synthpop artist Joy Electric covered the song on his thirteen studio album, Favorites at Play.
- Trio of Oz included "When You Were Young" on their 2010 self-titled studio album.
- Garrison Starr recorded an acoustic version of the song for her 2012 free extended play, Not For Nothing.
- SYMT has covered the song at Stage Monks Studios.
- Vinyl Theatre covered the song live on tour in 2015.
- Against the Current covered the song on their YouTube channel in 2016.
- Patrick Kell covered the song on his 2017 album titled See the Light.
- Modern Baseball covered the song during their farewell residency at Philadelphia's Union Transfer in October 2017.
- Indie pop band Echosmith covered the song as part of their setlist during their 2018 Inside A Dream tour.
- Midtown covered the song during their 2022 Resurrection tour.

== In popular culture ==
- The song appears in the video games, Guitar Hero III: Legends of Rock, SingStar Amped, Rock Band and Guitar Hero Live.
- The single's B-side, "All the Pretty Faces" appears in Guitar Hero 5.
- The song was featured in the third section of the 2006 Victoria's Secret Fashion Show.
- In 2009 it was voted at number 37 in the UK radio station XFM's "100 Greatest Songs of All Time". Archived from the original on September 10, 2009.
- The song appears in the film Regretting You.
