= For Reasons Unknown =

Single by The Killers

from the album Sam's Town
- B-side: "Romeo and Juliet" (Live at Abbey Road Studios); "Sam's Town" (Live at Abbey Road Studios)
- Released: June 25, 2007
- Recorded: 2006
- Genre: Heartland rock
- Length: 3:31
- Label: Island; Mercury
- Songwriter: Brandon Flowers
- Producers: Flood; Alan Moulder; The Killers

The Killers singles chronology
"Read My Mind" (2007)	"For Reasons Unknown" (2007)	"Shadowplay" (2007)

Music video
- "For Reasons Unknown" on YouTube

"For Reasons Unknown" is a song by American rock band The Killers and was written by lead vocalist Brandon Flowers. It is the fifth track on their second studio album Sam's Town, released in October 2006. The song was released as the fourth single from the album in the United Kingdom on June 25, 2007, and also the fourth and final North American single.

It is the only studio recording of a song by the band where Flowers plays bass guitar, with bassist Mark Stoermer playing guitar on the track.

== Background ==
The B-sides are a cover of Dire Straits' "Romeo and Juliet" and an acoustic version of "Sam's Town" both recorded live at Abbey Road Studios for the Channel 4 show Live from Abbey Road, and later featured on their compilation album Sawdust. "For Reasons Unknown" also appeared on their 2013 compilation album Direct Hits. Similarly to Sam's Town, the cover art features a Desert bighorn sheep, the state mammal of Nevada, where the Killers are from.

== Reception ==
=== Critical ===
The song received positive reviews from music critics. Billboard said of the track, "this synth-free rocker opens with ominous multitrack vocals and grinding fuzz guitars and builds to a huge pop chorus as Flowers dances on the edge of a relentlessly pumped groove."

== Music video ==
The video was premiered in the UK on May 18, 2007 and was shown on the International Music Feed and MTV Two as well as various other UK music channels. The video was shot in black-and-white, and has already premiered on MuchMusic in Canada. The video premiered on Australian music channels on August 3, 2007.

== Chart performance ==
It became one of their lowest charting singles in the UK to date, peaking at #53 on July 1, 2007, spending only one week in the UK Top 75. This song was #78 on MTV Asia's list of the Top 100 Hits of 2007. Frontman Brandon Flowers has stated that they did not "promote" the single like previous ones, stating four singles for the album was too much, and said he wished they hadn't released "Bones" as a single.

== Track listing ==
UK CD:

1. "For Reasons Unknown" – 3:31
2. "Romeo and Juliet" (Live at Abbey Road Studios) – 5:25

UK 7":

1. "For Reasons Unknown" – 3:31
2. "Sam's Town" (Live at Abbey Road Studios) – 3:45

== Charts ==
Chart (2007)	Peak position
UK Singles Chart	53
Venezuela Pop Rock (Record Report)	1

== Certifications ==
Region	Certification	Certified units/sales
United Kingdom (BPI)	Silver	200,000^{‡}
^{‡} Sales+streaming figures based on certification alone.
