= 20 Years of Hot Fuss =

2024-25 concert residency by the Killers

- Tour by The Killers
- Poster announcing the 20 Years of Hot Fuss residency
- Location: North America; Oceania
- Venue: The Colosseum at Caesars Palace; Qudos Bank Arena; Rod Laver Arena
- Associated album: Hot Fuss
- Start date: August 14, 2024
- End date: January 25, 2025
- No. of shows: 15

The Killers concert chronology
- Rebel Diamonds Tour (2024); 20 Years of Hot Fuss (2024-25)

20 Years of Hot Fuss was the first concert residency by American rock band the Killers, held at The Colosseum at Caesars Palace on the Las Vegas Strip in Paradise, Nevada, as well as at the Qudos Bank Arena and Rod Laver Arena in Australia, in support of their debut studio album, Hot Fuss (2004). The residency commenced on August 14, 2024, and concluded on January 25, 2025, with a total of 15 shows. The residency marked the first time the entirety of Hot Fuss had been played live since 2005.

== Background ==
=== Announcement ===
20 Years of Hot Fuss was announced on January 23, 2024, with originally a series of 8 shows at the Colosseum at Caesars Palace from August 14 to August 30. Tickets proceeded to go on sale on January 27. Two extra shows, set for August 31 and September 1, had tickets quietly released on August 15 due to high demand.

While embarking on their Rebel Diamonds tour in Australia in support of their greatest-hits album Rebel Diamonds, the Killers announced two special 20 Years of Hot Fuss shows in Sydney and Melbourne.

On November 19, 2024, the Killers announced they would be performing 3 "encore" shows in January at the Colosseum at Caesars Palace. Tickets went on sale the same day. The last two shows were filmed to be "preserved for posterity," although, as of November 2025, a video of the concerts has yet to be released.

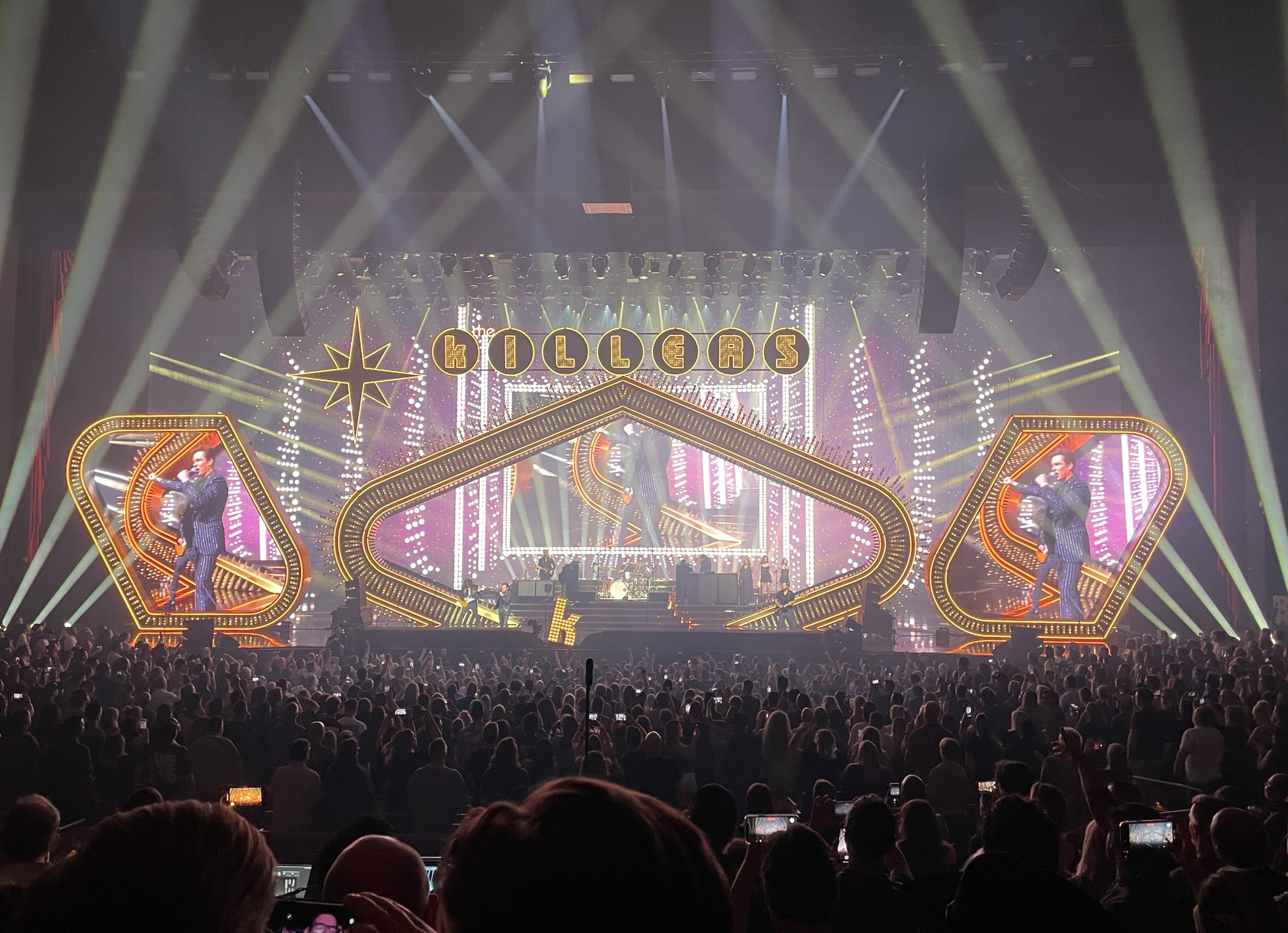
The Killers performing 20 Years of Hot Fuss on September 1, 2024.

=== Highlights ===
The band released the single "Bright Lights" to coincide with the residency. "Bright Lights" was released on August 9, 2024, and had a music video by Micah Bickham released on the same day, featuring the original lineup singing on the residency stage at the Colosseum at Caesars Palace.

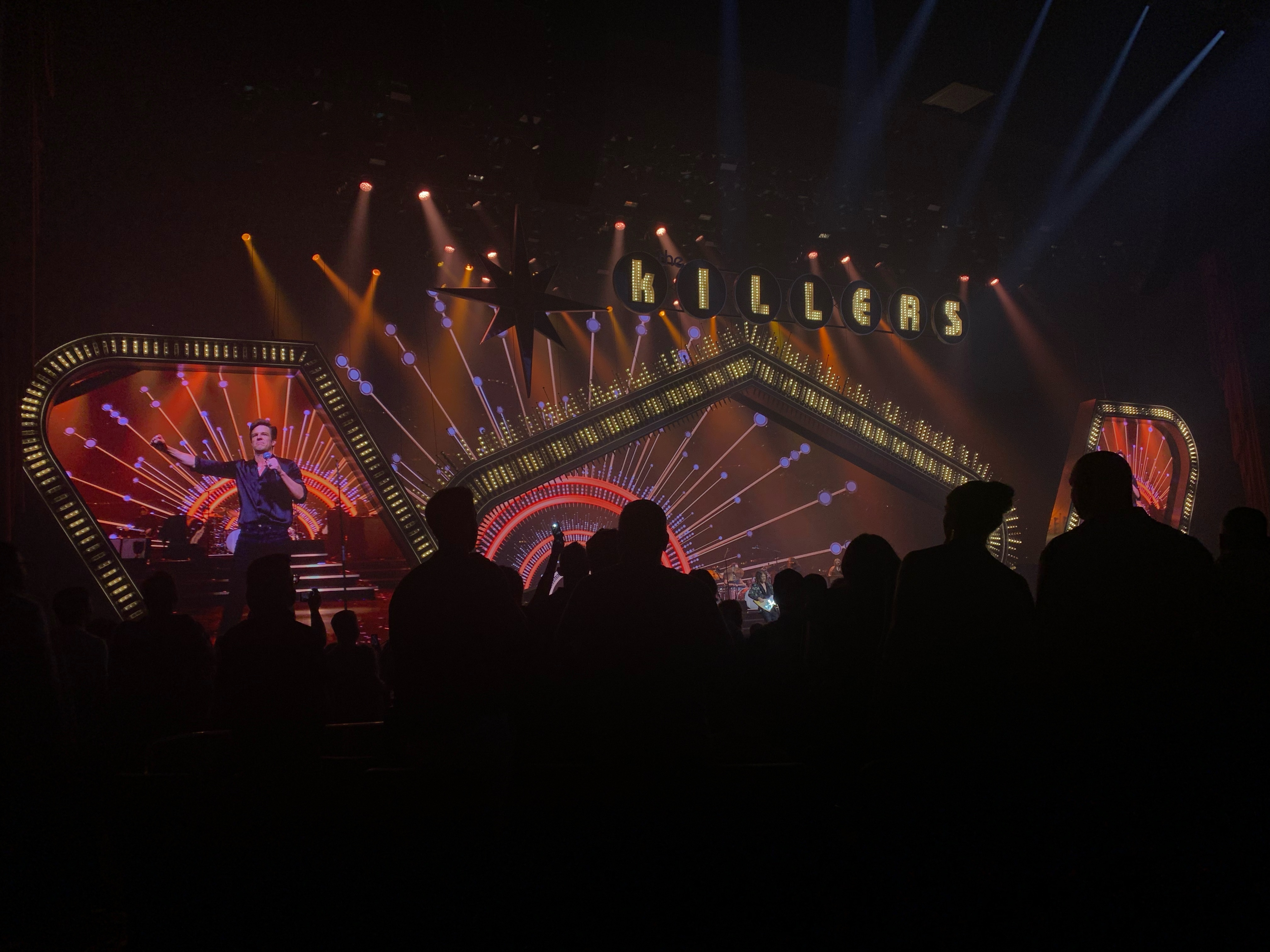
The Killers performing 20 Years of Hot Fuss on August 23, 2024.

The residency saw the band play multiple songs from Hot Fuss that hadn't been played live since as far back as 2005. "Everything Will Be Alright", the final track on Hot Fuss, hadn't been played live since 2005, "Believe Me Natalie" since 2018, and "Change Your Mind" since 2019. The residency saw other songs from the Killers' discography being played live for the first time in years. "Uncle Jonny" from Sam's Town was played live for the first time since 2016, and "Sweet Talk" from Sawdust was played for the first time since 2017.

== Reception ==
The residency received positive reviews from critics. Emma Schoors of Atwood Magazine remarked how "the rockers provided a glitzy, glamorous ode to Sin City's history, and a rocket straight into its future." Samantha Hall of Clash Music magazine called the show "a pilgrimage for fans whose lives have been soundtracked by The Killers’ music for two decades." Rolling Stone described the performance as "a nostalgic evening that began with a complete performance of Hot Fuss."

== Set list ==
This set list is representative of the show on August 30, 2024. It is not intended to represent all shows from the residency.

Act I: Hot Fuss (2004) album start to finish:

1. "Jenny Was a Friend of Mine"
2. "Mr. Brightside"
3. "Smile Like You Mean It"
4. "Somebody Told Me"
5. "All These Things That I've Done" (with a snippet of Elvis Presley's "Burning Love")
6. "Andy, You're a Star"
7. "On Top"
8. "Change Your Mind"
9. "Believe Me Natalie"
10. "Midnight Show" (with "Luck Be a Lady" cover intro)
11. "Everything Will Be Alright"
12. "Under the Gun"
13. "Glamorous Indie Rock & Roll"

Act II:

1. "Sam's Town"
2. "Enterlude"
3. "Read My Mind"
4. "Caution"
5. "Runaways"
6. "Uncle Jonny"
7. "Human"
8. "Bright Lights"
9. "When You Were Young"

== Residency dates ==
List of concerts, showing date, city, country, and venue
Date	City	Country	Venue
North America I - Original dates
August 14, 2024	Las Vegas	United States	The Colosseum at Caesars Palace
August 16, 2024	Las Vegas	United States	The Colosseum at Caesars Palace
August 17, 2024	Las Vegas	United States	The Colosseum at Caesars Palace
August 21, 2024	Las Vegas	United States	The Colosseum at Caesars Palace
August 23, 2024	Las Vegas	United States	The Colosseum at Caesars Palace
August 24, 2024	Las Vegas	United States	The Colosseum at Caesars Palace
August 28, 2024	Las Vegas	United States	The Colosseum at Caesars Palace
August 30, 2024	Las Vegas	United States	The Colosseum at Caesars Palace
August 31, 2024	Las Vegas	United States	The Colosseum at Caesars Palace
September 1, 2024	Las Vegas	United States	The Colosseum at Caesars Palace
Oceania - Australian shows
December 7, 2024	Sydney	Australia	Qudos Bank Arena
December 13, 2024	Melbourne	Australia	Rod Laver Arena
North America II - Encore shows
January 22, 2025	Las Vegas	United States	The Colosseum at Caesars Palace
January 24, 2025	Las Vegas	United States	The Colosseum at Caesars Palace
January 25, 2025	Las Vegas	United States	The Colosseum at Caesars Palace

== Personnel ==
Credits adapted from NME.

The Killers

- Brandon Flowers – lead vocals, keyboards, piano
- Dave Keuning – guitar, backing vocals
- Mark Stoermer – bass, backing vocals
- Ronnie Vannucci Jr. - drums, percussion

Touring musicians

- Ted Sablay - guitar, keyboards, backing vocals
- Jake Blanton - keyboards, guitar, backing vocals
- Erica Canales - backing vocals
- Miranda Joan - backing vocals
- Nicky Egan - backing vocals, acoustic guitar
