= Hot Fuss Tour =

2003–05 concert tour by the Killers

- Tour by The Killers
- A poster announcing shows during the Europe X leg of the tour
- Location: Europe; North America; Australia; Asia
- Associated album: Hot Fuss
- Start date: November 19, 2003
- End date: October 13, 2005
- No. of shows: 181 in North America; 114 in Europe; 5 in Asia; 5 in Oceania; 305 in total

The Killers concert chronology
- Hot Fuss Tour (2003–05); Sam's Town Tour (2006–07)

The Hot Fuss Tour was the first headlining concert tour by American rock band the Killers. It took place between 2003 and 2005 in support of the band's debut studio album, Hot Fuss, which was released in June 2004. The tour began at Rescue Rooms in Nottingham, England on November 19, 2003, and ended at the Pacific Coliseum in Vancouver, British Columbia, Canada on October 13, 2005. Throughout the Hot Fuss tour, the band played well over 300 shows in a two-year period.

== History ==
In late 2003, shortly after being signed by UK independent record label Lizard King and a successful string of performances in London, the Killers announced that they would be touring the UK supporting British Sea Power. During the first half of 2004, they continued playing support slots, opening for Stellastarr on both their UK and US tours and Morrissey on two dates in the US. They also made appearances at South by Southwest & Coachella Festival. As part of their meteoric rise, the band toured small, cutting-edge indie rock clubs including Jacksonville's Thee Imperial, where The Killers manager Braden Merrick and venue owner Lisa Thomas booked the show. The opening act was the then-unknown Black Kids performing at the time under a different name.

The band began their first ever headline tour in Portsmouth, England on May 23, 2004. Initially the band were headlining small venues which held no more than 1,000 people, but by the end of the tour, they were regularly selling out venues with capacities of over 5,000. The band supported by Kaiser Chiefs, Bloc Party & The Futureheads, headlined the NME Awards Tour in early 2005, and also supported U2 on three stadium dates of their Vertigo Tour. The Killers were joined by British Sea Power for the final leg in North America. Bringing the tour full circle, the final show took place in Vancouver, British Columbia, Canada on October 13, 2005. They played 305 shows spanning four continents and eighteen countries.

Support acts during the tour included Louis XIV, Surferosa, The Departure, Ambulance LTD, Blood Arm, The Zutons & Tegan & Sara.

=== Stage setup ===
Frontman and keyboardist Brandon Flowers emblazoned his keyboard stand with rhinestones after learning that David Bowie was coming to one of the band's shows at Irving Plaza in New York City. This started a tradition of Flowers' keyboard stands being decorated differently for each tour.

=== Festivals ===
The Killers played a number of well received festival sets in the summer of 2004. Among these was a performance in the New Bands Tent at Glastonbury Festival. The following year, the band were offered a chance by Michael Eavis to headline the Sunday night of Glastonbury after original headliner Kylie Minogue was diagnosed with breast cancer. They declined the offer however, stating that they did not feel they had earned the right to headline the festival yet, and instead went on to play in their scheduled sub-headline slot on the Friday night. Despite almost losing guitarist, Dave Keuning while travelling there (after the band 'accidentally' left him at Fleet services), the performance was praised by many.

=== Live 8 ===
On July 2, 2005, the Killers performed on the London stage of the Live 8 concert, performing "All These Things That I've Done". The band (all dressed in white) were joined by a gospel choir. Later that day, Robbie Williams incorporated the song's refrain "I've got soul but I'm not a soldier" into his own performance.

== Personnel ==
- Brandon Flowers – lead vocals, keyboards
- Dave Keuning – guitar, background vocals
- Mark Stoermer – bass, background vocals
- Ronnie Vannucci Jr. – drums, percussion, background vocals, keyboards (on "Everything Will Be Alright")

== Set list ==
These set lists are representative of the show on the respective dates. It is not intended to represent all shows from the tour.

=== Sample setlists ===
November 22, 2003 – Cardiff, Wales

1. "Jenny Was a Friend of Mine"
2. "On Top"
3. "Somebody Told Me"
4. "Smile Like You Mean It"
5. "Mr. Brightside"
6. "Under the Gun"
7. "Midnight Show"
April 5, 2004 – Montreal, Quebec, Canada

1. "Jenny Was a Friend of Mine"
2. "On Top"
3. "Mr. Brightside"
4. "Smile Like You Mean It"
5. "Somebody Told Me"
6. "Andy, You're a Star"
7. "Glamorous Indie Rock & Roll"
8. "Midnight Show"
9. "All These Things That I've Done"
October 4, 2004 – New York, United States

1. "Jenny Was a Friend of Mine"
2. "On Top"
3. "Mr. Brightside"
4. "Smile Like You Mean It"
5. "Change Your Mind"
6. "Andy, You're a Star"
7. "Glamorous Indie Rock & Roll"
8. "Somebody Told Me"
9. "Under the Gun"
10. "All These Things That I've Done"
February 19, 2005 – London, England

1. "Mr. Brightside"
2. "Smile Like You Mean It"
3. "Change Your Mind"
4. "Where is She (Soft Surrender)"^{[1]}
5. "Jenny Was a Friend of Mine"
6. "Andy, You're a Star"
7. "Under the Gun"
8. "Somebody Told Me"
9. "Glamorous Indie Rock & Roll"
10. "Midnight Show"
11. "On Top/Time"^{[2]}
12. "All These Things That I've Done"
June 24, 2005 – Glastonbury Festival, England

1. "Somebody Told Me"
2. "Jenny Was a Friend of Mine"
3. "On Top"
4. "Under the Gun"
5. "Smile Like You Mean It"
6. "Andy, You're a Star"
7. "Midnight Show"
8. "All the Pretty Faces"^{[3]}
9. "Glamorous Indie Rock & Roll"
10. "Mr. Brightside"
11. "All These Things That I've Done"
October 13, 2005 – Vancouver, British Columbia, Canada

1. "Jenny Was a Friend of Mine"
2. "On Top"
3. "Somebody Told Me"
4. "Midnight Show"
5. "Believe Me Natalie"
6. "Change Your Mind"
7. "Under the Gun"
8. "Smile Like You Mean It"
9. "Andy, You're a Star"
10. "Glamorous Indie Rock & Roll"
11. "Mr. Brightside"
12. "Everything Will Be Alright"
13. "Moonage Daydream" (David Bowie cover)
14. "All These Things That I've Done"

=== Notes ===
- 1 "Where is She (Soft Surrender)" was a new song performed by the band, as of 2025, a studio version has yet to be released.
- 2 "On Top" with Pink Floyd's "Time" segued on to the end of it.
- 3 "All The Pretty Faces" was a new song performed by the band, going on to be released as a B-side to "When You Were Young" and also appearing on 2007's compilation album Sawdust and Guitar Hero 5.

== Tour dates ==
Date	City	Country	Venue	Other Info
Europe I
November 19, 2003	Nottingham	England	Rescue Rooms	Opened for British Sea Power
November 20, 2003	Leeds	England	Joseph’s Well	Opened for British Sea Power
November 21, 2003	Lincoln	England	Bivouac	Opened for British Sea Power
November 22, 2003	Cardiff	Wales	Clwb Ifor Bach	Opened for British Sea Power
November 23, 2003	Leicester	England	Princess Charlotte	Opened for British Sea Power
November 24, 2003	High Wycombe	England	The White Room	Opened for British Sea Power
November 25, 2003	Northampton	England	Soundhaus	Opened for British Sea Power
November 26, 2003	Reading	England	Fez	Opened for British Sea Power
November 27, 2003	Colchester	England	Arts Centre	Opened for British Sea Power
November 28, 2003	Birmingham	England	Birmingham Academy 2	Opened for British Sea Power
November 30, 2003	Coventry	England	University of Warwick	Opened for British Sea Power
December 1, 2003	London	England	The Garage	Opened for British Sea Power
December 3, 2003	London	England	Barfly @ The Monarch	Opened for British Sea Power
North America I
January 29, 2004	New York City	United States	Bowery Ballroom	Opened for The Stills
Europe II
February 11, 2004	London	England	Notting Hill Arts Club	Headlined
February 13, 2004	London	England	Hammersmith Palais	Opened for Jet
February 14, 2004	London	England	Institute of Contemporary Arts	Headlined
North America II
February 25, 2004	Las Vegas	United States	Ice House Lounge	Headlined
Europe III
February 27, 2004	Leeds	England	The Cockpit	Opened for Stellastarr
February 28, 2004	Sheffield	England	The Leadmill	Opened for Stellastarr
February 29, 2004	Leicester	England	Princess Charlotte	Opened for Stellastarr
March 1, 2004	Glasgow	Scotland	King Tut's Wah Wah Hut	Opened for Stellastarr
March 2, 2004	Birmingham	England	Birmingham Academy 2	Opened for Stellastarr
March 3, 2004	Manchester	England	Hop & Grape	Opened for Stellastarr
March 4, 2004	London	England	Electric Ballroom	Opened for Stellastarr
March 5, 2004	London	England	Shepherd's Bush Empire	Opened for Gary Numan
March 6, 2004	Bristol	England	Fleece & Firkin	Opened for Stellastarr
March 7, 2004	Portsmouth	England	The Wedgewood Rooms	Opened for Stellastarr
March 9, 2004	Cambridge	England	Polytechnic University	Opened for Stellastarr
March 10, 2004	Nottingham	England	Rescue Rooms	Opened for Stellastarr
March 11, 2004	Sheffield	England	Fez Club	Opened for Stellastarr
March 12, 2004	Cardiff	Wales	Barfly	Opened for Stellastarr
March 13, 2004	Bath	England	Moles Club	Opened for Stellastarr
March 14, 2004	Brighton	England	Freebutt	Opened for Stellastarr
North America III
March 18, 2004	Austin	United States	South by Southwest @ The Caucus	Festival
March 19, 2004	Austin	United States	Stubbs BBQ	Opened for Stellastarr
March 20, 2004	Dallas	United States	Tree's	Opened for Stellastarr
March 21, 2004	Houston	United States	Rhythm Room	Opened for Stellastarr
March 22, 2004	New Orleans	United States	The Parish	Opened for Stellastarr
March 24, 2004	Jacksonville	United States	Lisa's Thee Imperial	Opened for Stellastarr
March 25, 2004	Atlanta	United States	Cotton Club	Opened for Stellastarr
March 26, 2004	Richmond	United States	Alley Katz	Opened for Stellastarr
March 27, 2004	Baltimore	United States	Fletcher's	Opened for Stellastarr
March 29, 2004	Washington, D.C.	United States	Black Cat	Opened for Stellastarr
March 30, 2004	Philadelphia	United States	The Khyber	Opened for Stellastarr
March 31, 2004	New York City	United States	Irving Plaza	Opened for Stellastarr
April 1, 2004	Portland	United States	Space	Opened for Stellastarr
April 2, 2004	Cambridge	United States	Middle East Cafe	Opened for Stellastarr
April 3, 2004	Burlington	United States	Club Metronome	Opened for Stellastarr
April 5, 2004	Montreal	Canada	Cabaret Music Hall	Opened for Stellastarr
April 6, 2004	Toronto	Canada	Mod Club Theatre	Opened for Stellastarr
April 7, 2004	Cleveland Heights	United States	Grog Shop	Opened for Stellastarr
April 9, 2004	Newport	United States	Southgate House	Opened for Stellastarr
April 10, 2004	Columbus	United States	Promowest Pavilion	Opened for Stellastarr
April 11, 2004	Detroit	United States	The Shelter	Opened for Stellastarr
April 13, 2004	Chicago	United States	Double Door	Opened for Stellastarr
April 14, 2004	Iowa City	United States	Gabe's	Opened for Stellastarr
April 15, 2004	Minneapolis	United States	7th Street Entry	Opened for Stellastarr
April 16, 2004	Madison	United States	The Annex	Opened for Stellastarr
April 17, 2004	St. Louis	United States	Gargoyle Club	Opened for Stellastarr
April 18, 2004	Lawrence	United States	Replay Lounge	Opened for Stellastarr
April 19, 2004	Austin	United States	Saengerrunde Hall	Opened for Stellastarr
April 20, 2004	Denver	United States	Larimer Lounge	Opened for Stellastarr
April 21, 2004	Salt Lake City	United States	Liquid Joe's	Opened for Stellastarr
April 22, 2004	Los Angeles	United States	Wiltern Theater	Opened for Morrissey
April 23, 2004	Portland	United States	Berbati's Plan	Opened for Stellastarr
April 24, 2004	Seattle	United States	Crocodile Cafe	Opened for Stellastarr
April 25, 2004	Vancouver	Canada	Richard on Richard	Opened for Stellastarr
April 27, 2004	Los Angeles	United States	Wiltern Theater	Opened for Morrissey
April 28, 2004	San Francisco	United States	Great American Music Hall	Opened for Stellastarr
April 29, 2004	San Diego	United States	The Casbah	Opened for Stellastarr
April 30, 2004	Phoenix	United States	Mason Jar	Opened for Stellastarr
May 2, 2004	Indio	United States	Gobi Tent @ Coachella Festival	Festival
Europe IV
May 4, 2004	Amsterdam	Netherlands	Melkweg Oude Zaal	Headlined
May 23, 2004	Portsmouth	England	Wedgewood Rooms	Headlined
May 25, 2004	Bristol	England	Fleece & Firkin	Headlined
May 26, 2004	Liverpool	England	Liverpool Academy	Headlined
May 27, 2004	Leeds	England	The Cockpit	Headlined
May 28, 2004	Manchester	England	Manchester University	Headlined
May 29, 2004	Birmingham	England	Birmingham Academy	Headlined
May 30, 2004	York	England	Fibbers	Headlined
June 2, 2004	Nottingham	England	Rescue Rooms	Headlined
June 3, 2004	London	England	Mean Fiddler	Headlined
June 6, 2004	Oxford	England	Zodiac	Headlined
June 7, 2004	London	England	HMV Shop Oxford Street	Headlined
June 8, 2004	Brighton	England	The Zap	Headlined
June 9, 2004	Reading	England	Fez Club	Headlined
North America IV
June 10, 2004	San Diego	United States	Soma San Diego	Opened for Stellastarr
June 11, 2004	Mountain View	United States	Live 105 BFD @ Shoreline Amphitheater	Festival
June 12, 2004	Irvine	United States	KROQ Weenie Roast @ Verizon Wireless Amphitheater	Festival
June 17, 2004	San Francisco	United States	Popscene	Headlined
June 18, 2004	Portland	United States	Dante's	Headlined
June 19, 2004	Seattle	United States	Nuemo's	Headlined
June 20, 2004	Boise	United States	The Big Easy	Headlined
June 21, 2004	Sparks	United States	New Oasis	Headlined
June 23, 2004	New York City	United States	Mercury Lounge	Headlined
June 24, 2004	New York City	United States	Rothko	Headlined
Europe V
June 26, 2004	Pilton	England	New Bands Tent @ Glastonbury Festival	Festival
June 27, 2004	Glasgow	Scotland	King Tut's Wah Wah Hut	Headlined
June 29, 2004	Brussels	Belgium	Le Botanique	Headlined
June 30, 2004	Amsterdam	Netherlands	Paradiso	Headlined
July 1, 2004	Hamburg	Germany	Molotow Club	Headlined
July 2, 2004	Berlin	Germany	Roter Salon	Headlined
July 3, 2004	Cologne	Germany	Underground	Headlined
July 4, 2004	Rotterdam	Netherlands	Metropolis Festival	Festival
July 6, 2004	Colchester	England	Colchester Arts Centre	Headlined
July 7, 2004	Northampton	England	Soundhaus	Headlined
July 8, 2004	London	England	London Astoria	Headlined
July 9, 2004	Sheffield	England	Leadmill	Headlined
July 10, 2004	Naas	Republic of Ireland	New Band Stage & Oxegen	Festival
July 11, 2004	Balado	Scotland	NME Stage @ T in the Park	Festival
North America V
July 15, 2004	Salt Lake City	United States	Lo-Fi Cafe	Headlined
July 16, 2004	Toronto	Canada	Mod Club	Headlined
July 17, 2004	Chicago	United States	House of Blues	Opened for Morrissey
July 19, 2004	Kansas City	United States	Hurricane	Headlined
July 20, 2004	Oklahoma City	United States	Bricktown Live	Headlined
July 22, 2004	Dallas	United States	Tree's	Headlined
July 23, 2004	Houston	United States	Engine Room	Headlined
July 24, 2004	Austin	United States	Stubbs BBQ	Headlined
July 25, 2004	El Paso	United States	T Lounge	Headlined
July 26, 2004	Tucson	United States	City Limits	Headlined
Asia I
July 30, 2004	Naeba Ski Resort	Japan	Red Marquee @ Fuji Rock Festival	Festival
North America VI
August 16, 2004	New York City	United States	Bowery Ballroom	Headlined
August 17, 2004	Providence	United States	The Call	Headlined
Europe VI
August 19, 2004	Kiewit	Belgium	Pukkelpop	Festival
August 21, 2004	Chelmsford	England	NME Stage @ V Festival	Festival
August 22, 2004	Weston Park	England	NME Stage @ V Festival	Festival
August 23, 2004	London	England	Kentish Town Forum	Headlined
North America VII
August 26, 2004	Scottsdale	United States	Venue of Scottsdale	Headlined
August 27, 2004	San Diego	United States	San Diego Street Fair	Festival
August 28, 2004 (early)	Los Angeles	United States	The Troubadour	Headlined
August 28, 2004 (late)	Los Angeles	United States	The Troubadour	Headlined
August 29, 2004	Santa Ana	United States	Galaxy Concert Theater	Headlined
August 31, 2004	San Francisco	United States	Great American Music Hall	Headlined
September 1, 2004	Orangevale	United States	The Boardwalk	Headlined
September 3, 2004	Vancouver	Canada	Commodore Ballroom	Headlined
September 4, 2004	Victoria	Canada	Centennial Square	Opened for Sam Roberts
September 6, 2004	Seattle	United States	Bumbershoot	Festival
September 8, 2004	Winnipeg	Canada	West End Cultural Centre	Headlined
September 9, 2004	Minneapolis	United States	The Quest	Headlined
September 10, 2004	Milwaukee	United States	The Rave	Headlined
September 11, 2004	Chicago	United States	Metro Chicago	Headlined
September 12, 2004	Atlanta	United States	The Masquerade	Headlined
September 13, 2004	St. Louis	United States	Mississippi Nights	Headlined
September 14, 2004	Boston	United States	The Roxy	Headlined
September 17, 2004	Austin	United States	Austin City Limits Music Festival @ Zilker Park	Festival
September 18, 2004	San Bernardino	United States	Main Stage @ KROQ Inland Invasion	Festival
September 19, 2004	Las Vegas	United States	House of Blues	Headlined
September 24, 2004	Fort Lauderdale	United States	Culture Room	Headlined
September 25, 2004	Tampa	United States	Masquerade	Headlined
September 26, 2004	Orlando	United States	House of Blues Orlando	Headlined
September 27, 2004	Jacksonville	United States	Jack Rabbits	Headlined
September 28, 2004	Athens	United States	40 Watt Club	Headlined
Europe VII
September 29, 2004	Madrid	Spain	Sala Copérnico	Headlined
North America VIII
September 30, 2004	Carrboro	United States	Cat's Cradle	Headlined
October 1, 2004	Norfolk	United States	Norva Theater	Headlined
October 2, 2004	Philadelphia	United States	The TLA	Headlined
October 3, 2004	Washington, D.C.	United States	9:30 Club	Headlined
October 4, 2004	New York City	United States	Irving Plaza	Headlined
October 5, 2004	New York City	United States	Irving Plaza	Headlined
October 7, 2004	Boston	United States	The Roxy	Headlined
October 8, 2004	Montreal	Canada	Club Soda	Headlined
October 9, 2004	Ottawa	Canada	Capital Music Hall	Headlined
October 11, 2004	Toronto	Canada	The Opera House	Headlined
October 12, 2004	Detroit	United States	Saint Andrew's Hall	Headlined
October 14, 2004	Columbus	United States	Newport Music Hall	Headlined
October 16, 2004	New Orleans	United States	Voodoo Experience @ City Park	Festival
October 17, 2004	Houston	United States	Reliant Center	Headlined
October 19, 2004	Dallas	United States	Gypsy Tea Room	Headlined
October 20, 2004	Memphis	United States	New Daisy Theater	Headlined
October 21, 2004	Lawrence	United States	Granada Theater	Headlined
October 22, 2004	Denver	United States	Bluebird Theater	Headlined
October 23, 2004	Tempe	United States	Tempe Beach Park	Festival
Europe VIII
November 3, 2004	Amsterdam	Netherlands	Melkweg	Headlined
November 4, 2004	Paris	France	Festival les inRocKs @ Zénith de Paris	Festival
November 5, 2004	Cologne	Germany	Gebäude 9	Headlined
November 6, 2004	Berlin	Germany	Columbia Club	Headlined
November 9, 2004	Stockholm	Sweden	Kägelbanan	Headlined
November 11, 2004	Dublin	Ireland	Olympia Theatre	Headlined
November 12, 2004	Manchester	England	Manchester Academy	Headlined
November 13, 2004	London	England	Shepherd's Bush Empire	Headlined
North America IX
November 19, 2004	Athens	United States	40 Watt Club	Headlined
November 20, 2004	Tampa	United States	Masquerade	Headlined
November 21, 2004	Jacksonville	United States	Freebird Live	Headlined
November 22, 2004	Orlando	United States	The Social	Headlined
November 23, 2004	Fort Lauderdale	United States	Culture Room	Headlined
December 1, 2004	Toronto	Canada	Kool Haus	Headlined
December 2, 2004	Cleveland	United States	House of Blues	Headlined
December 3, 2004	Pittsburgh	United States	The Rock Club	Headlined
December 4, 2004	Fairfax	United States	George Mason University	Headlined
December 9, 2004	Seattle	United States	Deck The Hall Ball @ KeyArena	Festival
December 10, 2004	San Francisco	United States	Not So Silent Night @ Bill Graham Civic Auditorium	Festival
December 11, 2004	Los Angeles	United States	KROQ Almost Acoustic Christmas @ Universal Amphitheater	Festival
Oceania
December 14, 2004	Perth	Australia	Metro City	Headlined
December 16, 2004	Adelaide	Australia	Thebarton Theatre	Headlined
December 17, 2004	Melbourne	Australia	The Palace	Headlined
December 18, 2004	Sydney	Australia	Enmore Theatre	Headlined
December 20, 2004	Brisbane	Australia	The Arena	Headlined
North America X
December 30, 2004	Las Vegas	United States	House of Blues	Headlined
December 31, 2004	Los Angeles	United States	Giant Village @ Downtown Los Angeles	Festival
Europe IX
January 19, 2005	Newcastle upon Tyne	England	Northumbria University	NME Awards Tour
January 20, 2005	Glasgow	Scotland	Glasgow Academy	NME Awards Tour
January 21, 2005	Glasgow	Scotland	Glasgow Academy	NME Awards Tour
January 23, 2005	Nottingham	England	Rock City	NME Awards Tour
January 24, 2005	Birmingham	England	Birmingham Academy	NME Awards Tour
January 25, 2005	Liverpool	England	University of Liverpool	NME Awards Tour
January 27, 2005	Leeds	England	University of Leeds	NME Awards Tour
January 28, 2005	Manchester	England	Manchester Academy	NME Awards Tour
January 29, 2005	Manchester	England	Manchester Academy	NME Awards Tour
January 31, 2005	Norwich	England	University of East Anglia	NME Awards Tour
February 1, 2005	Bristol	England	Bristol Academy	NME Awards Tour
February 2, 2005	Brighton	England	Brighton Dome	NME Awards Tour
February 4, 2005	Cambridge	England	Cambridge Corn Exchange	NME Awards Tour
February 5, 2005	Southampton	England	Southampton Guildhall	NME Awards Tour
February 6, 2005	Cardiff	Wales	Cardiff University	NME Awards Tour
February 7, 2005	Paris	France	Élysée Montmartre	Headlined
February 9, 2005	London	England	Brixton Academy	NME Awards Tour
February 19, 2005 (early)	London	England	Brixton Academy	Headlined
February 19, 2005 (late)	London	England	Brixton Academy	Headlined
February 20, 2005	Utrecht	Netherlands	Tivoli	Headlined
February 21, 2005	Strasbourg	France	La Laiterie	Headlined
February 22, 2005	Milan	Italy	Rolling Stone	Headlined
February 24, 2005	Zürich	Switzerland	Abart	Headlined
February 25, 2005	Vienna	Austria	The Arena	Headlined
February 26, 2005	Munich	Germany	Muffathalle	Headlined
February 27, 2005	Cologne	Germany	Prime Club	Headlined
March 1, 2005	Hamburg	Germany	Grünspan Club	Headlined
March 3, 2005	Barcelona	Spain	Apollo	Headlined
Asia II
March 6, 2005	Nagoya	Japan	Club Quattro	Headlined
March 8, 2005	Hiroshima	Japan	Club Quattro	Headlined
March 9, 2005	Osaka	Japan	Shinsaibashi Club Quattro	Headlined
March 10, 2005	Tokyo	Japan	Liquid Room	Headlined
North America XI
April 11, 2005	Tempe	United States	Marquee Theatre	Headlined
April 12, 2005	La Jolla	United States	RIMAC Arena	Headlined
April 13, 2005	Long Beach	United States	The Vault 350	Headlined
April 15, 2005	Las Vegas	United States	The Joint @ Hard Rock	Headlined
April 16, 2005	Los Angeles	United States	The Wiltern	Headlined
April 17, 2005	Los Angeles	United States	The Wiltern	Headlined
April 19, 2005	San Francisco	United States	The Fillmore	Headlined
April 21, 2005	Portland	United States	Arlene Schnitzer Concert Hall	Headlined
April 22, 2005	Vancouver	Canada	Vogue Theatre	Headlined
April 23, 2005	Vancouver	Canada	Vogue Theatre	Headlined
April 24, 2005	Seattle	United States	Moore Theatre	Headlined
April 26, 2005	Edmonton	Canada	Shaw Conference Centre	Headlined
April 27, 2005	Calgary	Canada	Stampede Corral	Headlined
April 28, 2005	Spokane	United States	Big Easy	Headlined
May 2, 2005	Memphis	United States	Beale Street Music Festival @ Tom Lee Park	Headlined
May 2, 2005	Salt Lake City	United States	Kingsbury Hall	Headlined
May 3, 2005	Denver	United States	Paramount Theatre	Headlined
May 5, 2005	Hollywood	United States	Xbox 360 launch @ The Avalon	Headlined
May 7, 2005	Milwaukee	United States	The Rave	Headlined
May 9, 2005	Davenport	United States	The Col Ballroom	Headlined
May 10, 2005	Kansas City	United States	Uptown Theater	Headlined
May 11, 2005	Chicago	United States	Riviera Theatre	Headlined
May 21, 2005	Irvine	United States	KROQ Weenie Roast @ Verizon Wireless Amphitheater	Festival
May 27, 2005	St. Louis	United States	The Pageant	Headlined
May 26, 2005	Covington	United States	Madison Theater	Headlined
May 27, 2005	Columbus	United States	Promowest Pavilion	Headlined
May 28, 2005	Cleveland	United States	The Scene	Headlined
May 30, 2005	Detroit	United States	Fox Theatre	Headlined
May 31, 2005	Toronto	Canada	Molson Canadian Amphitheatre	Headlined
June 1, 2005	Montreal	Canada	Métropolis	Headlined
June 3, 2005	Philadelphia	United States	Electric Factory	Headlined
June 4, 2005	New York City	United States	Central Park SummerStage	Festival
June 6, 2005	Providence	United States	Lupo's @ The Strand	Headlined
June 7, 2005	Boston	United States	Bank of America Pavilion	Festival
June 8, 2005	Columbia	United States	Merriweather Post Pavilion	Festival
June 10, 2005	Myrtle Beach	United States	House of Blues	Headlined
June 11, 2005	Atlanta	United States	Music Midtown	Festival
June 17, 2005	Birmingham	United States	City Stages @ Linn Park	Festival
Europe X
June 24, 2005	Pilton	England	Pyramid Stage @ Glastonbury Festival	Festival (sub-headlined)
June 29, 2005	Cardiff	Wales	Millennium Stadium	opened for U2
July 2, 2005	London	England	Live 8 in Hyde Park	Charity concert
July 3, 2005	Belfort	France	Eurockéennes	Festival
July 5, 2005	Chorzów	Poland	Stadion Śląski	opened for U2
July 6, 2005	Berlin	Germany	MariaAm Ostbahnhof	Headlined
July 7, 2005	Hamburg	Germany	Docks	Headlined
July 9, 2005	Balado	Scotland	Main stage @ T in the Park	Festival
July 10, 2005	Naas	Republic of Ireland	Main stage @ Oxegen	Festival
July 13, 2005	Amsterdam	Netherlands	Amsterdam Arena	opened for U2
July 14, 2005	Cologne	Germany	Prime Club	Headlined
July 15, 2005	Zurich	Switzerland	Abart	Headlined
July 17, 2005	Barcelona	Spain	Apollo	Headlined
North America XII
July 20, 2005	Louisville	United States	Palace Theatre	Headlined
July 21, 2005	St. Louis	United States	The Pageant	Headlined
July 22, 2005	Indianapolis	United States	Murat Shrine	Headlined
July 23, 2005	Mount Pleasant	United States	Soaring Eagle Casino	Headlined
July 24, 2005	Chicago	United States	SBC East Stage @ Lollapalooza	Festival
July 29, 2005	San Diego	United States	Qualcomm Stadium	Festival
August 9, 2005	Saint Paul	United States	Roy Wilkins Auditorium	Headlined
August 10, 2005	Omaha	United States	Sokol Underground	Headlined
August 12, 2005	Morrison	United States	Red Rocks Amphitheatre	Festival
August 13, 2005	Wichita	United States	The Cotillion	Headlined
August 14, 2005	Tulsa	United States	Cain's Ballroom	Headlined
August 15, 2005	Oklahoma City	United States	Bricktown Event Center	Headlined
August 17, 2005	Grand Prairie	United States	Nokia Theatre	Headlined
August 18, 2005	Austin	United States	Stubbs BBQ	Headlined
August 19, 2005	Houston	United States	Verizon Amphitheater	Headlined
August 21, 2005	Tampa	United States	USF Sun Dome	Headlined
Europe XI
August 26, 2005	Reading	England	Main stage @ Reading Festival	Festival (sub-headlined)
August 27, 2005	Leeds	England	Main stage @ Leeds Festival	Festival (sub-headlined)
North America XIII
September 29, 2005	Atlantic City	United States	Borgata Hotel and Casino	Headlined with British Sea Power
September 30, 2005	Wantagh	United States	Jones Beach Theater	Headlined with British Sea Power
October 1, 2005	Staten Island	United States	Across The Narrows	Festival
October 6, 2005	Long Beach	United States	Convention Center	Headlined with British Sea Power
October 7, 2005	Las Vegas	United States	The Joint @ Hard Rock	Headlined with British Sea Power
October 8, 2005	Mountain View	United States	Download Festival @ Shoreline Amphitheatre	Festival (Headlined)
October 12, 2005	Seattle	United States	KeyArena	Headlined with British Sea Power
October 13, 2005	Vancouver	Canada	Pacific Coliseum	Headlined with British Sea Power

=== TV ===
Notable television performances

May 20, 2004	United States	Last Call with Carson Daly	"Performed Somebody Told Me"
June 4, 2004	United Kingdom	Top of the Pops	"Performed Mr. Brightside"
June 4, 2004	United Kingdom	Later...with Jools Holland	"Performed Mr. Brightside & "Somebody Told Me"
June 5, 2004	United Kingdom	CD:UK	"Performed Mr. Brightside"
June 15, 2004	United States	Jimmy Kimmel Live	Performed "Somebody Told Me" & "Midnight Show"
July 16, 2004	Canada	MuchOnDemand	Performed "Somebody Told Me"
August 20, 2004	United Kingdom	TRL UK	Performed "All These Things That I've Done"
October 5, 2004	United States	The Late Show with David Letterman	Performed "Somebody Told Me"
October 29, 2004	United Kingdom	Friday Night with Jonathan Ross	Performed "Somebody Told Me"
December 1, 2004	United States	Late Night with Conan O'Brien	Performed "Mr. Brightside"
November 13, 2004	United Kingdom	CD:UK	Performed "All These Things That I've Done"
January 15, 2005	United States	Saturday Night Live	Performed "Mr. Brightside" & "Somebody Told Me"
January 18, 2005	United States	Total Request Live	Performed "Mr. Brightside", "Smile Like You Mean It" & "Somebody Told Me"
April 14, 2005	United States	The Tonight Show with Jay Leno	Performed "Mr. Brightside"
May 31, 2005	Canada	MuchOnDemand
August 28, 2005	United States	MTV Video Music Awards	Performed "Mr. Brightside" & "All These Things That I've Done"
October 10, 2005	United States	The Tonight Show with Jay Leno	Performed "All These Things That I've Done"
