= Rebel Diamonds Tour =

2024 concert tour by the Killers

- Tour by The Killers
- A poster announcing tour dates from Europe Leg I
- Location: Europe; North America; Japan; Australia
- Associated album: Rebel Diamonds
- Start date: June 12, 2024
- End date: December 14, 2024
- Legs: 4
- No. of shows: 17 in Europe; 11 in North America; 1 in Japan; 4 in Australia; 34 in total
- Supporting act: Travis

The Killers concert chronology
- Imploding the Mirage Tour (2021-23); Rebel Diamonds Tour (2024); 20 Years of Hot Fuss (2024-25)

The Rebel Diamonds Tour was the seventh major concert tour by American rock band the Killers. The tour supports their second greatest hits album Rebel Diamonds (2023), which features select songs from each of their studio albums.

The tour began at the 3Arena in Dublin on June 12, 2024 and encompassed 34 dates across the UK, Ireland, Spain, Japan, United States, Canada, Mexico and Australia. The tour ended on December 14, 2024, at Rod Laver Arena in Melbourne.

== Background ==
The tour was announced in December 2023, ahead of the release of Rebel Diamonds, initially spanning ten concerts in arenas across the UK and Ireland. This was later extended to 16 dates due to demand. The band later added a number of dates in North America, as well as a number of festival performances in Europe, Japan and the United States.

=== Staging ===
The stage for the band's arena shows was diamond-shaped and carpeted to look like a casino. A light-up letter 'K', the band's logo, was positioned at the front of the stage, from which frontman Brandon Flowers frequently performed throughout the show; behind him were lead guitarist Dave Keuning, bassist Jake Blanton and rhythm guitarist Ted Sablay, and at the very back were drummer Ronnie Vannucci (center-stage), keyboardist Robbie Connolly (to Vannucci's right), and the three female backing vocalists (far stage right). A large screen was positioned behind the stage, displaying visuals throughout the band's performances, and there were two large screens on either side of the stage.

=== Highlights ===
During their show at London's O2 Arena on the 10th July, the band stopped their set midway through to show the final minutes of England's Euro 2024 semi-final match against the Netherlands, which England won 2-1, on the big screens. When the final whistle blew, securing England's qualification to the final, red and white confetti was launched over the crowd, and the band immediately began playing "Mr. Brightside", whilst drummer Ronnie Vannucci re-emerged on-stage wearing an England football shirt. After the show, the band tweeted, "Tonight we played for England!", and the moment went viral on social media, as well as being reported widely in the national and international media. Commenting on the moment on the News Agents podcast, journalist Emily Maitlis described "Mr. Brightside" as the "real national anthem" and argued that "that track now will be glued to that moment of football" in the English collective memory.

== Critical reception ==
The UK and Ireland leg of the tour received widespread acclaim from music critics.

Aidan McCartney of the Manchester Evening News gave the band's performance at Co-Op Live a five-star review, praising "the band's ability to deliver unexpected delights after all this time" and stating that they are "still at the peak of their powers twenty years on." Writing for the i newspaper, Craig McLean noted that the band's set was shorter and more intimate than other similar artists touring at the same time in the UK, but nonetheless noted that "the band were in roaring form from the off", with particular praise for Dave Keuning's "exultant moves on his trapezoidal guitar" in a four-star review. Reviewing the same Manchester concert as McCartney, Andrew Steel of The Yorkshire Post was similarly complimentary of the band's downsizing of the "relative... intimacy" of the band's arena performances in comparison to their stadium shows during the Imploding the Mirage Tour in 2022, claiming it allowed the band to appeal more to hardcore, as well as casual, fans. Dave Simpson of The Guardian gave the band's Co-Op Live show four stars, commenting that the band "set the pace with a series of big hitters" and that frontman Brandon Flowers "comes over like a cross between a young Elvis Presley and a fairground compere".

Lisa Wright of the London Evening Standard gave a five-star review of the band's first night in London on 4th July, calling Brandon Flowers "one of this century's great frontmen" and praising the show's production, stating that "everything about the production contained maximum world-building razzmatazz that turned the O2 into a stadium-worthy immersive extravaganza". NME's Thomas Smith gave four stars to the second London show, with similar praise both of Flowers for "assum[ing] the role of gracious host, reminding the audience that he and his band are in the service industry, gleefully here to facilitate the best of times" and the "smart staging – diamond-shaped lighting and a garishly-patterned casino carpet." Reviewing the band's show in Glasgow, David Pollock of The Scotsman gave a four-star review, calling Flowers "one of the modern music industry’s premier salespeople".

== Set list ==
These set lists are representative of the show on respective dates. It is not intended to represent all shows from the tour.

=== First set list ===
The first set list was used on the tour's opening night in Dublin on June 12, 2024, and for subsequent opening nights in Manchester and Glasgow, as well as the band's fourth night in Manchester and second and fifth nights in London. It features "Read My Mind" as the opening song, and closes with "Mr. Brightside". The encore also features a cover of Erasure's "A Little Respect".

1. "Read My Mind"
2. "Somebody Told Me"
3. "Spaceman"
4. "Jenny Was a Friend of Mine"
5. "Smile Like You Mean It"
6. "Shot at the Night"
7. "This River Is Wild"
8. "Running Towards a Place"
9. "On Top"
10. "The Man"
11. "A Dustland Fairytale"
12. "Be Still"
13. "Runaways"
14. "All These Things That I've Done"
15. "When You Were Young"
16. "Caution"
17. "Dying Breed"

Encore

18. "Your Side of Town"
19. "boy"
20. "A Little Respect" (Erasure cover)
21. "Human"
22. "Mr. Brightside"

==== Notes ====
- On 5 July in London, Andy Bell joined the band during the encore to perform Erasure's "A Little Respect", as well as "Human".
- On 10 July in London, the band stopped the show after "A Dustland Fairytale" to show the final three minutes of England's Euro 2024 semi-final match against the Netherlands, which they won 2-1. Consequently, they played "Mr. Brightside" immediately after this moment rather than as the final song in the encore, removing "Be Still" from the set list entirely.

=== Second set list ===
The second set list was used on the band's second night performing in Dublin, Manchester and Glasgow, and their third and sixth nights in London. This set opens with "My Own Soul's Warning", which was used as the opening song during the previous Imploding the Mirage Tour, and closes with "Exitlude", the first time this song has been played regularly since the Sam's Town Tour in 2006-07. An altered version of the set list was used for the band's opening night in London, opening with "Sam's Town".

1. "My Own Soul's Warning"
2. "Enterlude"
3. "Human"
4. "The Way It Was"
5. "Somebody Told Me"
6. "Smile Like You Mean It"
7. "For Reasons Unknown"
8. "Dying Breed"
9. "Bones"
10. "From Here On Out"
11. "Caution" (with "Rut" segue)
12. "Runaways"
13. "Read My Mind"
14. "Your Side of Town" (acoustic version)
15. "Andy, You're a Star"
16. "Spirit"
17. "All These Things That I've Done"

Encore

18. "Pressure Machine"
19. "Mr. Brightside"
20. "When You Were Young"
21. "Exitlude"

==== Notes ====
- On 4 July in London, A heavily amended version of this set list was played to mark Independence Day, opening with "Sam's Town", "Enterlude" and "When You Were Young". "Human" was moved to the encore, played before "Mr. Brightside". "Spirit" was removed from the set list, and "Bones" was replaced by "Bling (Confession of a King)". "Bling (Confession of a King)" replaced "Bones" again on 11 July in London.
- On 7 July in London, "In Another Life" replaced "Pressure Machine" . On 26 June in Glasgow, "Pressure Machine" was cut from the set list entirely.
- On 11 July in London, the band played "boy" and a cover of Erasure's "A Little Respect" before "Caution", and removed "From Here On Out" and "Spirit" from the set list.
- "From Here On Out" was frequently replaced with a cover. On 14 June in Dublin, the band covered the Kinks' "Come Dancing". On 26 June in Glasgow and 7 July in London, the band covered the Waterboys' "The Whole of the Moon". On 4 July in London, the band covered Tom Petty and the Heartbreakers's American Girl to mark Independence Day.

=== Third set list ===
The third set list was played on the band's third night performing in Dublin, Manchester and Glasgow, and their fourth night in London. It opens with "Mr. Brightside" and closes with "All These Things That I've Done".

1. "Mr. Brightside"
2. "Spaceman"
3. "Shot at the Night"
4. "Run for Cover"
5. "Jenny Was a Friend of Mine"
6. "Quiet Town"
7. "Somebody Told Me"
8. "Human"
9. "boy"
10. "Here with Me"
11. "From Here On Out"
12. "A Dustland Fairytale"
13. "Runaways"
14. "Read My Mind"
15. "Smile Like You Mean It"
16. "My Own Soul's Warning"
17. "When You Were Young"

Encore

18. "Lightning Fields"
19. "Caution"
20. "All These Things That I've Done"

==== Notes ====
- On 15 June in Dublin, "Battle Born" was added to the set list as the closing song. This marked the first time that "Battle Born" has been performed live since 2013, when it was the closing track for the Battle Born World Tour. Snippets from Elvis Presley's "Are You Lonesome Tonight?" and U2's "Sweetest Thing" were also played during "A Dustland Fairytale" and "Read My Mind" respectively.
- On 21 June in Manchester, the band performed a cover of New Order's "True Faith" after "boy", and a cover of The Stone Roses' "Ten Storey Love Song" after "A Dustland Fairytale".

== Tour dates ==
List of concerts, showing date, city, country, venue, opening act, attendance, and gross revenue
Date	City	Country	Venue	Opening act(s)	Attendance	Revenue
Leg 1 — Europe
June 12, 2024	Dublin	Ireland	3Arena	Travis	39,473 / 39,473	$3,730,537
June 14, 2024	Dublin	Ireland	3Arena	Travis	39,473 / 39,473	$3,730,537
June 15, 2024	Dublin	Ireland	3Arena	Travis	39,473 / 39,473	$3,730,537
June 18, 2024	Manchester	England	Co-op Live	Travis	68,471 / 68,471	$8,073,240
June 19, 2024	Manchester	England	Co-op Live	Travis	68,471 / 68,471	$8,073,240
June 21, 2024	Manchester	England	Co-op Live	Travis	68,471 / 68,471	$8,073,240
June 22, 2024	Manchester	England	Co-op Live	Travis	68,471 / 68,471	$8,073,240
June 25, 2024	Glasgow	Scotland	OVO Hydro	Travis	39,177 / 39,177	$4,426,475
June 26, 2024	Glasgow	Scotland	OVO Hydro	Travis	39,177 / 39,177	$4,426,475
June 27, 2024	Glasgow	Scotland	OVO Hydro	Travis	39,177 / 39,177	$4,426,475
July 4, 2024	London	England	The O2 Arena	Travis	107,740 / 107,740	$12,904,068
July 5, 2024	London	England	The O2 Arena	Travis	107,740 / 107,740	$12,904,068
July 7, 2024	London	England	The O2 Arena	Travis	107,740 / 107,740	$12,904,068
July 8, 2024	London	England	The O2 Arena	Travis	107,740 / 107,740	$12,904,068
July 10, 2024	London	England	The O2 Arena	Travis	107,740 / 107,740	$12,904,068
July 11, 2024	London	England	The O2 Arena	Travis	107,740 / 107,740	$12,904,068
July 13, 2024 (Note: This show was part of the Mad Cool Festival.)	Madrid	Spain	Iberdrola Music	—N/a	—N/a	—N/a
Leg 2 - Asia
July 26, 2024 (Note: This show was part of the Fuji Rock Festival.)	Yuzawa	Japan	Naeba Ski Resort	—N/a	—N/a	—N/a
Leg 3 - North America
August 3, 2024 (Note: This show was part of the Lollapalooza Festival.)	Chicago	United States	Grant Park	—N/a	—N/a	—N/a
August 9, 2024 (Note: This show was part of the Outside Lands Festival.)	San Francisco	United States	Golden Gate Park	—N/a	—N/a	—N/a
September 7, 2024	Camden	United States	Freedom Mortgage Pavilion	—N/a	—N/a	—N/a
September 8, 2024	Columbia	United States	Merriweather Post Pavilion	—N/a	—N/a	—N/a
September 10, 2024	Toronto	Canada	Budweiser Stage	—N/a	—N/a	—N/a
September 11, 2024	Toronto	Canada	Budweiser Stage	—N/a	—N/a	—N/a
September 14, 2024	New York City	United States	Forest Hills Stadium	—N/a	—N/a	—N/a
September 15, 2024	New York City	United States	Forest Hills Stadium	—N/a	—N/a	—N/a
October 3, 2024	Guadalajara	Mexico	Estadio Tres de Marzo	Franz Ferdinand	—N/a	—N/a
October 5, 2024	Mexico City	Mexico	Estadio GNP Seguros	Franz Ferdinand	—N/a	—N/a
October 9, 2024	Monterrey	Mexico	Estadio Borregos	Franz Ferdinand	—N/a	—N/a
Leg 4 - Australia
November 30, 2024	Australia	Townsville	Queensland Country Bank Stadium	—N/a	—N/a	—N/a
December 6, 2024	Australia	Sydney	Qudos Bank Arena	—N/a	—N/a	—N/a
December 9, 2024	Australia	Brisbane	Brisbane Entertainment Centre	—N/a	—N/a	—N/a
December 12, 2024	Australia	Melbourne	Rod Laver Arena	—N/a	—N/a	—N/a
December 14, 2024	Australia	Melbourne	Rod Laver Arena	—N/a	—N/a	—N/a

== Personnel ==
Credits adapted from Rock and Roll Globe.

=== The Killers ===
- Brandon Flowers – lead vocals, keyboards, piano, bass on "For Reasons Unknown"
- Ronnie Vannucci Jr. – drums, percussion, rhythm guitar on "For Reasons Unknown" (audience member on drums)
- Dave Keuning – lead guitar, backing vocals

=== Additional musicians ===
- Ted Sablay – rhythm and lead guitar, keyboards, backing vocals
- Jake Blanton – bass, backing vocals
- Robbie Connolly – keyboards, rhythm guitar, backing vocals
- Taylor Milne – rhythm guitar, keyboards, backing vocals
- Erica Canales – backing vocals
- Nicky Egan – backing vocals
- Miranda Jones – backing vocals, acoustic guitar
