= On Top (The Killers song) =

Song by the Killers

from the album Hot Fuss
- A-side: "Mr. Brightside"
- Released: June 7, 2004
- Recorded: 2003
- Studio: The Hearse (Berkeley, California)
- Genre: Alternative rock; synthpop; electronica
- Length: 4:18
- Label: Island; Lizard King
- Songwriters: Brandon Flowers; Dave Keuning; Mark Stoermer; Ronnie Vannucci Jr.
- Producers: Jeff Saltzman; the Killers

"On Top" is a song by American rock band the Killers. It is the seventh track of the band’s debut studio album, Hot Fuss (2004). It was written by Brandon Flowers, Dave Keuning, Mark Stoermer, and Ronnie Vannucci Jr., and produced by Jeff Saltzman and the Killers. The song is one of their most popular live, and was released as a B-side to "Mr. Brightside".

== Background and release ==
"On Top" was one of the first songs written by the Killers, dating back to as early as 2002. In an interview with PopMatters, guitarist Dave Keuning commented that, early in the band's career, he thought "On Top" was "pretty good material" remarking that "if it ever saw the light of day, I thought it might do good if still in town. I was a believer." The song, written by all four members of the Killers, Brandon Flowers, Dave Keuning, Mark Stoermer, and Ronnie Vannucci Jr., has been described in terms of genres as synth-pop and electronica.

"On Top" first appeared on a eponymous self-released demo CD in 2002, given out at gigs that the band played around Las Vegas, and later reappearing on an early iteration of Hot Fuss handed out at Las Vegas gigs in 2003, which included songs from modern-day Hot Fuss, as well as multiple songs from Sawdust. "On Top" was released on a demo CD in 2003 known as 3-Song Demo, featuring "Mr. Brightside" and an early mix of "Jenny Was a Friend of Mine" known simply as "Jenny", as well as another 2003 demo CD known as 5-Song Demo, featuring the three from 3-Song Demo and early mixes of "Somebody Told Me" and "Glamorous Indie Rock & Roll" titled "Indie Rock And Roll". "On Top" was also featured on the Mr. Brightside EP, released in September 2003, but was formally released alongside the rest of Hot Fuss in the United Kingdom on June 7, 2004, and in the United States on June 15, 2004.

== Reception ==
"On Top" received fairly positive reviews upon release. NME compared the song as "icy synthtronica meets Springsteen" and describing its vocals as equal to Bono or Le Bon. PopMatters called "On Top" Hot Fuss' "finest moment," praising the "synthesizer-dominated dance track" for its "wonderful Duran Duran imitation with pure, unabashed, rosy-eyed euphoria, with Stoermer proving his worth by supplying a terrific, melodic, John Taylor style bassline," while The Pigeon Press called the song "one of the more forgettable moments on the album," noting that "despite being fun in its own right, a 'shimmy and a shake' snuck in here, The Killers’ electronic focus getting a little experimental and beeping there." The Spinnaker described the song as "driven by piercing synths and melodramatic vocals from [Brandon] Flowers. It’s easy to picture the glitz and glam Las Vegas has to offer in this track, but at the end, he suggests there’s more to life than that privilege." Silent Uproar called "On Top" a "great song ... with that careful use of keyboards matched up against strong guitars and slightly distorted vocals."

== Live performances ==
"On Top" has been played over 200 times as of November 2025. The song was debuted live at the Killers' inaugural UK show at Dublin Castle in London on September 16, 2003, over nine months before the release of Hot Fuss. The song was a regular number on the Hot Fuss Tour from 2003 to 2005, as well as the Sam's Town Tour throughout 2006 and 2007. "On Top" also saw a spike in performances preceding the concert residency celebrating 20 years of Hot Fuss in 2024.

== Credits and personnel ==
Credits adapted from the liner notes of Hot Fuss.

=== The Killers ===
- Brandon Flowers – vocals, synthesizer
- Dave Keuning – guitar
- Mark Stoermer – bass
- Ronnie Vannucci Jr. – drums

=== Technical ===
- Jeff Saltzman – production, recording
- The Killers – production
- Dave Stedronsky – engineering assistance
- Mark Needham – engineering assistance
- Will Brierre – engineering assistance
- Dario Dendi – engineering assistance
- Alan Moulder – mixing
- Brian "Big Bass" Gardner – mastering
