= Midnight Show =

2004 song by the Killers

Song by the Killers

from the album Hot Fuss
- Released: June 7, 2004
- Recorded: 2003
- Studio: The Hearse (Berkeley)
- Genre: Alternative rock; pop rock
- Length: 4:02
- Label: Island; Lizard King
- Songwriters: Brandon Flowers; Mark Stoermer
- Producers: Jeff Saltzman; the Killers

“Midnight Show” is a song by American rock band the Killers. It is the tenth track of the band’s debut studio album, Hot Fuss (2004). It was written by frontman Brandon Flowers and bassist Mark Stoermer, and produced by Jeff Saltzman and the Killers. The song, which depicts the murder of a young girl at the hands of her deranged ex-boyfriend, is the second of three installments in the Killers' "Murder Trilogy".

== Background ==
The song is written in the key of D# minor. Lyrically, the song depicts a story of a girl known as Jenny, the main protagonist of the Murder Trilogy, going out on a date and details how she was kidnapped and murdered by her ex-boyfriend, narrated by Flowers. Lyrics such as "I took my baby's breath beneath the chandelier of stars in atmosphere" or "she turned her face to speak, but no one heard her cry" suggest the antagonist murdered Jenny after their date. The song is the second out of three songs in the Killers' "Murder Trilogy", comprising "Leave the Bourbon on the Shelf" from their 2007 compilation album Sawdust and "Jenny Was a Friend of Mine", the opening track from Hot Fuss. Flowers said he was inspired to make the trilogy after listening to Morrissey's "Sister I'm a Poet", specifically "the romance of crime" line, in which he remarked that he "studied that line a lot. And it's kind of embedded in [him]".

== Release and reception ==
"Midnight Show" was released alongside the rest of Hot Fuss in the United Kingdom on June 7, 2004, and in the United States on June 15, 2004. The song received positive reviews from critics. Bring the Noise UK described the song as "a raucous rock anthem that eventually evolves into this circus-esque spectacle." Slant Magazine called the song "rollicking," while Cornell Sun praised how "Keuning’s contribution on the guitar right before the bridge continues to amplify [Flowers' menacing singing]." Journal of Popular Romance Studies proclaimed the song having "rock aggression with less masculine-coded emotional sensitivity to depict the most extreme reaction to rejection."

== Live performances ==
"Midnight Show" has been played live 159 times as of October 2025. The first time was at Don's Hill Bar in Hudson Square, New York in October 2003, eight months before the release of Hot Fuss. The song was mostly played live during the Hot Fuss Tour throughout 2004 and 2005, as well as the Sam's Town Tour in 2006 and 2007. The song was commonly played before "Jenny Was a Friend of Mine", and only twice after "Leave the Bourbon on the Shelf" from Sawdust, the three of which form the "Murder Trilogy". Both times the Murder Trilogy has been played live, “All These Things That I've Done” has been played after, which has led to speculation about its involvement in the trilogy.

== Credits and personnel ==
Credits adapted from the liner notes of Hot Fuss.

=== The Killers ===
- Brandon Flowers – vocals, synthesizer
- Dave Keuning – guitar
- Mark Stoermer – bass
- Ronnie Vannucci Jr. – drums

=== Technical ===
- Jeff Saltzman – production, recording
- The Killers – production
- Dave Stedronsky – engineering assistance
- Mark Needham – engineering assistance
- Will Brierre – engineering assistance
- Dario Dendi – engineering assistance
- Alan Moulder – mixing
- Brian "Big Bass" Gardner – mastering
