= Andy, You're a Star =

Song by the Killers

from the album Hot Fuss
- A-side: "All These Things That I've Done"
- Released: June 7, 2004
- Recorded: 2003
- Studio: The Hearse (Berkeley)
- Genre: Indie rock; alternative rock
- Length: 3:14
- Label: Island; Lizard King
- Songwriter: Brandon Flowers
- Producers: Jeff Saltzman; the Killers

“Andy, You're a Star” is a song by American rock band the Killers. It is the sixth track of the band’s debut studio album, Hot Fuss (2004). It was written by frontman Brandon Flowers, and produced by Jeff Saltzman and the Killers. The song was released as a B-side to "All These Things That I've Done".

== Background ==
"Andy, You're a Star" is written about frontman Brandon Flowers' time at Juab High School in Nephi, Utah, which he attended from 9th to 11th grade. Flowers originally commented that the song was about a crush he had on a classmate of his named Andy Messersmith, but later retracted his comment the song, saying instead that the song is written about "teachers [favouring] the football players and wrestlers. It's made known: these guys are special. In fact, the teachers encouraged the hierarchy, as a lot of them were coaches too." He also remarked that "the longhairs and the musicians, they would get treated the worst by the sportsmen and coaches. They were always bullied," and described the song as "a song for a loner" in an interview with NME. Flowers' further denied his comment about having a crush, proclaiming: "I've always been very aware of my sexuality. I'm very comfortable with that. I do like women," and when questioned about the "gay undertones" of the song, Flowers responded: "That's what you hear. I want people to make our songs their own. That's the beauty of art."

The song, which was produced by Jeff Saltzman and the Killers, is one of two songs on Hot Fuss to feature backing vocals from R&B girl group the Sweet Inspirations, known for their performances with Jimi Hendrix and Elvis Presley, with the other being "All These Things That I've Done".

== Release and reception ==
"Andy, You're a Star" was released alongside the rest of Hot Fuss in the United Kingdom on June 7, 2004, and in the United States on June 15, 2004. The song was met with positive reviews upon release. The Cornell Daily Sun called "Andy, You're a Star" a "more measured" song, with "the distorted fuzziness of [Brandon Flowers'] voice really compounds this effect, making him feel distant." The Pigeon Press praised the song, saying that "the stalling guitar and lower, atmospheric synth leave this track feeling intelligent and self-aware. Flowers’ voice here is full of a knowing empathy—he’s talking to Andy as both a spectator and a participant, watching someone spiral into a stardom that is now more a cage than a dream", while Drowned in Sound webzine complimented the song's "rhythmic, tinny guitars flick" and how they "hover along the surface of the melodies and linear, synthy basslines, their detachedness providing cool contrast to the dubiously named Brandon Flowers' overwrought vocals."

== Live performances ==
"Andy, You're a Star" has been performed live 180 times as of November 2025. The song was debuted at Las Vegas transgender bar Sasha's, now known as Tramps, in November 2003, seven months before the release of Hot Fuss. The song was then commonly played during the Hot Fuss Tour throughout 2004 and 2005, and also during the Wonderful Wonderful World Tour in 2017 and 2018, frequently following "The Calling". The song also saw a resurgence of performances preceding the 20 Years of Hot Fuss residency in 2024 and 2025.

== Credits and personnel ==
Credits adapted from the liner notes of Hot Fuss.

=== The Killers ===
- Brandon Flowers – vocals, synthesizer
- Dave Keuning – guitar
- Mark Stoermer – bass
- Ronnie Vannucci Jr. – drums

=== Additional musicians ===
- The Sweet Inspirations – gospel choir

=== Technical ===
- Jeff Saltzman – production, recording
- The Killers – production
- Dave Stedronsky – engineering assistance
- Mark Needham – engineering assistance
- Will Brierre – engineering assistance
- Dario Dendi – engineering assistance
- Alan Moulder – mixing
- Brian "Big Bass" Gardner – mastering
