= Tranquilize =

2007 song by the Killers

Single by the Killers featuring Lou Reed

from the album Sawdust
- Released: October 8, 2007
- Studio: Sear Sound (New York City)
- Length: 3:45
- Label: Island; Vertigo
- Songwriter: Brandon Flowers
- Producers: Flood; Alan Moulder; the Killers

The Killers singles chronology
"Shadowplay" (2007)	"Tranquilize" (2007)	"Don't Shoot Me Santa" (2007)

Lou Reed singles chronology
"Satellite of Love 2004" (2004)	"Tranquilize" (2007)	"The View" (2011)

Music video
- "Tranquilize" on YouTube

"Tranquilize" is a song by Las Vegas-based rock band the Killers, featuring Lou Reed. Written by Brandon Flowers, it is featured on the compilation album Sawdust. The song was made available for download on iTunes from October 12, 2007. A limited edition etched 7-inch vinyl of "Tranquilize" was available from November 5, featuring a lyric from the song hand-picked by Brandon Flowers etched on one side.

The song reached number 13 on the UK Singles Chart and also charted in Australia, Austria, and Canada. It won Best Track at NME's first ever USA awards. It was featured in a trailer for the fifth and final season of HBO's original series Boardwalk Empire.

== Background ==
"It took a day to break the ice with him," Brandon Flowers said of Lou Reed. "The second day of recording was a lot nicer than the first. On the first day we were all really stiff. It's funny, because you refer to him as 'Lou Reed', not 'Lou'. I remember somebody came into the studio. They could only stay in the room with him for two minutes. They left, saying, 'Lou Reed's really freaking me out.'"

== Music video ==
The music video features Flowers wandering around an empty house. Somewhere in the house is Reed, sitting at a piano. Flowers sings the song, including Reed's parts, making it look like he has been possessed. Intercut with this are shots of the rest of the band in a darkly lit, red room, around a table, apparently performing a seance. The video ends with Flowers finding and pointing at Reed, singing his outro.

== Live performances ==
In concert, Flowers changes the lyrics at the end from "the Bushes and the bombs are tranquilized" to "the vampires and the bombs are tranquilized".

== Awards and nominations ==
Year	Nominee / work	Award	Result
2008	NME Awards	Best Indie/Alternative Track	Won
2008	NME Awards	Best Video	Nominated

== Personnel ==
Personnel are taken from the Sawdust CD booklet.

The Killers

- Brandon Flowers
- Dave Keuning
- Mark Stoermer
- Ronnie Vannucci Jr.

Additional performers

- Lou Reed – additional guitar and vocals
- Mpho Manye – background vocals
- Tamara Robinson – background vocals
- Journi Gallwey – background vocals

Production

- Flood – production
- Alan Moulder – production, mixing
- The Killers – production
- TJ Doherty – recording

== Charts ==
Chart (2007)	Peak position
Australia (ARIA)	84
Austria (Ö3 Austria Top 40)	57
Canada Hot 100 (Billboard)	59
Scottish Singles Sales (Official Charts)	26
UK Singles (Official Charts)	13
