= Bright Lights (The Killers song) =

Single by the Killers
- Released: August 9, 2024
- Recorded: 2024
- Genre: Heartland rock; arena rock
- Length: 4:11
- Label: Island
- Songwriter: Brandon Flowers
- Producers: Stuart Price; Shawn Everett

The Killers singles chronology
"Your Side of Town" (2023)	"Bright Lights" (2024)

Music video
- "Bright Lights" on YouTube

"Bright Lights" is a song by American rock band the Killers, released as a non-album single on August 9, 2024 to coincide with their 20 Years of Hot Fuss residency. A music video, directed by Micah Bickham, was released on the same day.

The song received positive reviews from critics, with Rolling Stone calling the track a "rousing, upbeat track". The song peaked at No. 37 on Billboard's Alternative Airplay chart and No. 12 on Billboard's Adult Alternative Airplay chart.

== Background and release ==
"Bright Lights" was written by frontman Brandon Flowers, and produced by Stuart Price, known for producing Day & Age (2008), as well as Flowers' debut solo studio Flamingo (2010), and Shawn Everett, known for his work on the Killers' albums Imploding the Mirage (2020) and Pressure Machine (2021).

Flowers recalled in an interview with 89.3 KCMP radio that he got the idea for "Bright Lights" from an Elvis Presley song. He explained that he "thought about how we occasionally will cover 'Viva Las Vegas,' and that opening line, 'Bright-light city is going set my soul on fire,' and I just sort of used that as a launching pad, you know, 'Turn 'em on, because I'm coming home.' And it became kind of this beautiful metaphor for so many different things that you could apply it to," adding that he "started seeing all these beautiful analogies, and it sort of finished itself right away once I saw all that."

"Bright Lights" was first teased by the Killers on social media on July 29, 2024 with a short 9-second video, posted on Instagram and X, showing the stage for their upcoming 20 Years of Hot Fuss residency, which commenced later that year, with a small snippet of the song playing in the background. The next day, a second short video was posted to social media showing more of the residency stage with a different snippet of the song in the background. A third video detailing the stage, with a different snippet of the song, was posted the following day. The cover art for "Bright Lights" was revealed on both platforms on August 5, and the final 30 seconds of the song and music video were teased the day before release, August 8.

"Bright Lights" was released on streaming platforms on August 9, 2024, and the song was further played at all fifteen 20 Years of Hot Fuss shows. The song is the first time the four original members have played together, excluding one-off shows, since 2017.

== Music video ==
The music video for "Bright Lights" was released on August 9, 2024, the same day that the song was released. The video, directed by Micah Bickham, shows the band's original lineup, as well as background singers, dancing on the residency stage for their 20 Years of Hot Fuss residency at the Colosseum at Caesars Palace. The video was described as "glitzy" by NME, and has 2 million views on YouTube as of October 2025.

== Reception ==
The song received positive reviews from critics. Atwood Magazine praised the song for being "a larger-than-life anthem about keeping the dream alive," while NME remarked how the song "contained a bold, pulsing guitar part and triumphant echoed vocals from frontman Brandon Flowers." Euphoria Magazine explained how the song "delivers an anthemic punch that reminds us why The Killers have been a staple of the rock scene for over two decades." Consequence of Sound noted that the song is a "big, arena-ready song, offering a celebratory chorus centered on homecoming," with Rolling Stone describing the song as an anthemic single that "sees frontman Brandon Flowers celebrating Vegas."

== Charts ==
=== Weekly charts ===
Weekly chart performance for "Bright Lights"
Chart (2024)	Peak position
Canada Modern Rock (Billboard Canada)	7
Netherlands Airplay (MegaCharts)	32
New Zealand Hot Singles (RMNZ)	35
US Alternative Airplay (Billboard)	37
US Rock & Alternative Airplay (Billboard)	48
US Adult Alternative Airplay (Billboard)	12

=== Year-end charts ===
Year-end chart performance for "Bright Lights"
Chart (2025)	Position
Canada Mainstream Rock (Billboard)	73
Canada Modern Rock (Billboard)	34

== Release history ==
Region	Date	Format	Label	Ref.
Various	August 9, 2024	Digital download; streaming	Island	
