= Jenny Was a Friend of Mine =

2004 song by the Killers

Song by the Killers

from the album Hot Fuss
- Released: June 7, 2004
- Recorded: 2003
- Studio: Cornerstone (Berkeley, California)
- Genre: Rock
- Length: 4:04
- Label: Island; Lizard King
- Songwriters: Brandon Flowers; Mark Stoermer
- Producers: Jeff Saltzman; The Killers

Audio video
- "Jenny Was a Friend of Mine" on YouTube

"Jenny Was a Friend of Mine" is a song by American rock band the Killers. It is the opening track of the band's debut album, Hot Fuss (2004). It was written by Brandon Flowers and Mark Stoermer. Despite not being a single, "Jenny Was a Friend of Mine" is one of the Killers' most popular and critically acclaimed songs. It is particularly praised for Stoermer's powerful and melodic bassline.

== Writing and composition ==
The song, which is written in the key of E-flat minor, is told from the point of view of a boy who has been taken in for questioning about the murder of a girl named Jenny. After explaining the incident from his perspective, the boy (voiced by Flowers) says, "There ain't no motive for this crime, Jenny was a friend of mine." The song provides no resolution to the crime and it is never clarified if the boy was guilty. The song was inspired by the videotaped confession to police that Robert Chambers made the morning after the death of Jennifer Levin.

It is a part of the Killers' alleged "Murder Trilogy", three songs detailing the murder of a girl named Jenny, the other two being "Midnight Show" from Hot Fuss and "Leave the Bourbon on the Shelf" from the compilation album Sawdust. In an interview with The Guardian, Flowers revealed that it was Morrissey's song "Sister I'm a Poet" that inspired him to write songs about murder.

== Personnel ==
Credits adapted from the liner notes of Hot Fuss.

The Killers

- Brandon Flowers – vocals, synthesizer
- Dave Keuning – guitar
- Mark Stoermer – bass
- Ronnie Vannucci Jr. – drums

Production

- Jeff Saltzman – production, recording
- The Killers – production
- Dave Stedronsky – engineering assistance
- Mark Needham – engineering assistance
- Will Brierre – engineering assistance
- Dario Dendi – engineering assistance
- Alan Moulder – mixing
- Brian "Big Bass" Gardner – mastering

== Release and reception ==
The song was positively received by critics. In her review of Hot Fuss, Jenny Eliscu of Rolling Stone highlighted "Jenny Was a Friend of Mine" as sounding like "classic Duran Duran, all snaking bass lines and Flowers' elegantly wasted vocals — part ironic detachment, part fake-British-accent, part throat-shredding wail." Adrian Begrand, writing for PopMatters, called the song a "spot-on, wonderfully shameless Cure imitation", and praised Flowers for his "charmingly overwrought depiction of a lover's spat “on a promenade in the rain.”" In her "Ask Hadley" column in The Guardian, Hadley Freeman noted the similarity of the song's storyline to that of Richard Marx's 1991 hit single "Hazard" and accused the Killers of "blatantly rip[ping] off" the latter. NME said the song was like "Duran Duran with better basslines and dirtier hair". The Times wildly praised the song, saying "Jenny Was a Friend of Mine rejoices in a helicopter sound effect last heard when Oasis were going through their pompous phase, a bassline that New Order's Peter Hook would be proud of and a stupidly catchy melody that would fit primetime Duran Duran."

The song was on a CD included with the June 16, 2004, issue of NME. The CD, called Songs to Save Your Life, was compiled by Morrissey, "from his own record collection". "Jenny Was a Friend of Mine" is track #2 on the CD. It is also used as the opening theme music in The Damon Bruce Show, bumper music on CBS Sports's coverage of the PGA Tour and as a rejoiner bumper on the SiriusXM satellite radio hot talk show "The Opie & Anthony Show".

== Live performances ==
When the song is performed live, the line "she couldn't scream while I held her close", is often replaced by "she couldn't scream while I held her throat", or "she kicked and screamed while I held her throat", giving a more sinister feel to the song. This was more common during Day & Age World Tour performances of the song.

== Certifications ==
Region	Certification	Certified units/sales
Australia (ARIA)	Gold	35,000^{‡}
Canada (Music Canada)	Gold	40,000^{‡}
United Kingdom (BPI)	Silver	200,000^{‡}
United States (RIAA)	Gold	500,000^{‡}
^{‡} Sales+streaming figures based on certification alone.
