= Glamorous Indie Rock & Roll =

Promotional single by The Killers

from the album Hot Fuss
- Released: 2004
- Recorded: March–April 2003
- Studio: Cornerstone Studios (Berkeley, California)
- Genre: Post-punk revival; indie rock
- Length: 4:15
- Label: Lizard King
- Songwriters: Brandon Flowers; Dave Keuning; Mark Stoermer; Ronnie Vannucci Jr.
- Producers: Jeff Saltzman; The Killers

Audio video
- "Glamorous Indie Rock & Roll" on YouTube

"Glamorous Indie Rock & Roll" is a song by American rock band the Killers, included as a bonus track on the vinyl edition of their debut studio album, Hot Fuss (2004) on European editions, and replacing "Change Your Mind" on the UK and Australian editions. The song was issued as a promotional single in the United Kingdom in 2004.

== Overview ==
The lyrics are an ironic take on hipster culture. In August 2009, frontman Brandon Flowers told Time Out Chicago: "There's so much snobbery. You go through high school and all the paranoia and crap that goes with that. It's bullshit. I just didn't want to be like that. We like big songs and we're going to embrace it." The Killers' former tour manager Ryan Pardey said that the song was written about the band's early performances at Cafe Espresso Roma, which Pardey owned. Pardey described customers as "drinking coffee and reading the newspaper while The Killers played at Roma", remarking that "[e]veryone was too cool for school and not paying attention to them when they played."

In an interview with Rolling Stone in September 2009, Flowers cited "Glamorous Indie Rock & Roll" as his least favorite Killers song, stating that hearing the song makes him want to "crawl under a rock". However, in a comeback show in 2011 at London's Scala, The Killers played the song live for the first time in four years, since the earlier legs of the Sam's Town Tour. The following day, The Killers opened with "Glamorous Indie Rock & Roll" during their headlining act at Hard Rock Calling in Hyde Park, London.

== Release and reception ==
"Glamorous Indie Rock & Roll" was released as a promotional single in the United Kingdom in 2004, due to its popularity among fans. It became a regular number in the setlist until the end of the Sam's Town Tour.

A re-recorded version of the song is featured on the band's 2007 compilation album Sawdust.

Although not officially a single in the United States, the song reached number 13 on the Billboard Bubbling Under Hot 100 Singles chart and number 71 on the Billboard Pop 100 chart.

== Charts ==
Chart (2005)	Peak position
US Bubbling Under Hot 100 (Billboard)	13
US Digital Song Sales (Billboard)	62
US Pop 100 (Billboard)	71

== Certifications ==
Region	Certification	Certified units/sales
United Kingdom (BPI)	Silver	200,000^{‡}
^{‡} Sales+streaming figures based on certification alone.
