= Hot Fuss =

2004 studio album by the Killers

Studio album by the Killers
- Released: June 7, 2004
- Recorded: 2003
- Studios: The Hearse (Berkeley) (Note: Except "Everything Will Be Alright"); Cornerstone (Los Angeles); Dave Keuning's apartment (Las Vegas) (Note: "Everything Will Be Alright")
- Genres: Alternative rock; post-punk revival; new wave; art rock; synth-pop; dance-rock
- Length: 45:39
- Label: Island
- Producers: Jeff Saltzman; the Killers; Brandon Flowers

The Killers chronology
Hot Fuss (2004)	Sam's Town (2006)

Singles from Hot Fuss
- 1. "Mr. Brightside" Released: September 29, 2003; 2. "Somebody Told Me" Released: March 15, 2004; 3. "All These Things That I've Done" Released: August 30, 2004; 4. "Smile Like You Mean It" Released: March 14, 2005

Hot Fuss is the debut studio album by American rock band the Killers, released on June 7, 2004, in the United Kingdom and on June 15, 2004, in the United States by Island Records. The album's music is mostly influenced by new wave and post-punk. Hot Fuss spawned four critically and commercially successful singles: "Mr. Brightside", "Somebody Told Me", "All These Things That I've Done" and "Smile Like You Mean It".

The album reached number seven on the Billboard 200 and number one on the UK Albums Chart. As of December 2012, Hot Fuss had sold more than seven million copies worldwide, including more than three million in the United States and more than two million in the United Kingdom. It has also been certified platinum or multi-platinum in Australia, Canada, Ireland, and New Zealand. The album and its first three singles went on to garner five Grammy Award nominations at the 47th Annual Grammy Awards in 2005.

== Background ==
The album was recorded throughout 2003 with Jeff Saltzman in Berkeley, California, except for "Everything Will Be Alright", which was recorded by Corlene Byrd in guitarist Dave Keuning's apartment. Many of the tracks were originally recorded as demos, which the band decided to keep for their spontaneity. The album was mixed by Mark Needham at Cornerstone Studios in Los Angeles and Alan Moulder at Eden Studios in London. In 2012, Brandon Flowers told NME that he felt "depressed" after hearing the Strokes' album Is This It. "That record just sounded so perfect", he said. "We threw away everything [we were working on] and the only song that made the cut and remained was 'Mr. Brightside.'"

The songs "Midnight Show" and "Jenny Was a Friend of Mine" are two parts of the so-called "Murder Trilogy", detailing the fictional story of a woman whom her jealous boyfriend murders. The first part, "Leave the Bourbon on the Shelf", appears on the band's B-sides and rarities compilation, Sawdust.

== Production ==
The album heavily features a vocal effect called Echo Farm on Flowers' voice. In 2014, Needham recounted:

"There were three of us involved in the production company on that record: Braden Merrick, Jeff Saltzman and myself. Jeff and I had been partners for a few years. He was an entertainment attorney and was shopping stuff, but he actually really wanted to be a producer as well. We set Jeff up with a studio, got him started in recording and since he’s a smart guy, he picked it up really quick. At that time, Echo Farm had just come out, and that was really the only vocal effect he had. If you open up Echo Farm, the first setting that comes up is the default setting, which overdrives the vocal a bit and sets an 84 ms delay. That was basically what he put on everything and it sort of became the default vocal tone on the whole record, plus it worked really great, so we kept it. It changes a little bit on certain things, but it was a fairly consistent effect through the whole record."

== Artwork ==
The album cover was photographed by Matthias Clamer in 2000, in the southern region of the suburbs of Beijing, China. The characters on top of each building ("建", "材", "开", and "发") translate to "construction material development".

== Release and reception ==
Professional ratings
Aggregate scores
Source	Rating
Metacritic	66/100
Review scores
Source	Rating
AllMusic	5/5 stars
Alternative Press	4/5
Blender	4/5 stars
Entertainment Weekly	C
The Independent	5/5 stars
NME	7/10
Pitchfork	5.2/10
Q	3/5 stars
Rolling Stone	3.5/5 stars
Spin	3.5/5 stars

Hot Fuss received generally positive reviews from critics. On Metacritic, the album has a weighted average score of 66 out of 100 based on 20 reviews, indicating "generally favorable reviews".

Hot Fuss was released on June 7, 2004, in the United Kingdom and on June 15, 2004, in the United States. In 2005, it was reissued as a box of eleven seven-inch vinyl discs, with an album track on each A-side and non-album tracks on the B-sides. The album reached number seven on the US Billboard 200. It was certified triple platinum by the Recording Industry Association of America (RIAA) on December 1, 2005, and as of January 2017, it had sold 3.75 million copies in the United States.

Hot Fuss topped the UK Albums Chart for two consecutive weeks in January 2005. It was the 26th bestselling album of the 2000s decade in the United Kingdom, and is listed among the top 40 longest-charting albums in the history of the UK Albums Chart, with 254 weeks. On July 22, 2013, the British Phonographic Industry (BPI) certified the album septuple platinum; by August 2020, it had sold 2,335,495 copies in the UK. In 2022 the album was named as the 20th most successful debut album in UK chart history. The album has also been certified platinum or multi-platinum in Australia, Canada, Ireland, and New Zealand. Hot Fuss had sold over seven million copies worldwide as of December 2012.

Rolling Stone ranked Hot Fuss 43rd on its list of the "100 Best Albums of the Decade", and it was, at one point, listed among the 1001 Albums You Must Hear Before You Die. Gigwise readers voted it the number-one "Best Debut Album of All Time" in 2013. Rolling Stone ranked Hot Fuss the 33rd of its list of "The 100 Greatest Debut Albums of All Time".

=== Accolades ===
Year	Ceremony	Award	Result
2004	Shortlist Music Prize	Shortlist Music Prize	Nominated
2005	BRIT Awards	Best International Album	Nominated
2005	Grammy Awards	Best Rock Album	Nominated
2005	Meteor Ireland Music Awards	Best International Album	Nominated

Publication	Country	Accolade	Year	Rank
Drowned in Sound	UK	Best Albums of the Year	2004	2
Gigwise	US	Best Debut Album Ever: Readers' Poll	2013	1
NME	US	500 Greatest Albums of All Time	2013	495
Q	UK	250 Best Albums of Q's Lifetime 1986–2010	2011	17
Rolling Stone	US	Top 100 Albums of the 2000s	2009	43
Rolling Stone	US	100 Greatest Debut Albums of All Time	2013	33
Rolling Stone	US	10 Greatest Debut Albums of All Time: Readers' Poll	2013	9
The A.V. Club	US	Top 100 Albums of the 2000s	2009	41

Hot Fuss is listed among the 1001 Albums You Must Hear Before You Die.

== Track listing ==
All tracks are produced by Jeff Saltzman and the Killers, except "Everything Will Be Alright", produced by Brandon Flowers.

No.	Title	Writer(s)	Length
1.	"Jenny Was a Friend of Mine"	Flowers; Mark Stoermer	4:04
2.	"Mr. Brightside"	Flowers; Dave Keuning	3:43
3.	"Smile Like You Mean It"	Flowers; Stoermer	3:54
4.	"Somebody Told Me"	Flowers; Keuning; Stoermer; Ronnie Vannucci Jr.	3:17
5.	"All These Things That I've Done"	Flowers	5:01
6.	"Andy, You're a Star"	Flowers	3:14
7.	"On Top"	Flowers; Keuning; Stoermer; Vannucci	4:18
8.	"Change Your Mind"	Flowers; Keuning	3:11
9.	"Believe Me Natalie"	Flowers; Vannucci	5:05
10.	"Midnight Show"	Flowers; Stoermer	4:02
11.	"Everything Will Be Alright"	Flowers	5:45

Alternate track on UK and Australian editions
No.	Title	Writer(s)	Length
8.	"Glamorous Indie Rock & Roll"	Flowers; Keuning; Stoermer; Vannucci	4:14

Bonus track on US vinyl edition
No.	Title	Writer(s)	Length
12.	"Glamorous Indie Rock & Roll"	Flowers; Keuning; Stoermer; Vannucci	4:14

Bonus tracks on European edition
No.	Title	Writer(s)	Length
12.	"Glamorous Indie Rock & Roll"	Flowers; Keuning; Stoermer; Vannucci	4:14
13.	"Somebody Told Me" (music video)

Bonus tracks on the Enhanced edition
No.	Title	Writer(s)	Length
12.	"Glamorous Indie Rock & Roll"	Flowers; Keuning; Stoermer; Vannucci	4:14
13.	"Mr. Brightside" (Jacques Lu Cont's Thin White Duke mix)	Flowers; Keuning	4:38
14.	"Somebody Told Me" (music video)		3:18
15.	"Mr. Brightside" (music video)		3:44

Bonus tracks on Japanese and US 2005 limited edition
No.	Title	Writer(s)	Length
12.	"Glamorous Indie Rock & Roll"	Flowers; Keuning; Stoermer; Vannucci	4:14
13.	"The Ballad of Michael Valentine"	Flowers; Keuning	3:49
14.	"Under the Gun"	Flowers; Keuning	2:33

iTunes Store deluxe edition bonus tracks
No.	Title	Length
12.	"Somebody Told Me" (Mylo mix)	7:17
13.	"Smile Like You Mean It" (Fischerspooner mix)	6:24
14.	"Smile Like You Mean It" (Ruff and Jam Eastside mix)	7:35

7-inch limited edition box set B-sides
No.	Title	Length
1.	"Somebody Told Me" (Josh Harris remix)
2.	"Under the Gun"
3.	"Show You How"
4.	"The Ballad of Michael Valentine"
5.	"Why Don't You Find Out for Yourself?"
6.	"Ruby, Don't Take Your Love to Town"
7.	"Mr. Brightside" (Thin White Duke remix edit)
8.	"Glamorous Indie Rock and Roll"
9.	"Smile Like You Mean It" (acoustic version)
10.	"Who Let You Go?"
11.	"Get Trashed"

Bonus DVD on Japanese limited tour edition
No.	Title	Length
1.	"Somebody Told Me" (music video)
2.	"Mr. Brightside" (original music video)
3.	"Mr. Brightside" (new music video)
4.	"All These Things That I've Done" (music video)

Bonus DVD on UK special edition
No.	Title	Length
1.	"Smile Like You Mean It" (music video)
2.	"All These Things That I've Done" (music video)
3.	"Somebody Told Me" (Glastonbury 2005)
4.	"Jenny Was a Friend of Mine" (Glastonbury 2005)
5.	"Mr. Brightside" (Glastonbury 2005)

== Personnel ==
Credits adapted from the liner notes of Hot Fuss.

=== The Killers ===
- Brandon Flowers – vocals, synthesizer
- Dave Keuning – guitar
- Mark Stoermer – bass
- Ronnie Vannucci Jr. – drums

=== Additional musicians ===
- Sweet Inspirations – gospel choir on "All These Things That I've Done" and "Andy, You're a Star"

=== Technical ===
- Jeff Saltzman – production, recording (all except "Everything Will Be Alright")
- The Killers – production (all except "Everything Will Be Alright")
- Brandon Flowers – production on "Everything Will Be Alright"
- Corlene Byrd – recording on "Everything Will Be Alright"
- Dave Stedronsky – engineering assistance
- Mark Needham – engineering assistance (all tracks); mixing (Note: Mixed at Cornerstone Recording Studios (Los Angeles, California)) (tracks 2, 3, 8, 11, "Glamorous Indie Rock & Roll")
- Will Brierre – engineering assistance
- Dario Dendi – engineering assistance
- Alan Moulder – mixing (Note: Mixed at Eden Studios (London) and The Town House (London)) (tracks 1, 4–7, 9, 10)
- Brian "Big Bass" Gardner – mastering (Note: Mastered at Bernie Grundman Mastering (Hollywood, California))

=== Artwork ===
- Louis Marino – art direction
- Seth Goldfarb – cover photo
- Matt Hartman – band photography

== Charts ==
=== Weekly charts ===
Weekly chart performance for Hot Fuss
Chart (2004–2009, 2026)	Peak position
Australian Albums (ARIA)	1
Austrian Albums (Ö3 Austria)	60
Belgian Albums (Ultratop Flanders)	95
Belgian Albums (Ultratop Wallonia)	66
Canadian Albums (Billboard)	4
Dutch Albums (Album Top 100)	46
European Albums (Billboard)	6
Finnish Albums (Suomen virallinen lista)	15
French Albums (SNEP)	8
German Albums (Offizielle Top 100)	34
Greek International Albums (IFPI)	7
Irish Albums (IRMA)	1
Italian Albums (FIMI)	36
Japanese Albums (Oricon)	101
Mexican Albums (Top 100 Mexico)	88
New Zealand Albums (RMNZ)	5
Scottish Albums (Official Charts)	1
Spanish Albums (Promusicae)	35
Swiss Albums (Schweizer Hitparade)	48
UK Albums (Official Charts)	1
UK Independent Albums (Official Charts)	1
UK R&B Albums (Official Charts)	12
US Billboard 200	7

=== Year-end charts ===
2004 year-end chart performance for Hot Fuss
Chart (2004)	Position
UK Albums (OCC)	41
US Billboard 200	148

2005 year-end chart performance for Hot Fuss
Chart (2005)	Position
Australian Albums (ARIA)	19
European Albums (Billboard)	16
French Albums (SNEP)	79
Irish Albums (IRMA)	8
New Zealand Albums (RMNZ)	21
UK Albums (OCC)	12
US Billboard 200	17
Worldwide Albums (IFPI)	28

2006 year-end chart performance for Hot Fuss
Chart (2006)	Position
UK Albums (OCC)	72

2007 year-end chart performance for Hot Fuss
Chart (2007)	Position
Belgian Midprice Albums (Ultratop Flanders)	6
Belgian Midprice Albums (Ultratop Wallonia)	40
UK Albums (OCC)	93

2008 year-end chart performance for Hot Fuss
Chart (2008)	Position
UK Albums (OCC)	124

2009 year-end chart performance for Hot Fuss
Chart (2009)	Position
UK Albums (OCC)	115

2018 year-end chart performance for Hot Fuss
Chart (2018)	Position
Australian Vinyl Albums (ARIA)	32

2019 year-end chart performance for Hot Fuss
Chart (2019)	Position
Australian Vinyl Albums (ARIA)	87

=== Decade-end charts ===
2000s decade-end chart performance for Hot Fuss
Chart (2000–2009)	Position
Australian Albums (ARIA)	97
UK Albums (OCC)	26
US Billboard 200	131

2010s decade-end chart performance for Hot Fuss
Chart (2010–2019)	Position
UK Vinyl Albums (OCC)	49

== Certifications ==
Certifications for Hot Fuss
Region	Certification	Certified units/sales
Argentina (CAPIF)	Gold	20,000^{^}
Australia (ARIA)	6× Platinum	420,000^{‡}
Belgium (BRMA)	Gold	25,000^{*}
Canada (Music Canada)	8× Platinum	800,000^{‡}
Denmark (IFPI Danmark)	2× Platinum	40,000^{‡}
France (SNEP)	Gold	100,000^{*}
Germany (BVMI)	3× Gold	300,000^{‡}
Italy (FIMI) sales since 2009	Gold	25,000^{‡}
New Zealand (RMNZ)	4× Platinum	60,000^{‡}
Singapore (RIAS)	Gold	5,000^{*}
South Korea	—	2,623
United Kingdom (BPI)	8× Platinum	2,400,000^{‡}
United States (RIAA)	6× Platinum	6,000,000^{‡}
Summaries
Europe (IFPI)	Platinum	1,000,000^{*}
Worldwide	—	7,000,000
^{*} Sales figures based on certification alone.^{^} Shipments figures based on certification alone.^{‡} Sales+streaming figures based on certification alone.

== Release history ==
Release history for Hot Fuss
Region	Date	Label
United Kingdom	June 7, 2004	Lizard King
United States	June 15, 2004	Island

== See also ==
- List of best-selling albums of the 2000s (decade) in the United Kingdom
