= Sawdust (album) =

2007 compilation album by the Killers

Compilation album by the Killers
- Released: November 9, 2007
- Recorded: 2002–2007
- Genre: Alternative rock; indie rock; post-punk revival
- Length: 72:13
- Label: Island
- Producer: Flood; the Killers; Alan Moulder; Stuart Price; Jeff Saltzman

The Killers chronology
Sam's Town (2006)	Sawdust (2007)	Day & Age (2008)

Singles from Sawdust
- 1. "Shadowplay" Released: October 8, 2007; 2. "Tranquilize" Released: October 12, 2007

Sawdust is a compilation album by American rock band the Killers, released on November 9, 2007, by Island Records. The album consists mostly of B-sides, but also includes a number of previously unreleased tracks. The songs on the album were recorded between 2002 and 2007.

== Background ==
Professional ratings
Aggregate scores
Source	Rating
Metacritic	65/100
Review scores
Source	Rating
AllMusic	3/5 stars
BBC Music	Favorable
Billboard	Favorable
Entertainment Weekly	B
Melodic	3.5/5 stars
musicOMH	3/5 stars
NME	6/10
Now	3/5
Pitchfork	5.5/10.0
Rolling Stone	3/5 stars

The album was first mentioned by Brandon Flowers in an interview with Billboard in late August 2007. Rolling Stone revealed the name of the compilation in its "Smoking Section" on September 6, 2007. Sawdust was inspired by B-sides collections such as Oasis' The Masterplan, the Smashing Pumpkins' Pisces Iscariot and Nirvana's Incesticide.

"Our most metal song is 'All the Pretty Faces' on Sawdust…" observed guitarist Dave Keuning. "That's a part of who I am. When you're in eighth grade, you're into AC/DC and Metallica. And any guitarist who says they weren't is lying."

The UK and Australian editions of the compilation included an additional track "Change Your Mind" as it was replaced with "Glamorous Indie Rock & Roll" on original release of Hot Fuss album in those countries.

== Commercial performance ==
Sawdust debuted at number 12 on the US Billboard 200, selling 82,000 copies in its first week. The album was certified platinum by the British Phonographic Industry (BPI) on April 4, 2008, and had sold 493,000 copies in the United Kingdom by August 2020. It was also certified platinum by the Irish Recorded Music Association (IRMA) for sales of 15,000 copies.

== Track listing ==
No.	Title	Writer(s)	Release	Length
1.	"Tranquilize" (featuring Lou Reed) (NYC, Summer '07)	Brandon Flowers	Previously unreleased	3:45
2.	"Shadowplay" (Sam's Town sessions, '06)	Ian Curtis; Peter Hook; Stephen Morris; Bernard Sumner	Music From The Motion Picture Control	4:07
3.	"All the Pretty Faces" (Sam's Town sessions, '06)	Flowers; Dave Keuning; Mark Stoermer	"When You Were Young" single	4:46
4.	"Leave the Bourbon on the Shelf" (Dave's apartment, '02 and Las Vegas, Fall '07)	Flowers	Previously unreleased	3:38
5.	"Sweet Talk" (Sam's Town sessions, '06 and Las Vegas, Fall '07)	Flowers; Keuning; Stoermer; Ronnie Vannucci Jr.	Previously unreleased	4:19
6.	"Under the Gun" (Hot Fuss sessions, '03 and Las Vegas, Fall '07)	Flowers; Keuning	Re-recorded version previously unreleased, original version from "Somebody Told Me" single	2:34
7.	"Where the White Boys Dance" (Sam's Town sessions, '06)	Flowers	"When You Were Young" single	3:26
8.	"Show You How" (Hot Fuss sessions, '03)	Flowers	"Somebody Told Me" single	2:46
9.	"Move Away" (Sam's Town sessions, '06)	Flowers; Keuning; Stoermer	Music from and Inspired by Spider-Man 3	3:50
10.	"Glamorous Indie Rock and Roll" (Hot Fuss sessions, '03 and Las Vegas, Fall '07)	Flowers; Keuning; Stoermer; Vannucci	Re-recorded version previously unreleased, original version from Hot Fuss	4:17
11.	"Who Let You Go?" (Hot Fuss sessions, '03)	Flowers; Keuning; Vannucci; Stoermer	"Mr. Brightside" single	3:43
12.	"The Ballad of Michael Valentine" (Hot Fuss sessions, '03)	Flowers; Keuning	"Somebody Told Me" single	3:50
13.	"Ruby, Don't Take Your Love to Town" (BBC sessions, '05)	Mel Tillis	"Smile Like You Mean It" single	3:05
14.	"Daddy's Eyes" (Sam's Town sessions, '06)	Flowers	"Bones" single	4:15
15.	"Sam's Town" (Abbey Road Version) (Abbey Road sessions, '06)	Flowers	"For Reasons Unknown" single	3:44
16.	"Romeo and Juliet" (Abbey Road sessions, '07)	Mark Knopfler	"For Reasons Unknown" single	5:28
17.	"Mr. Brightside" (Jacques Lu Cont's Thin White Duke Remix)	Flowers; Keuning	"Mr. Brightside" single	10:40
18.	"Questions with the Captain" (hidden track)	Flowers; Keuning; Stoermer; Vannucci	Previously unreleased
Total length:				72:13

Additional track on UK and Australian editions
No.	Title	Writer(s)	Release	Length
17.	"Change Your Mind" (Hot Fuss sessions, '03)	Flowers; Keuning	Hot Fuss	3:13

== Personnel ==
Personnel taken from the CD booklet of Sawdust.

The Killers

- Brandon Flowers
- Dave Keuning
- Mark Stoermer
- Ronnie Vannucci Jr.

Additional performers

- Lou Reed – additional guitar and vocals on "Tranquilize"
- Mpho Manye – background vocals on "Tranquilize"
- Tamara Robinson – background vocals on "Tranquilize"
- Journi Gallwey – background vocals on "Tranquilize"
- Andy Savours – additional guitars on "Shadowplay"
- Ted Sablay – additional synthesizer on "Sam's Town"

Production

- Flood: tracks 1, 3, 5, 7, 9, 14
- Alan Moulder: tracks 1, 3, 5, 7, 9, 14
- The Killers: tracks 1–12, 14, 17, also "Change Your Mind" on UK and Australian editions
- Stuart Price: tracks 4, additional production on track 5
- Jeff Saltzman: tracks 6, 8, 10–12, 17, also "Change Your Mind" on UK and Australian editions
- Jacques Lu Cont: remix producer on track 17

== Charts ==
=== Weekly charts ===
Chart (2007–2009)	Peak position
Australian Albums (ARIA)	6
Austrian Albums (Ö3 Austria)	35
Belgian Albums (Ultratop Flanders)	66
Canadian Albums (Billboard)	10
Dutch Albums (Album Top 100)	72
French Albums (SNEP)	93
German Albums (Offizielle Top 100)	53
Irish Albums (IRMA)	13
Japanese Albums (Oricon)	202
Mexican Albums (Top 100 Mexico)	24
New Zealand Albums (RMNZ)	18
Norwegian Albums (VG-lista)	29
Scottish Albums (OCC)	7
Spanish Albums (Promusicae)	80
Swiss Albums (Schweizer Hitparade)	33
UK Albums (OCC)	7
US Billboard 200	12
US Top Alternative Albums (Billboard)	1
US Top Rock Albums (Billboard)	3

=== Year-end charts ===
Chart (2007)	Position
Australian Albums (ARIA)	100
UK Albums (OCC)	79

Chart (2008)	Position
UK Albums (OCC)	104
US Billboard 200	140

== Certifications ==
Region	Certification	Certified units/sales
Argentina (CAPIF)	Platinum	40,000^{^}
Australia (ARIA)	Gold	35,000^{^}
Canada (Music Canada)	Gold	50,000^{‡}
Ireland (IRMA)	Platinum	15,000^{^}
United Kingdom (BPI)	Platinum	493,000
^{^} Shipments figures based on certification alone.^{‡} Sales+streaming figures based on certification alone.
