= Smile Like You Mean It =

2005 single by the Killers

Single by the Killers

from the album Hot Fuss
- B-side: "Ruby, Don't Take Your Love to Town"; "Get Trashed"; "Change Your Mind"
- Released: March 14, 2005
- Studio: Cornerstone (Berkeley, California)
- Genre: New wave; synth-rock; indie dance
- Length: 3:54
- Label: Island; Lizard King
- Songwriters: Brandon Flowers; Mark Stoermer
- Producers: Jeff Saltzman; the Killers

The Killers singles chronology
"All These Things That I've Done" (2004)	"Smile Like You Mean It" (2005)	"When You Were Young" (2006)

Music video
- "Smile Like You Mean It" on YouTube

"Smile Like You Mean It" is a song by American rock band the Killers, written by lead vocalist Brandon Flowers and bassist Mark Stoermer. Originally included as a B-side on the "Mr. Brightside" single, it also appears on their debut studio album, Hot Fuss (2004). It was the third single from the album released in the United States and the fourth in the United Kingdom, reaching number 15 on the US Billboard Modern Rock Tracks chart and number 11 on the UK Singles Chart. It also received substantial radio airplay in Australia, where it was ranked number 39 on Triple J's Hottest 100 of 2004.

== Background ==
The Killers state that the song was written in just eight minutes. According to Brandon Flowers, the lyric "Looking back at sunsets on the East side" refers to the East side of Las Vegas, Nevada.

== Critical reception ==
Billboard said the song "seems to deal with coming to terms with growing up and getting older." Chuck Arnold with People magazine called the song "a sardonic moper worthy of the Smiths." Billboard said the single is "more restrained and downtempo compared with the band's previous hits" but otherwise "pretty upbeat and is awash with soaring new wave synthesizers and 'killer' guitars." In the UK, the song was voted at 91 on Absolute Radio's 100 Best Songs of the Decade. Paste and American Songwriter both ranked the song number seven on their lists of the greatest Killers songs.

== Music video ==
The music video for the song shows ghostly figures of the band wandering around a house that the characters of the song presumably used to live in. While Flowers sings to the camera, flashbacks of the old house are shown behind him, including a children's party, a Christmas morning, a high school party, and a funeral. While these extras are oblivious to being watched, at the end they turn to the camera to look at the viewer while the band fades away.

== Track listing ==
UK 7-inch red vinyl single

A. "Smile Like You Mean It"
B. "Ruby, Don't Take Your Love to Town" (Zane Lowe Radio 1 session)

UK CD single

1. "Smile Like You Mean It"
2. "Get Trashed"

UK 12-inch single

1. "Smile Like You Mean It" (Ruff & Jam Eastside mix)
2. "Mr Brightside" (Jacques Lu Cont's Thin White Duke dub mix)

UK digital single

1. "Smile Like You Mean It" (Fischerspooner remix) – 6:26
2. "Smile Like You Mean It" (Ruff & Jam Eastside mix) – 7:34
3. "Get Trashed" – 3:39

Australian CD single

1. "Smile Like You Mean It"
2. "Change Your Mind"
3. "Mr Brightside" (The Lindbergh Palace radio remix)

== Personnel ==
Personnel are adapted from the liner notes of Hot Fuss.

The Killers

- Brandon Flowers – vocals, synthesizer
- Dave Keuning – guitar
- Mark Stoermer – bass
- Ronnie Vannucci Jr. – drums

Production

- Jeff Saltzman – production, recording
- The Killers – production
- Dave Stedronsky – engineering assistance
- Mark Needham – engineering assistance, mixing
- Will Brierre – engineering assistance
- Dario Dendi – engineering assistance
- Brian "Big Bass" Gardner – mastering

== Charts ==
=== Weekly charts ===
Chart (2005)	Peak position
Australia (ARIA)	47
Ireland (IRMA)	20
Scottish Singles Sales (Official Charts)	9
UK Singles (Official Charts)	11
UK Indie (Official Charts)	1
US Alternative Airplay (Billboard)	15

=== Year-end charts ===
Chart (2005)	Position
US Modern Rock Tracks (Billboard)	55

== Certifications ==
Region	Certification	Certified units/sales
Australia (ARIA)	Platinum	70,000^{‡}
Canada (Music Canada)	Gold	40,000^{‡}
New Zealand (RMNZ)	Gold	15,000^{‡}
United Kingdom (BPI)	Platinum	600,000^{‡}
United States (RIAA)	Platinum	1,000,000^{‡}
^{‡} Sales+streaming figures based on certification alone.

== Release history ==
Region	Date	Format(s)	Label(s)	Ref(s).
United States	March 14, 2005	Alternative radio	Island	
Australia	April 25, 2005	CD	Lizard King	
United Kingdom	May 2, 2005	7-inch vinyl; 12-inch vinyl; CD; digital download	Lizard King	
United Kingdom	May 9, 2005	CD	Lizard King	

== Covers and remixes ==
David Gray performed an acoustic version of "Smile Like You Mean It" on BBC's Radio 1 in the Live Lounge. "Smile Like You Mean It" was remixed by French music producer Madeon. Tally Hall also covered the song for The O.C.
