= All These Things That I've Done =

2004 single by the Killers

Single by the Killers

from the album Hot Fuss
- B-side: "Andy, You're a Star"; "Why Don't You Find Out for Yourself"
- Released: August 30, 2004
- Studio: The Hearse (Berkeley, California)
- Genre: Alternative rock; soul
- Length: 5:01 (album version); 3:53 (radio and single edit)
- Label: Island; Lizard King
- Songwriter: Brandon Flowers
- Producers: Jeff Saltzman; the Killers

The Killers singles chronology
"Somebody Told Me" (2004)	"All These Things That I've Done" (2004)	"Smile Like You Mean It" (2005)

Audio sample
- file; help

Music video
- "All These Things That I've Done" on YouTube

"All These Things That I've Done" is a song by American rock band the Killers. The song was released as the third single from the band's debut studio album, Hot Fuss (2004), on August 30, 2004. It was written by frontman Brandon Flowers and features gospel choir The Sweet Inspirations. The song is about television host Matt Pinfield, and his work with the US Army, as part of a program that mentored wounded/PTSD-stricken soldiers returning from Iraq.

"All These Things That I've Done" was released as the third single from Hot Fuss in 2004 in the United Kingdom and as the fourth single in the United States and Australia in 2005, peaking at number 74 on the US Billboard Hot 100, number 42 on the Australian ARIA Charts and number 18 on the UK Singles Chart.

== Writing ==
=== Lyrics ===
The song is about television host Matt Pinfield. Before the Killers were famous, Pinfield, who was a vice president of A&R at Columbia Records at the time, tried to sign the band. He was also working with the US Army as part of a program that mentored wounded or PTSD-stricken musician soldiers returning from Iraq. After visiting veteran soldiers in Colorado City, he went to Las Vegas, where he quickly bonded with the Killers. Pinfield watched the band rehearse at drummer Ronnie Vannucci's garage and took them out to dinner. He asked if anybody wanted to give him a ride back to his hotel and Brandon Flowers offered to drive Pinfield. The two wound up at a Las Vegas bar, where Pinfield said:

I started to tell him the story about mentoring soldiers, and I was getting ready to go through a divorce. I was going through a bit of a rough time. So, he went home that night, and their old manager, Braden Merrick, calls me on the phone, and goes, 'Hey Matt, Brandon wrote a song about you. He went home last night and wrote this song.' It was 'All These Things That I've Done,' and the line I've got soul, but I'm not a soldier is about the mentoring thing.

In 2016, Pinfield titled his memoir All These Things That I've Done: My Insane, Improbable Rock Life. On January 19, 2019, the band gave Pinfield a shoutout while introducing the song at the iHeartRadio ALTer Ego 2019 festival at The Forum in Inglewood, California, where Pinfield was in attendance in a wheelchair still recovering from being hit by a car a month before.

Lead vocalist Brandon Flowers revealed the lines in the chorus "Help me out, yeah yeah, you gotta help me out/Don't you put me on the back burner, you gotta help me out" "was just trying to be Lou Reed funneled through the Las Vegas Strip."

=== Music ===
Flowers cited Irish rock band U2 as a major influence during the song's production. In a 2015 interview, he elaborated about the song:

"I think it's got such a strong sense of identity. I was heavily into U2 at the time, and the way that they incorporated gospel to their music... That was something that had a huge effect on me, and you really hear it in this song... everything from the chord progression to the actual gospel choir we recorded with. There's something to guitar music and gospel. You can make something that feels unique and honourable."

In a blog for NME in 2013, Flowers specified U2's 2000 album All That You Can't Leave Behind as a direct influence on the track and that he "wanted a song that stood up to those songs". He further mentioned the bassline was inspired by David Bowie's song "Slow Burn" from the 2002 album Heathen. Further influences on the track include glam rock album Transformer by Lou Reed, and Ziggy Stardust, a character created by Bowie in the 1970s.

== Critical reception ==
The song was acclaimed by critics upon release. Bill Lamb of About.com gave the song 4 out of 5 stars, noting its strength as a pop-rock anthem. Jemma Volp-Fletcher gave the single a perfect score of 10 out of 10, calling it "staggering", while also complimenting frontman Flowers' songwriting skills. musicOMH's Sara McDonnell was also impressed, saying that it had "classic song' written all over it". In 2009, The Daily Telegraph listed it among the "100 Greatest Songs of All Time". In 2020, Paste ranked the song number two on their list of the 20 greatest Killers songs, and in 2021, American Songwriter ranked the song number six on their list of the 10 greatest Killers songs. In December 2005, the song was nominated for Best Rock Performance by a Duo or Group with Vocal at the 48th Grammy Awards, but lost to "Sometimes You Can't Make It on Your Own" by U2.

== Performances and covers ==
The song is a concert staple for the band, having been played live the third-most frequently of all songs. It was one of the band's breakout singles, with lead vocalist Brandon Flowers saying that during one of the bands first trips to the UK for the NME awards, "Noel [Gallagher] came backstage and said he'd worked out how to play All These Things That I've Done. It was so surreal, because less than a year before, I was sitting on my bed with a guitar, without a record deal, trying to work out Oasis tracks."

The band performed the song at Live 8, a charity campaign series of concerts held in July 2005. In 2009, The Killers, Coldplay, Bono (U2), and Gary Barlow (Take That) performed the track together to support a special War Child concert following the BRIT Awards. Fellow Las Vegas band Panic! At the Disco members Brendon Urie and Ryan Ross slow danced to the song according to the December 2006 issue of Kerrang!. A popular song among alternative rock bands, "All These Things That I've Done" has been covered live by numerous artists including U2, Coldplay, Imagine Dragons, Walk the Moon, Kris Allen, and Robbie Williams.

== Music videos ==
The song has two music videos, the earlier of which was filmed in July 2004. It features the band singing while walking down Brick Lane, London, whilst accompanied by a crowd. The video also featured shots of the audience who attended the band's concert at the London Astoria on July 8, 2004. The later version, which served as promotion for airing, was released as the fourth single in the United States and Australia and was directed by Dutch photographer Anton Corbijn, being filmed in May 2005 in Las Vegas. The video features a surreal, dream-like sequence, where the Killers, dressed as cowboys, are attacked by scantily clad female warriors armed with boomerangs, inspired by 1965 film Faster, Pussycat! Kill! Kill! with scenes shot at the Las Vegas Neon Museum. The story in the video is told out of order, but can be put in its order by the numbers displayed in the video. The band later made use of a similar cowboy motif during promotion of their second album, Sam's Town, and its accompanying tour and music videos during 2006 and 2007.

== Accolades ==
Publication	Country	Accolade	Year	Rank
XFM	United Kingdom	100 Greatest Songs of the Decade	2009	22
Absolute Radio	United Kingdom	100 Best Songs of the Decade	2009	9
NME	United Kingdom	100 Greatest Tracks of the Decade	2009	95
NME	United Kingdom	150 Best Tracks of the Past 15 Years	2011	56
The Daily Telegraph	United Kingdom	100 Greatest Songs of All Time	2009	65
The Daily Telegraph	United Kingdom	100 Greatest Songs of All Time	2015	75
Pretty Much Amazing	United States	Favorite Songs of the Last Ten Years	2010	14
Billboard	United States	The 100 Greatest Song Bridges of the 21st Century: Staff Picks	2021	2
Billboard	United States	The 100 Best Songs of 2005: Staff Picks	2025	51

== Awards ==
Year	Ceremony	Award	Result
2006	Grammy Awards	Best Rock Performance by a Duo or Group with Vocal	Nominated
2020	Guild of Music Supervisors Awards	Best Song Written and/or Recorded for Television	Nominated

== Track listings ==
All songs were written by Brandon Flowers except where noted.

UK 7-inch single

A. "All These Things That I've Done" (album version)
B. "Andy, You're a Star" (Zane Lowe Radio 1 session)

UK CD single

1. "All These Things That I've Done" (album version)
2. "Why Don't You Find Out for Yourself" (Zane Lowe Radio 1 session) (Morrissey, Alain Whyte)
3. "All These Things That I've Done" (radio edit)
4. "All These Things That I've Done" (enhanced video)

European CD single

1. "All These Things That I've Done" (radio edit) – 3:50
2. "All These Things That I've Done" (album version) – 5:01

Australian and New Zealand CD single

1. "All These Things That I've Done" (radio edit) – 3:50
2. "All These Things That I've Done" (album version) – 5:01
3. "Mr. Brightside" (The Lindbergh Palace club remix) (Flowers, Dave Keuning) – 8:22
4. "All These Things That I've Done" (video)

== Personnel ==
Personnel are adapted from the liner notes of Hot Fuss.

The Killers

- Brandon Flowers – vocals, synthesizer
- Dave Keuning – guitar
- Mark Stoermer – bass
- Ronnie Vannucci Jr. – drums

Additional musicians

- Sweet Inspirations – gospel choir

Production

- Jeff Saltzman – production, recording
- The Killers – production
- Dave Stedronsky – engineering assistance
- Mark Needham – engineering assistance
- Will Brierre – engineering assistance
- Dario Dendi – engineering assistance
- Alan Moulder – mixing
- Brian "Big Bass" Gardner – mastering

== Charts ==
=== Weekly charts ===
Chart (2004–2006)	Peak position
Australia (ARIA)	42
Canada (Nielsen SoundScan)	52
Canada Rock Top 30 (Radio & Records)	1
Ireland (IRMA)	46
Netherlands (Single Top 100)	66
New Zealand (Recorded Music NZ)	36
Scottish Singles Sales (Official Charts)	16
Sweden (Sverigetopplistan)	35
UK Singles (Official Charts)	18
UK Indie (Official Charts)	3
US Billboard Hot 100	74
US Alternative Airplay (Billboard)	10

=== Year-end charts ===
Chart (2005)	Position
US Modern Rock Tracks (Billboard)	33

== Certifications ==
Region	Certification	Certified units/sales
Australia (ARIA)	2× Platinum	140,000^{‡}
Canada (Music Canada)	3× Platinum	240,000^{‡}
New Zealand (RMNZ)	Platinum	30,000^{‡}
United Kingdom (BPI)	Platinum	600,000^{‡}
United States (RIAA)	3× Platinum	3,000,000^{‡}
^{‡} Sales+streaming figures based on certification alone.

== Release history ==
Region	Date	Format(s)	Label(s)	Ref.
United Kingdom	August 30, 2004	CD	Lizard King	
United States	June 27, 2005	Contemporary hit; alternative radio	Island	
United States	July 11, 2005	Hot adult contemporary radio	Island	
Australia	July 18, 2005	CD	Island	

== In other media ==
- The song is mimed to by Justin Timberlake in a drug induced dream sequence in the 2006 Richard Kelly movie Southland Tales.
- The song was prominently featured in the pilot episode of the TV series Jericho, when the main character (played by Skeet Ulrich) returns to his hometown.
- The song plays over the final scene in the 2007 film The Trial of Tony Blair, as Blair, due to his involvement in the Iraq War, is transported to The Hague in a prison van.
- Comedian and musician Bill Bailey frequently pokes fun at the song's refrain during his shows, providing his own version: "I've got ham, but I'm not a hamster". According to Bailey himself, the band was aware of the parody, finding it quite amusing.
- The song has also been featured in commercials, including an ad for Nike.
- The song was featured in the credits of the 2005 film The Matador and at the end of the 2008 film Expelled: No Intelligence Allowed.
- The song is featured on Big Shiny Tunes 10.
- The song was played during Hockey Night in Canada's season ending montage after the Florida Panthers won the 2024 Stanley Cup Final.
- In the 2024 documentary The Blue Angels, the song plays over footage of the final show of the 2022 Blue Angels airshow season.
- A remixed version of the song appeared in the announcement trailer of the planned 2027 video game Clutch.
