= Somebody Told Me =

2004 single by the Killers

- UK 2004 release artwork

Single by the Killers

from the album Hot Fuss
- B-side: "Under the Gun"; "The Ballad of Michael Valentine"; "Show You How"
- Released: March 15, 2004
- Studio: The Hearse (Berkeley, California)
- Genre: Alternative rock; new wave; dance-rock; disco; indie dance
- Length: 3:17
- Label: Island; Lizard King
- Songwriters: Brandon Flowers; Dave Keuning; Mark Stoermer; Ronnie Vannucci Jr.
- Producers: Jeff Saltzman; the Killers

The Killers singles chronology
| "Mr. Brightside" (2003) | "Somebody Told Me" (2004) | "All These Things That I've Done" (2004) |

Music video
- "Somebody Told Me" on YouTube

"Somebody Told Me" is a song by American rock band the Killers. It was released as the second official single from the group's debut studio album Hot Fuss (2004), and was written by band members Brandon Flowers, Dave Keuning, Mark Stoermer and Ronnie Vannucci Jr. In an interview with Rolling Stone, Brandon Flowers said: "This is the story of trying to meet someone in a club." It is written in the key of B-flat minor.

The single peaked at number 51 on the United States Billboard Hot 100. In the United Kingdom, it charted at number 28 upon its first release in March 2004, becoming the band's first hit in the Top 40, it was then re-released in January 2005 and reached number three. In Australia, the song was ranked number four on Triple J's Hottest 100 of 2004. In 2009, it was voted at number nine in XFM's Top 100 Songs of the Decade.

== Composition ==
Stylistically, "Somebody Told Me" has been cited as alternative rock, new wave, dance-rock, disco, and indie dance. The song is in the verse-chorus form. The intro of the song is a B♭m chord, leading into the first verse, which consists of a B♭m–E♭m–B♭ chord progression repeated twice, followed by a pre-chorus of G♭–A♭–B♭m chord progression repeated twice.

The chorus follows the B♭m–G♭–A♭–F chord progression repeated twice. The first time through the chorus, the last F chord is cut off. The song has a second verse and chorus, then has a bridge with the chord progression E–G♭–B–E–B–E–A♭m–G♭–E–E♭–G♭, which leads into the chorus for a final time.

== Critical reception ==
Billboard called the song "wildly infectious", and "as addictive as nickel slots". Blender asserted that the single is a "superb blaze of synthesizers and guitars that builds to the year's best one-liner: 'Somebody told me you had a boyfriend who looked like a girlfriend I had in February of last year.'"

Entertainment Weekly hailed the single as "three smashingly punchy minutes of garage pop so tightly wound that singer Brandon Flowers seems to be accusing his girl of cheating on him with another woman." Rolling Stone said the single was a "nightclub anthem in the making" and continued, "the acid-tongued 'Somebody Told Me' blasts into outer space on a wave of synthesizers and singer Brandon Flowers' cheeky chorus."

Michael Paoletta of Billboard praised the remixes done by, respectively, Josh Harris and King Unique for "maintaining the original song's integrity" but recommended readers to buy the album, Hot Fuss, rather than the single.

In 2020, Paste ranked the song number six on their list of the 20 greatest Killers songs, and in 2021, American Songwriter ranked the song number three on their list of the 10 greatest Killers songs.

== Music video ==
The music video for "Somebody Told Me", was filmed in February 2004 in California, and was directed by Brett Simon. It shows the Killers performing their song in the moonlight of a desert location (the night scene turns to day during the ending chorus), with a giant LED screen displaying scrolling characters and flashing images of their logo, as well as an alternate version of the video shot during the day. The imagery in the video pays homage to that of "Crystal" by English alternative dance group New Order; the Killers named themselves after the fictitious band performing in the New Order video.

== Live performances ==
The band performed the song during an appearance on an episode of Saturday Night Live, hosted by Topher Grace in 2005. They also performed the song at the Sideshow Lollapalooza in June 2011.

== Accolades ==
| Publication | Country | Accolade | Year | Rank |
|---|---|---|---|---|
| Rock & Pop | Chile | Rock & Pop 20 Años 200 Canciones | 2013 | 192 |
| XFM | United Kingdom | 100 Greatest Songs of the Decade | 2009 | 9 |
| Absolute Radio | United Kingdom | 100 Best Songs of the Decade | 2009 | 60 |
| NME | United Kingdom | 100 Greatest Tracks of the Decade | 2009 | 41 |
| Triple J | Australia | Hottest 100 of 2004 | 2004 | 4 |

== Awards ==
| Year | Ceremony | Award | Result |
|---|---|---|---|
| 2005 | Grammy Awards | Best Rock Song | Nominated |
| 2005 | Grammy Awards | Best Rock Performance by a Duo or Group with Vocal | Nominated |
| 2005 | International Dance Music Awards | Best Alternative/Rock Dance Track | Nominated |

== Track listings ==
US 12-inch single (2004)

A1. "Somebody Told Me" (Josh Harris club)
A2. "Somebody Told Me" (Josh Harris dub)
B1. "Somebody Told Me" (King Unique vocal remix)
B2. "Somebody Told Me" (King Unique's Frogger dub)

UK and Australian CD single (2004)

1. "Somebody Told Me"
2. "The Ballad of Michael Valentine"
3. "Under the Gun"

UK 7-inch single and European CD single (2004)

1. "Somebody Told Me"
2. "The Ballad of Michael Valentine"

UK CD1 (2005)

1. "Somebody Told Me"
2. "Show You How"

UK CD2 (2005)

1. "Somebody Told Me"
2. "Somebody Told Me" (Mylo mix)
3. "Somebody Told Me" (King Unique vocal remix)
4. U-MYX enhanced section

UK 12-inch single (2005)

A. "Somebody Told Me" (Mylo mix)
B. "Somebody Told Me" (The Glimmers GypRock mix)

== Personnel ==
Personnel are adapted from the liner notes of Hot Fuss.

The Killers

- Brandon Flowers – vocals, synthesizer
- Dave Keuning – guitar
- Mark Stoermer – bass
- Ronnie Vannucci Jr. – drums

Production

- Jeff Saltzman – production, recording
- The Killers – production
- Dave Stedronsky – engineering assistance
- Mark Needham – engineering assistance
- Will Brierre – engineering assistance
- Dario Dendi – engineering assistance
- Alan Moulder – mixing
- Brian "Big Bass" Gardner – mastering

== Charts ==
=== Weekly charts ===
| Chart (2004–2005) | Peak position |
|---|---|
| Australia (ARIA) | 17 |
| Austria (Ö3 Austria Top 40) | 24 |
| Brazil Hot 100 Airplay (Billboard Brasil) | 76 |
| Canada (Nielsen SoundScan) | 8 |
| Canada CHR/Pop Top 30 (Radio & Records) | 11 |
| Canada Hot AC Top 30 (Radio & Records) | 13 |
| Canada Rock Top 30 (Radio & Records) | 1 |
| CIS Airplay (TopHit) | 153 |
| Denmark (Tracklisten) | 6 |
| Europe (Eurochart Hot 100) | 10 |
| France (SNEP) | 24 |
| Greece (IFPI) | 23 |
| Ireland (IRMA) | 9 |
| Italy (FIMI) | 31 |
| Netherlands (Dutch Top 40 Tipparade) | 5 |
| Netherlands (Single Top 100) | 41 |
| New Zealand (Recorded Music NZ) | 13 |
| Russia Airplay (TopHit) | 107 |
| Scottish Singles Sales (Official Charts) | 2 |
| Switzerland (Schweizer Hitparade) | 16 |
| UK Singles (Official Charts) | 3 |
| UK Indie (Official Charts) | 1 |
| UK Rock & Metal (Official Charts) | 16 |
| US Billboard Hot 100 | 51 |
| US Adult Pop Airplay (Billboard) | 17 |
| US Alternative Airplay (Billboard) | 3 |
| US Dance Singles Sales (Billboard) King Unique/J. Harris mixes | 25 |
| US Dance Airplay (Billboard) | 6 |
| US Pop Airplay (Billboard) | 24 |

=== Year-end charts ===
| Chart (2004) | Position |
|---|---|
| US Adult Top 40 (Billboard) | 61 |
| US Modern Rock Tracks (Billboard) | 16 |

| Chart (2005) | Position |
|---|---|
| Brazil Pop Charts (Crowley) | 11 |
| UK Singles (OCC) | 111 |
| US Adult Top 40 (Billboard) | 59 |
| US Hot Dance Airplay (Billboard) | 20 |

== Certifications ==
| Region | Certification | Certified units/sales |
|---|---|---|
| Australia (ARIA) | 7× Platinum | 490,000^{‡} |
| Brazil (Pro-Música Brasil) | Platinum | 60,000^{‡} |
| Canada (Music Canada) | 5× Platinum | 400,000^{‡} |
| Germany (BVMI) | Gold | 150,000^{‡} |
| Italy (FIMI) | Platinum | 100,000^{‡} |
| New Zealand (RMNZ) | 4× Platinum | 120,000^{‡} |
| Spain (Promusicae) | Platinum | 60,000^{‡} |
| United Kingdom (BPI) | 4× Platinum | 2,400,000^{‡} |
| United States (RIAA) | 5× Platinum | 5,000,000^{‡} |
^{‡} Sales+streaming figures based on certification alone.

== Release history ==
| Region | Date | Format(s) | Label(s) | Ref. |
|---|---|---|---|---|
| United Kingdom | March 15, 2004 | 7-inch vinyl; CD | Lizard King | |
| United States | May 3, 2004 | Alternative radio | Island | |
| United States | July 26, 2004 | Hot adult contemporary radio | Island | |
| United States | August 9, 2004 | Contemporary hit radio | Island | |
| United Kingdom | January 10, 2005 | CD | Lizard King | |
