= Lizard King Records =

New York- and London-based label

Lizard King Records was a London-based independent record label founded in 2002 by Martin Heath and Dominic Hardisty.

== History ==
The label signed US rock band the Killers in July 2003. In an interview with HitQuarters, Heath said "everyone in America had turned them down. They had been out for a year looking for a deal but nobody was interested." The label then released the band's first single, "Mr. Brightside", on a limited press of 500 within the UK and then on a mass scale worldwide in 2004 and 2005. They also released second singles and a debut album before they were then signed by Island Records.

Around 2006, Heath and Hardisty decided to go their separate ways. Hardisty formed a new label, Marrakesh Records.

Lizard King's distribution goes through ADA in America and Pinnacle in the UK.

== Artists ==
- ME (band)
- Clear Static
- Drive-by Argument
- Santigold (previously known as Santogold)
- The Pierces
- The Go
- The Killers
- Greater Good
- Oxzana
- Valentina Fel
- Erasmo de la Parra
