= Dave Keuning =

American guitarist (born 1976)

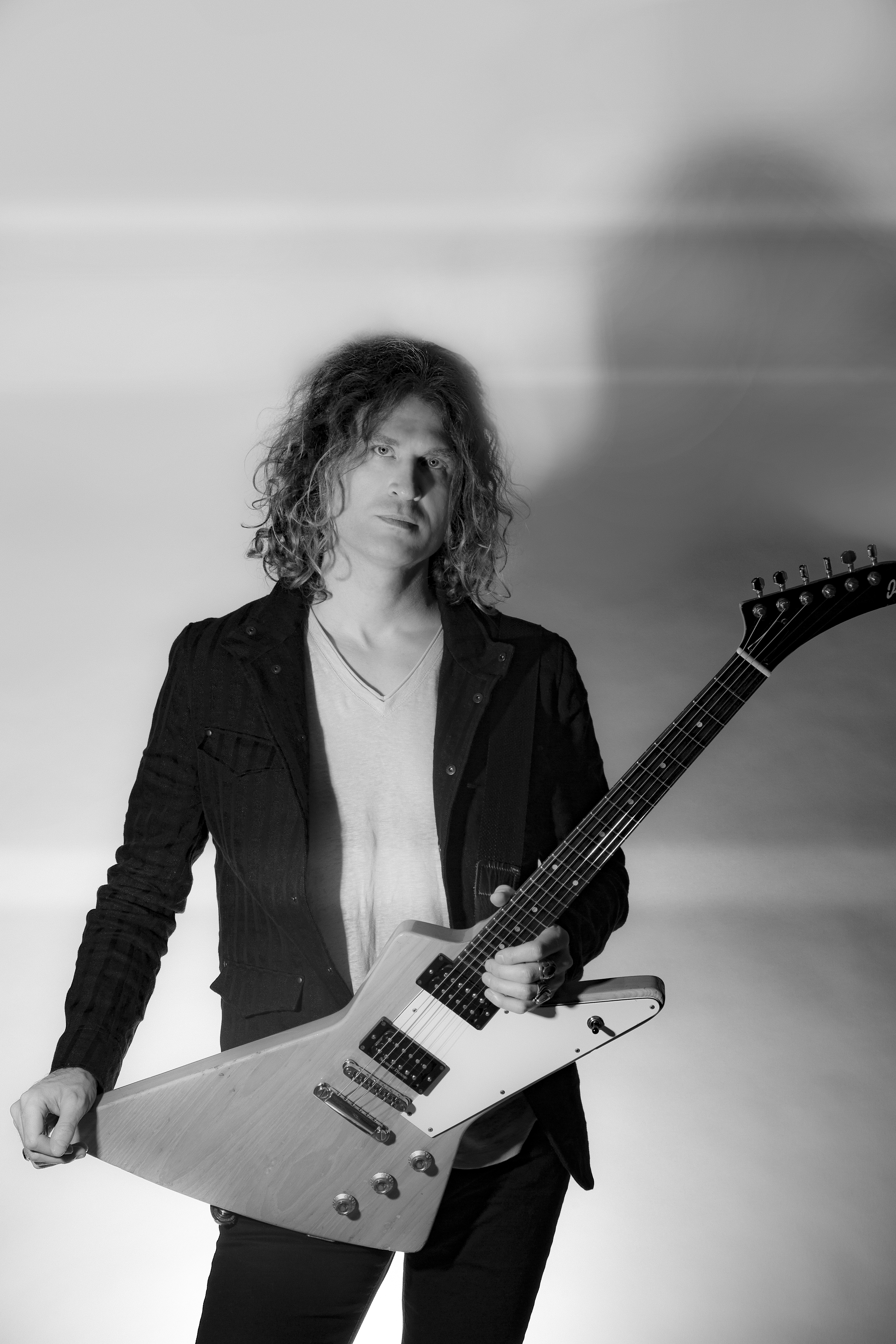
- Keuning in 2018.

Background information
- Born: David Brent Keuning; March 28, 1976 (age 50); Pella, Iowa, U.S.
- Genres: Alternative rock; blues rock; post-punk revival; new wave; heartland rock; pop rock
- Occupations: Musician; songwriter
- Instrument: Guitar
- Years active: 2001–present
- Member of: The Killers
- Website: thekillersmusic.com

David Brent Keuning (born March 28, 1976) is an American musician, best known for being the lead guitarist of the rock band the Killers, which he founded alongside frontman Brandon Flowers in 2001 and with whom he has recorded six studio albums. Keuning played every show with the Killers since its inception up until the show at Chicago's Lollapalooza in August 2017. From 2017 to the end of 2020, Keuning was on hiatus from the band. He returned to the Killers to assist in recording their 2021 album Pressure Machine. Keuning released two solo albums titled Prismism (2019) and A Mild Case of Everything (2021) under his surname Keuning.

== Personal life ==
Keuning was born and brought up in Pella, Iowa, to Charles and Sandra Keuning. His parents owned and operated a plumbing business. He has one older brother, Kevin Keuning. He started to play guitar just before entering Pella Community High School where he played in the jazz band. In his senior year the group won state champions class 3A. In 2000 Keuning moved to Las Vegas, Nevada. He found work at the Banana Republic store in The Venetian Hotel and Casino on The Strip.

Keuning married Emilie Keuning on October 20, 2018. They live in Los Angeles, California.

== Career ==
Keuning placed an ad in the local Las Vegas Weekly looking to form a band, mentioning Oasis as one of his influences. Brandon Flowers, who shared Keuning's love of groups such as New Order and the Cure, answered it, only to have Keuning promptly hand him a TASCAM-recorded four-track demo of "Mr. Brightside".

Keuning announced in August 2017 that he would not be joining the band to tour in supporting their fifth studio album, Wonderful Wonderful, although he would remain a member of the group. Keuning did not contribute to The Killers' sixth album, Imploding the Mirage, but joined the band again in studio in early 2021 to work on their seventh album, Pressure Machine and their 2023–24 greatest hits album and tour "Rebel Diamonds".

He debuted his solo music with the release of his first single "Restless Legs" under the moniker Keuning. The assemblage of new music, created by Keuning in his San Diego home studio, was taken from hundreds of voice memos that he stockpiled while on tour with the Killers over the previous decade that evolved into songs. Keuning's debut album, Prismism, was released on January 25, 2019, and is a collection of 14 tracks with almost all instruments played by Keuning himself.

== Playing style ==
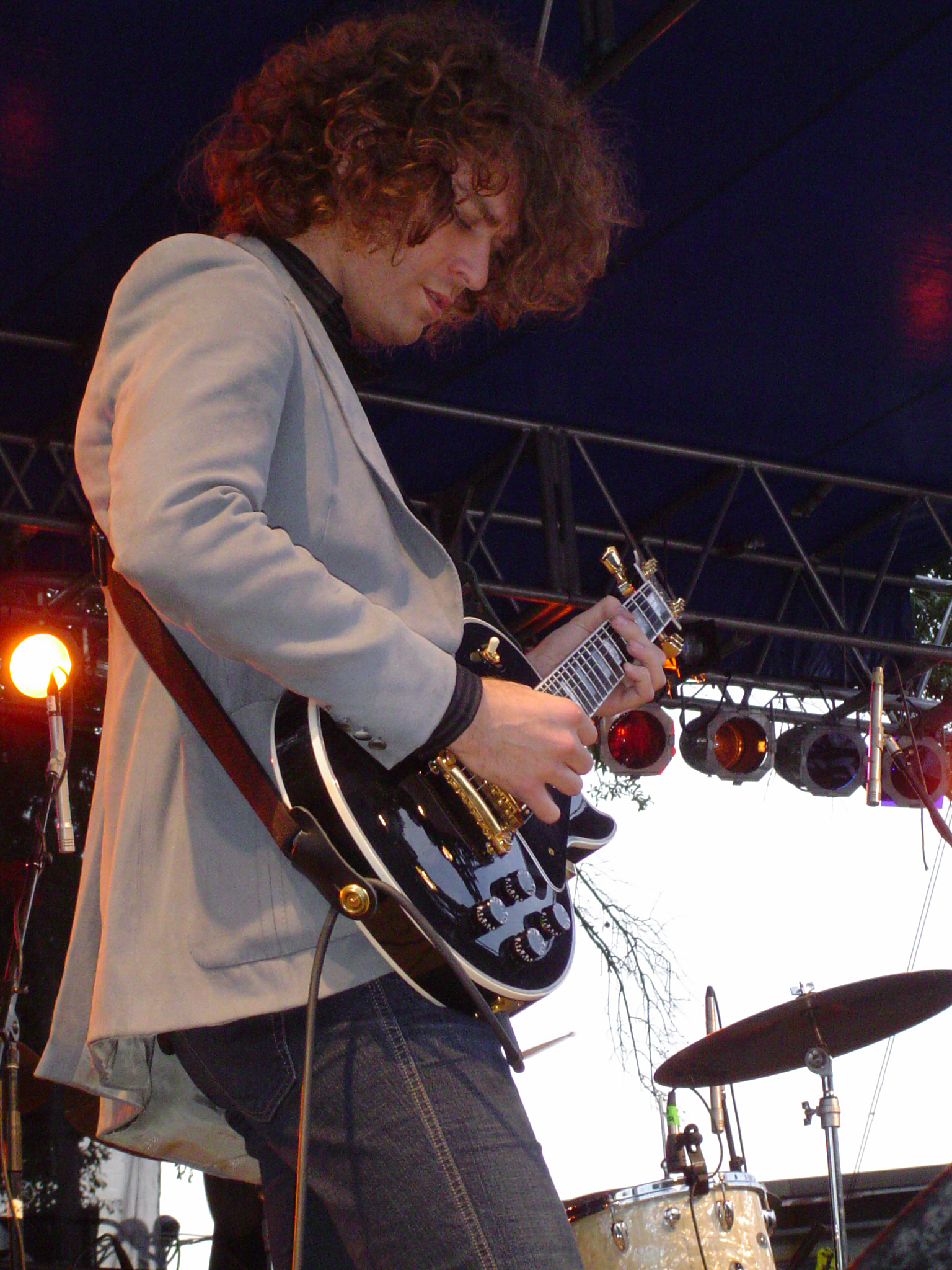
Keuning performing in 2004

Keuning is noted as a guitarist for playing anthemic and soaring solos in addition to sweetened and often percussive style playing frequently. He is also noted for his "unusual voicings" and "digit-distending, string-skipping" finger work on the guitar in similar fashion of Andy Summers of The Police.

Keuning was featured in Guitarist magazine in May 2009 and Guitar World in February 2009, Guitar Player in January 2008 and February 2010, and Guitar Aficionado in January 2013.

In 2010, Keuning's guitar riff in "Mr. Brightside" was voted at number 9 in Total Guitar's 50 greatest riffs of the 21st Century so far.

== Influences ==
Keuning's influences include rock bands such as Mötley Crüe, Aerosmith, AC/DC, Nirvana, the Smashing Pumpkins and the Cure, as well as more synth-driven acts like Duran Duran, New Order, Depeche Mode and OMD.

== Equipment ==
Guitars

- Gibson ES-335
- Fender Starcaster
- Ibanez Destroyer
- Gibson Flying V
- Gibson SG
- Gibson Les Paul Custom
- Fender Stratocaster
- Gretsch White Falcon
- Fender Jaguar
- Fender Telecaster
- Songhurst J.E.T. Doubletone
- Yamaha Revstar
- Gibson J45 Acoustic
- Ibanez AE Classical Guitar
- Gibson Explorer
- Fender Jazz Bass
- Fender Jazz Bass Fretless

Sound equipment

- Furman AR15 Voltage Regulator
- Axess Electronics FX1+ expansion board, midi foot controllers w/ Axess CFX4 control function switchers and custom made Axess Electronics Deville footswitch interfaces
- Lectrosonics Wireless Units
- Zaolla Artist and Zaolla Silverline series cables as cables and cable snakes
- (2) duplicate FX racks are wired up w/Mogami Cable

Pedals, in Voodoo Lab GCX Audio Switcher Loops:

- Keeley Mod Ibanez TS9 (phat mod and baked mod)(x2)
- Boss DD3 Digital Delay
- Boss DD6 Digital Delay
- Boss DD7 Digital Delay
- MXR Phase 100 (x2)
- MXR Phase 90
- Electro Harmonix Keeley Mod Big Muff Pi with Tone Wicker
- Electro Harmonix Green Russian Sovtek Big Muff V7C
- Ibanez AD99 Keeley Mod Delay
- Ibanez AC99 Keeley Mod Chorus
- DigiTech WH-5 Whammy V
- DigiTech Whammy DT
- TRex RoommSpate Reverb
- Buff Puff Boost
- Fishman Aura Classical Pedal (for acoustic guitars)
- Fishman Aura Dreadnought Pedal (for acoustic guitars)
- Strymon Sunset Dual Overdrive (since 2018)
- Strymon BigSky Multi-Reverb (since 2018)
- Seymour Duncan Pickup Booster (since 2018)
- Eventide ModFactor Multi-Modulation
- Retro Sonic Stereo Chorus
- Source Audio Programmable EQ
- Tone Freak Abunai 2 Overdrive
- Ernie Ball Volume
- Dunlop JP95 John Petrucci Signature CryBaby Wah Wah

Synthesizers:

- Korg MicroKORG (on Prismism)
- Yamaha PSR-6 Portatone (on Prismism)

Picks: Dunlop Nylon – 0.60mm, 0.73mm, 1.00mm

Amplifiers

- Fender Deville 2x12" (x2)
- Hiwatt DG103 Head and Hiwatt 4x12" Speaker Cabinet
- Roland JC-120 Jazz Chorus
- Matchless DC-30 (since 2015)
- Fender Bassbreaker Combo Amp
- Fender Mustang GTX100 Combo Amp

NOTE: Hiwatt currently are one of Keuning's sponsors.

== Discography ==
=== With the Killers ===
- Hot Fuss (2004)
- Sam's Town (2006)
- Day & Age (2008)
- Battle Born (2012)
- Wonderful Wonderful (2017)
- Pressure Machine (2021)

Compilations:

- Sawdust (2007)
- Direct Hits (2013)
- Don't Waste Your Wishes (2016)
- Rebel Diamonds (2023)

=== Keuning ===
- Prismism (Thirty Tigers, 2019)
- A Mild Case of Everything (Pretty Faithful Records, 2021)

Other appearances

- "Welcome to Fabulous Las Vegas" – Brandon Flowers (2010)
- "Wander" – We Are Hyena (2012)
- "This Is a Joke" (2014) – Bombay Heavy
- "Clouds Pretend" – The Hunt (2014)
- "Heavy Hand," "Goodbye Cambridge" – Blackout Balter (2016)
