= Imploding the Mirage Tour =

2021–23 concert tour by the Killers

- Tour by The Killers
- Tour poster for United Kingdom dates
- Location: Europe; North America; Oceania; South America
- Associated album: Imploding the Mirage; Pressure Machine
- Start date: August 19, 2021
- End date: December 2, 2023
- Legs: 9
- No. of shows: 63 in North America; 13 in Latin America; 37 in Europe; 12 in Oceania; 125 in total
- Supporting acts: Dawes; Blossoms; Manic Street Preachers; Sam Fender; Supergrass; Orville Peck; The Lathums; Johnny Marr; Hot Chip; Me Nd Adam; The Lemon Twigs; Ted Sablay; Joshua Ray Walker

The Killers concert chronology
- Wonderful Wonderful World Tour (2017–18); Imploding the Mirage Tour (2021–23); Rebel Diamonds Tour (2024)

The Imploding the Mirage Tour was the sixth major concert tour by American rock band The Killers. The tour supported their sixth and seventh studio albums Imploding the Mirage (2020) and Pressure Machine (2021). The tour began at the Terminal 5 in New York City on August 19, 2021, and ended at Interlagos Circuit in São Paulo on December 2, 2023.

== Background ==
=== Announcements and tour itinerary ===
The tour was initially announced in November 2019, with a series of stadium concerts in the UK and Ireland in May and June 2020. This was followed by announcements for multiple festival and arena shows across Europe in summer 2020. However, in April 2020, the band were forced to postpone the shows due to the COVID-19 pandemic, rescheduling them to summer 2021. Further pandemic restrictions forced the band to postpone the shows again in March 2021, moving them to summer 2022.

Following the announcement of the band's seventh studio album, Pressure Machine, in July 2021, the band also added a number of dates across North America between August and October 2022 to the tour. The tour began with a series of warm-up shows in the United States between August and December 2021, which also coincided with the release of Pressure Machine.

In November 2021, the band further extended the tour by announcing dates in Mexico in April 2022, and in Australia and New Zealand in November and December 2022.

In February 2022, the band announced that the tour would begin with three intimate shows at Las Vegas' Cosmopolitan Hotel in April 2022. This preceded the tour's first stadium shows in Mexico in April and May. The tour then continued on to the UK and Ireland in May and June 2022, and in April the band announced that the UK tour would begin with an intimate warm-up show at the O2 Academy Sheffield. The tour then continued on throughout Europe and to North America during the summer of 2022.

In August and September, the band announced a further leg of the tour into South America in November 2022, with shows in Colombia, Chile and Brazil. This was followed by their previously announced tour of Australia and New Zealand in November and December 2022.

In December 2022, the band confirmed that the tour would continue into 2023. This began with the a series of shows in the United States throughout the year, followed by the announcement that the band would tour the UK and Ireland again in August and September 2023, most notably with headline slots at the Reading and Leeds Festivals.

In July 2023, the band announced that the tour would end with a headline slot at Primavera Sound in São Paulo in December.

=== Highlights ===
At the first of two shows at London's Emirates Stadium on June 3, 2022, the band debuted the title track from their 2021 album Pressure Machine following a request from BBC Radio 2 DJ Jo Whiley, who was in attendance that night. Before performing the track, Flowers said, "Jo Whiley, she’s always championed us since the very beginning – she’s here tonight. She should have a jubilee, right? She said some wonderful things about this next song and she requested it tonight – if you don’t like it blame her. It’s called ‘Pressure Machine’." Whiley later said on Twitter that this was a "life highlight".

The band's show in Manchester on June 11, 2022 attracted headlines after 67-year-old Doug James crowd-surfed to the front of the audience during the show and injured his head. Frontman Brandon Flowers embraced James after he was carried over the security barriers, and James later said it was “like his childhood [was] coming back” and it brought him “so much joy”.

At their headline set at the Mad Cool Festival in Madrid in on July 7, 2022, the band debuted new track "boy" for the first time. Flowers introduced the new song by asking the crowd, "Do you wanna be the first to hear us play a new song right now? It goes like this." A studio version of "boy" was later released on August 5.

The following August, the band released another new single, "Your Side of Town", on August 25, 2023, on the weekend that they headlined Reading and Leeds Festivals. The song was debuted live the next day at Reading, on August 26.

In November 2023, "boy" and "Your Side of Town" were confirmed to be included on the band's second greatest hits album, Rebel Diamonds. The third new track from Rebel Diamonds, "Spirit", was debuted live in São Paulo on November 30, the week before the song (and album) was released.

=== Controversies ===
On August 15, 2023, the band apologized after inviting an audience member from Russia to perform on drums for "For Reasons Unknown" during their concert in Batumi in Georgia, the band's first ever show in the country. After inviting the audience member on stage, frontman Brandon Flowers asked the crowd, "We don't know the etiquette of this land but this guy's a Russian. You OK with a Russian coming up here?", which was greeted with a mix of boos and cheers. Flowers later responded to crowd discontent by asking, "You can't recognize if someone's your brother? He's not your brother?", which led to further booing and a small percentage of fans walking out of the arena in protest. The band later issued an apology on their social media pages, stating "it was never our intention to offend anyone" and recognizing that Flowers' comments "could be misconstrued".

== Critical reception ==
The tour received widespread acclaim from music critics.

Reviewing their second performance at the Emirates Stadium in London in 2022, Thomas Smith of NME awarded the band four stars, commenting that they strike the balance between "humble and grateful; bombastic and flashy" and that frontman Brandon Flowers has "Jagger-level bundles of energy and a similar magnetism". Smith particularly praised the additions to the set list from the Imploding the Mirage album. Jenessa Williams of The Guardian also gave the band four stars for their intimate warm-up show at the O2 Academy in Sheffield prior to the start of the UK and Ireland leg of the tour in 2022, noting that the band overcame issues with the venue's sound system and consequently that "tonight’s cage might not have been as grand as the Killers are used to, but with 20 years of practice and the crowd on their side, they’re still coming out of it with style".

These sentiments were echoed in reviews of the band's headline set at the 2023 Reading and Leeds Festivals. NME's Andrew Trendell called "Mr. Brightside" "a fitting showstopper of showmanship to a set that could run as a Vegas residency for the rest of time" in his four-star review of the performance. The i newspaper's Ali Shutler awarded the same number of stars in his review, remarking that "The Killers’ music remains universal and timeless" and praising the band's balance between "a sense of nostalgia" and "fresh-faced excitement".

== Set list ==
This set list is representative of the show on May 24, 2022 in Doncaster. It is not intended to represent all shows from the tour.

1. "My Own Soul's Warning"
2. "Enterlude"
3. "When You Were Young"
4. "Jenny Was a Friend of Mine"
5. "Smile Like You Mean It"
6. "Shot at the Night"
7. "Blowback"
8. "Running Towards a Place"
9. "Mr. Brightside"
10. "Somebody Told Me"
11. "Fire in Bone"
12. "Shadowplay"
13. "Run for Cover"
14. "Runaway Horses"
15. "A Dustland Fairytale"
16. "The First Time Ever I Saw Your Face"
17. "Runaways"
18. "Read My Mind"
19. "Dying Breed
20. "Caution" (with "Rut Segue intro")

Encore

21. "Spaceman"
22. "Human"
23. "Midnight Show"
24. "All These Things That I've Done"

=== Special guests ===
- Alex Moore performed The Lathums' "How Beautiful Life Can Be" with the band during the concert on July 12, 2022 in Vienna, and again on July 16 in Amsterdam.
- Johnny Marr performed The Smiths' "There Is A Light That Never Goes Out", "Stop Me If You Think You’ve Heard This One Before", "What She Said", "Please, Please, Please, Let Me Get What I Want", "This Charming Man" and "You Just Haven't Earned It Yet, Baby", as well as The Killers' "Mr. Brightside", frequently during the encore of the band's 2022 North American tour (where Marr also served as the band's opening act). Marr returned to play "This Charming Man" and "When You Were Young" with the band on August 29, 2023 in Edinburgh.
- Lindsey Buckingham performed Fleetwood Mac's "Go Your Own Way" and The Killers' "Caution" and "Mr. Brightside" with the band during the concert on August 27, 2022 in Los Angeles.
- Bruce Springsteen performed "Born to Run" and "Badlands" and The Killers' "A Dustland Fairytale" with the band during the concert on October 2, 2022 in New York City.
- Mike Scott performed The Waterboys' "The Whole of the Moon" with the band during their headline performance at the Electric Picnic Festival on September 3, 2023.

=== Midnight show ===
This set list is representative of the show on November 21, 2022 at Auckland Town Hall. It is not intended to represent all shows from the tour.

1. "Midnight Show"
2. "Shadowplay" (Joy Division cover)
3. "Human"
4. "Bling (Confession of a King)"
5. "Cody"
6. "Pressure Machine"
7. "This River Is Wild"
8. "Bones"
9. "The Way It Was"
10. "Run for Cover"
11. "From Here on Out"
12. "Mr. Brightside"
13. "When You Were Young"

== Tour dates ==
List of concerts, showing date, city, country, venue, opening act, attendance, and gross revenue
Date	City	Country	Venue	Opening act(s)	Attendance	Revenue
Leg 1 — Warm-up shows
August 19, 2021 (Note: This show was a warm-up concert.)	New York City	United States	Terminal 5	—N/a	—N/a	—N/a
September 20, 2021	Newport	United States	PromoWest Pavilion at Ovation	—N/a	—N/a	—N/a
September 21, 2021	Bethlehem	United States	Wind Creek Event Center	—N/a	—N/a	—N/a
September 22, 2021	Philadelphia	United States	Franklin Music Hall	—N/a	—N/a	—N/a
September 24, 2021 (Note: The September 24, 2021 show was part of Firefly Music Festival.)	Dover	United States	Dover Motor Speedway	—N/a	—N/a	—N/a
December 7, 2021	Chicago	United States	Aragon Ballroom	Girl in Red; The Backseat Lovers	—N/a	—N/a
Leg 2 — North America
April 15, 2022	Las Vegas	United States	The Chelsea Bellroom	—N/a	—N/a	—N/a
April 16, 2022	Las Vegas	United States	The Chelsea Bellroom	—N/a	—N/a	—N/a
April 17, 2022	Las Vegas	United States	The Chelsea Bellroom	—N/a	—N/a	—N/a
April 26, 2022	Monterrey	Mexico	Arena Monterrey	Dawes	28,000 / 28,000	$1,341,987
April 27, 2022	Monterrey	Mexico	Arena Monterrey	Dawes	28,000 / 28,000	$1,341,987
April 29, 2022	Mexico City	Mexico	Foro Sol	Dawes	64,511 / 64,511	$3,609,174
May 1, 2022	Zapopan	Mexico	Estadio Tres de Marzo	Dawes	26,293 / 26,293	$1,876,660
Leg 3 — Europe
May 17, 2022	Sheffield	England	O_{2} Academy Sheffield	—N/a	—N/a	—N/a
May 24, 2022	Doncaster	England	Eco-Power Stadium	Blossoms	22,785 / 22,785	$2,048,923
May 26, 2022	Bristol	England	Ashton Gate Stadium	Manic Street Preachers	31,191 / 31,191	$2,925,349
May 28, 2022	Coventry	England	Coventry Building Society Arena	Manic Street Preachers	35,116 / 37,340	$3,050,248
May 30, 2022	Southampton	England	St Mary's Stadium	Blossoms	31,149 / 31,149	$2,752,912
June 1, 2022	Middlesbrough	England	Riverside Stadium	Manic Street Preachers	30,090 / 30,090	$2,635,898
June 3, 2022	London	England	Emirates Stadium	Sam Fender	111,230 / 111,230	$10,911,412
June 4, 2022	London	England	Emirates Stadium	Sam Fender	111,230 / 111,230	$10,911,412
June 6, 2022	Falkirk	Scotland	Falkirk Stadium	Blossoms	51,066 / 51,950	$4,594,931
June 7, 2022	Falkirk	Scotland	Falkirk Stadium	Supergrass	51,066 / 51,950	$4,594,931
June 9, 2022	Norwich	England	Carrow Road	Blossoms	25,236 / 25,236	$2,278,661
June 11, 2022	Manchester	England	Emirates Old Trafford	Blossoms	50,000 / 50,000	$4,248,038
June 14, 2022	Malahide	Ireland	Malahide Castle	Blossoms	49,779 / 49,779	$3,624,422
June 15, 2022	Malahide	Ireland	Malahide Castle	Blossoms	49,779 / 49,779	$3,624,422
June 17, 2022 (Note: The concert in Scheeßel on June 17, 2022 was part of the Hurricane Festival.)	Scheeßel	Germany	Eichenring	—N/a	—N/a	—N/a
June 18, 2022 (Note: The concert in Neuhausen ob Eck on June 18, 2022 was part of the Southside Festival.)	Neuhausen ob Eck	Germany	Neuhausen ob Eck Airfield	—N/a	—N/a	—N/a
June 20, 2022 (Note: The concert in Zagreb on June 20, 2022 was part of the InMusic Festival.)	Zagreb	Croatia	Lake Jarun	—N/a	—N/a	—N/a
June 21, 2022 (Note: The concert in Milan on June 21, 2022 was part of the Milano Summer Festival.)	Milan	Italy	Hippodromo de San Siro	—N/a	—N/a	—N/a
June 22, 2022 (Note: The concert in Sopron on June 22, 2022 was part of the Volt Festival.)	Sopron	Hungary	Volt Festival Grounds	—N/a	—N/a	—N/a
July 2, 2022 (Note: The concert in Gdynia on July 2, 2022 was part of the Open'er Festival.)	Gdynia	Poland	Gdynia-Kosakowo Airport	—N/a	—N/a	—N/a
July 3, 2022 (Note: The concert in Werchter on July 3, 2022 was part of Rock Werchter.)	Werchter	Belgium	Werchter Festivalpark	—N/a	—N/a	—N/a
July 5, 2022	Paris	France	Grande Seine	Orville Peck	—N/a	—N/a
July 7, 2022 (Note: The concert in Madrid on July 7, 2022 was part of the Mad Cool Festival.)	Madrid	Spain	Caja Mágica	—N/a	—N/a	—N/a
July 8, 2022 (Note: The concert in Bilbao on July 8, 2022 was part of Bilbao BBK Live.)	Bilbao	Spain	Kobetamendi	—N/a	—N/a	—N/a
July 10, 2022 (Note: The concert in Esch-sur-Alzette on July 10, 2022 was part of the Open Air Belval.)	Esch-sur-Alzette	Luxembourg	Rockhal	—N/a	—N/a	—N/a
July 12, 2022	Vienna	Austria	Wiener Stadthalle	The Lathums	9,766 / 10,744	$578,384
July 14, 2022 (Note: The concert in Ostrava on July 14, 2022 was part of Colours of Ostrava.)	Ostrava	Czech Republic	Lower Vítkovice	—N/a	—N/a	—N/a
July 16, 2022	Amsterdam	Netherlands	Ziggo Dome	The Lathums	10,196 / 10,196	$602,909
Leg 4 — North America
August 19, 2022	Vancouver	Canada	Rogers Arena	Johnny Marr	11,231 / 11,322	$695,087
August 20, 2022	Seattle	United States	Climate Pledge Arena	Johnny Marr	13,968 / 14,086	$915,737
August 21, 2022	Portland	United States	Moda Center	Johnny Marr	11,689 / 11,689	$739,480
August 23, 2022	San Francisco	United States	Chase Center	Johnny Marr	12,204 / 12,204	$1,155,687
August 24, 2022	San Diego	United States	Pechanga Arena	Johnny Marr	10,289 / 11,036	$650,784
August 26, 2022	Las Vegas	United States	T-Mobile Arena	Johnny Marr	15,139 / 15,453	$1,254,680
August 27, 2022	Los Angeles	United States	Banc of California Stadium	Johnny Marr	23,439 / 23,439	$2,068,055
August 28, 2022	Glendale	United States	Gila River Arena	Johnny Marr	12,870 / 13,160	$629,255
August 30, 2022	Salt Lake City	United States	Vivint Arena	Johnny Marr	9,780 / 10,368	$747,177
August 31, 2022	Denver	United States	Ball Arena	Johnny Marr	11,168 / 11,397	$879,854
September 9, 2022	Austin	United States	Moody Center	Johnny Marr	10,828 / 10,828	$880,630
September 10, 2022	Fort Worth	United States	Dickies Arena	Johnny Marr	12,964 / 13,225	$737,731
September 13, 2022	Miami	United States	FTX Arena	Johnny Marr	11,694 / 11,694	$835,336
September 14, 2022	Orlando	United States	Amway Center	Johnny Marr	11,316 / 12,037	$589,336
September 16, 2022	Atlanta	United States	State Farm Arena	Johnny Marr	10,061 / 10,061	$670,989
September 17, 2022	Nashville	United States	Bridgestone Arena	Johnny Marr	14,413 / 14,607	$775,784
September 20, 2022	Saint Paul	United States	Xcel Energy Center	Johnny Marr	10,306 / 11,107	$659,002
September 21, 2022	Chicago	United States	United Center	Johnny Marr	13,690 / 13,690	$1,075,009
September 23, 2022	Toronto	Canada	Scotiabank Arena	Johnny Marr	13,827 / 13,827	$905,524
September 24, 2022	Montreal	Canada	Bell Centre	Johnny Marr	11,374 / 11,374	$631,181
September 26, 2022	Verona	United States	Turning Stone Event Center	Johnny Marr	4,318 / 4,706	$355,800
September 27, 2022	Philadelphia	United States	Wells Fargo Center	Johnny Marr	12,455 / 12,455	$833,158
September 30, 2022	New York City	United States	Madison Square Garden	Johnny Marr	26,206 / 26,206	$1,813,218
October 1, 2022	New York City	United States	Madison Square Garden	Johnny Marr	26,206 / 26,206	$1,813,218
October 3, 2022	Boston	United States	TD Garden	Johnny Marr	12,582 / 12,582	$1,048,683
October 4, 2022	University Park	United States	Bryce Jordan Center	Johnny Marr	8,662 / 9,298	$596,756
October 7, 2022	Cleveland	United States	Wolstein Center	Johnny Marr	11,022 / 11, 130	$793,407
October 8, 2022	Detroit	United States	Little Caesars Arena	Johnny Marr	14,334 / 14,334	$804,602
October 10, 2022	Washington, D.C.	United States	Capital One Arena	Johnny Marr	14,013 / 14,013	$851,458
October 12, 2022	Washington, D.C.	United States	The Anthem	Johnny Marr	6,000 / 6,000	$851,458
Leg 5 — South America
November 8, 2022	Bogotá	Colombia	Coliseo Live	Hot Chip	12,441 / 12,441	$842,131
November 10, 2022 (Note: The concert in Santiago on November 10, 2022, is part of the Rockout Festival.)	Santiago	Chile	Estadio Santa Laura	—N/a	—N/a	—N/a
November 12, 2022 (Note: The concert in São Paulo on November 12, 2022, is part of the GP Week.)	São Paulo	Brazil	Allianz Parque	—N/a	—N/a	—N/a
November 14, 2022	Brasília	Brazil	Arena BRB Mané Garrincha	Capital Inicial; Raimundos; Jovem Dionisio	—N/a	—N/a
Leg 6 — Oceania
November 21, 2022	Auckland	New Zealand	Spark Arena	Jack Ladder	11,380 / 11,380	$921,320
November 22, 2022 (Note: This show, while billed for November 21, began at 12:40 am on November 22.)	Auckland	New Zealand	Auckland Town Hall	—N/a	1,000 / 1,000	—N/a
November 25, 2022	Christchurch	New Zealand	Christchurch Arena	Jack Ladder	8,120 / 8,120	$725,779
November 29, 2022	Brisbane	Australia	Brisbane Entertainment Centre	Alex Cameron	21,863 / 22,191	$2,049,085
November 30, 2022	Brisbane	Australia	Brisbane Entertainment Centre	Alex Cameron	21,863 / 22,191	$2,049,085
December 3, 2022 (Note: The concert in Geelong on December 10, 2022, is part of A Day on the Green.)	Tanunda	Australia	Peter Lehmann Wines	Jack Ladder	7,893 / 7,893	$728,840
December 4, 2022	Adelaide	Australia	Adelaide 500	—N/a	—N/a	—N/a
December 6, 2022	Perth	Australia	RAC Arena	Alex Cameron	14,626 / 14,626	$1,409,580
December 10, 2022 (Note: The concert in Geelong on December 10, 2022, is part of A Day on the Green.)	Geelong	Australia	Mount Dundeed Estate	Jack Ladder Alex Cameron	20,000 / 20,000	$1,967,667
December 13, 2022	Melbourne	Australia	Rod Laver Arena	Alex Cameron	21,619 / 22,733	$2,330,757
December 14, 2022	Melbourne	Australia	Rod Laver Arena	Alex Cameron	21,619 / 22,733	$2,330,757
December 17, 2022	Pokolbin	Australia	Hope Estate	Jack Ladder Alex Cameron	19,079 / 19,079	$1,839,059
December 19, 2022	Sydney	Australia	Qudos Bank Arena	Alex Cameron	15,513 / 16,316	$1,464,272
Leg 7 — North America
December 31, 2022	Las Vegas	United States	The Cosmopolitan of Las Vegas	Me Nd Adam	—N/a	—N/a
March 16, 2023	Atlantic City	United States	Hard Rock Live at Etess Arena	The Lemon Twigs	—N/a	—N/a
March 17, 2023	Uncasville	United States	Mohegan Sun Arena	The Lemon Twigs	6,684 / 6,684	$774,265
March 19, 2023 (Note: Was originally scheduled for October 6, 2022 but was delayed till March 19, 2023.)	Pittsburgh	United States	Petersen Events Center	The Lemon Twigs; Ted Sablay	—N/a	—N/a
March 21, 2023	Columbus	United States	Schottenstein Center	The Lemon Twigs; Ted Sablay	—N/a	—N/a
March 22, 2023 (Note: Was originally scheduled for September 18, 2022 but was delayed till March 22, 2023.)	St. Louis	United States	Chaifetz Arena	The Lemon Twigs; Ted Sablay	—N/a	—N/a
March 24, 2023	Durant	United States	Choctaw Grand Theater	The Lemon Twigs; Ted Sablay	—N/a	—N/a
March 30, 2023	Tlajomulco de Zuñiga	Mexico	Arena VFG	—N/a	—N/a	—N/a
April 1, 2023	Mexico City	Mexico	Palacio de los Deportes	—N/a	—N/a	—N/a
April 2, 2023 (Note: The concert in Monterrey on April 2, 2023 is part of Pal Norte.)	Monterrey	Mexico	Parque Fundidora	—N/a	—N/a	—N/a
May 5, 2023 (Note: The May 5, 2023 show was part of Shaky Knees Music Festival.)	Atlanta	United States	Central Park	—N/a	—N/a	—N/a
May 7, 2023 (Note: The May 7, 2023 show was part of Sunfest.)	West Palm Beach	United States	West Palm Beach	—N/a	—N/a	—N/a
May 8, 2023	St. Augustine	United States	St. Augustine Amphitheatre	—N/a	—N/a	—N/a
May 11, 2023	Gary	United States	Hard Rock Casino Northern Indiana	—N/a	—N/a	—N/a
May 12, 2023 (Note: The May 12, 2023 show will be the first show performing at Steelhouse Omaha.)	Omaha	United States	Steelhouse Omaha	—N/a	—N/a	—N/a
May 14, 2023 (Note: Was originally scheduled for September 8, 2022, delayed till March 25, 2023, then delayed one more time for May 14, 2023. Free posters were given away as a thank you to the fans for waiting.)	Houston	United States	Toyota Center	The Lemon Twigs	—N/a	—N/a
July 13, 2023	Minneapolis	United States	First Avenue	—N/a	—N/a	—N/a
July 14, 2023 (Note: The July 14, 2023 show was part of TC Summer Fest.)	Minneapolis	United States	Target Field	—N/a	—N/a	—N/a
Leg 8 — Europe
August 15, 2023	Shekvetili	Georgia	Black Sea Arena	—N/a	—N/a	—N/a
August 18, 2023 (Note: The August 18, 2023 show was part of Lovestream Festival.)	Bratislava	Slovakia	Vajnory Airport	—N/a	—N/a	—N/a
August 20, 2023 (Note: The August 20, 2023 show was part of Pukkelpop.)	Hasselt	Belgium	Kempische Steenweg	—N/a	—N/a	—N/a
August 23, 2023 (Note: The August 23, 2023 show was part of Zurich Open Air.)	Zurich	Switzerland	Festivalgelände Glattbrugg	—N/a	—N/a	—N/a
August 26, 2023 (Note: The August 26, 2023 show was part of Reading Festival.)	Reading	England	Little John's Farm	—N/a	—N/a	—N/a
August 27, 2023 (Note: The August 27, 2023 show was part of Leeds Festival.)	Leeds	England	Bramham Park	—N/a	—N/a	—N/a
August 29, 2023	Edinburgh	Scotland	Royal Highland Centre	Johnny Marr	—N/a	—N/a
September 1, 2023	Belfast	Northern Ireland	Boucher Road Playing Fields	Johnny Marr	—N/a	—N/a
September 3, 2023 (Note: The September 3, 2023 show was part of Electric Picnic.)	County Laois	Ireland	Stradbally Hall	—N/a	—N/a	—N/a
Leg 9 — North America
September 15, 2023 (Note: The September 15, 2023 show was part of Bourbon and Beyond Festival.)	Louisville	United States	Kentucky Expo Center	—N/a	—N/a	—N/a
September 16, 2023 (Note: The September 16, 2023 show was part of Sea.Hear.Now Festival.)	Asbury Park	United States	Asbury Park Waterfront	—N/a	—N/a	—N/a
September 18, 2023	Reno	United States	Grand Sierra Resort	Joshua Ray Walker	—N/a	—N/a
September 19, 2023	Reno	United States	Grand Sierra Resort	Joshua Ray Walker	—N/a	—N/a
September 21, 2023	Highland	United States	Yaamava' Resort & Casino	—N/a	—N/a	—N/a
September 22, 2023 (Note: The September 22, 2023 show was part of Life is Beautiful Festival.)	Las Vegas	United States	Downtown Las Vegas	—N/a	—N/a	—N/a
September 27, 2023	Wheatland	United States	Hard Rock Hotel & Casino Sacramento	—N/a	—N/a	—N/a
September 29, 2023 (Note: The September 29, 2023 show was part of Ohana Festival.)	Dana Point	United States	Doheny State Beach	—N/a	—N/a	—N/a
October 18, 2023	Austin	United States	Emo's	—N/a	—N/a	—N/a
October 20, 2023 (Note: The October 20, 2023 show was part of the 2023 Formula One World Championship.)	Austin	United States	Circuit of the Americas	—N/a	—N/a	—N/a
Leg 10 — South America
November 30, 2023	São Paulo	Brazil	Tokio Marine Hall	—N/a	—N/a	—N/a
December 2, 2023 (Note: The December 2, 2023 show was part of the Primavera Sound Festival in Sāo Paulo.)	São Paulo	Brazil	Interlagos Circuit	—N/a	—N/a	—N/a

== Cancelled shows ==
List of cancelled concerts showing date, city, country, venue and reason for cancellation
Date	City	Country	Venue	Reason	Ref.
August 21, 2021	New York City	United States	Great Lawn of Central Park	Hurricane Henri	
September 30, 2021	Augusta-Richmond County	United States	William B. Bell Auditorium	COVID-19	
July 1, 2022	Stockholm	Sweden	Ladugardsgardet	Aircraft mechanical problem	
July 17, 2022 (Note: The cancelled show would have been part of Park Live Festival.)	Moscow	Russia	Luzhniki Olympic Complex	Russian invasion of Ukraine	

== Personnel ==
Credits adapted from LasVegasRoundTheClock and Consequence of Sound

=== The Killers ===
- Brandon Flowers - lead vocals, keyboards, piano, bass on "For Reasons Unknown"
- Dave Keuning - lead guitar, backing vocals (did not appear on May 17 - June 22, 2022, returned to the tour on July 2, 2022 in Gdynia, Poland, absent in 2023 dates)
- Ronnie Vannucci Jr. - drums, percussion, rhythm guitar on "For Reasons Unknown" (audience member on drums)

=== Additional musicians ===
- Ted Sablay - keyboards, rhythm guitar, lead guitar (May 17 - June 22, 2022 and 2023 dates), musical director, backing vocals
- Jake Blanton - bass, backing vocals
- Taylor Milne - rhythm guitar, keyboards, backing vocals
- Robbie Connolly - keyboards, rhythm guitar, backing vocals
- Erica Canales - background vocals
- Melissa Mcmillan - background vocals
- Tori Allen - background vocals, violin, acoustic guitar
