= Rebel Diamonds =

Greatest hits album by the Killers
- Released: December 8, 2023
- Recorded: 2001–2023
- Studios: Cornerstone (Los Angeles, California); Kill the Messenger (Henderson, Nevada); The Hearse (Berkeley, California); 11th Street Records (Las Vegas, Nevada); The Garage (Topanga, California); Battle Born (Las Vegas, Nevada); The Phantasy Sound (London); Subtle McNugget (Los Angeles); Electro-Vox (Los Angeles)
- Length: 80:50
- Label: Island
- Producers: Flood; the Killers; Steve Lillywhite; Alan Moulder; Brendan O'Brien; Stuart Price; Jeff Saltzman; Jonathan Rado; Shawn Everett

The Killers chronology
Pressure Machine (2021)	Rebel Diamonds (2023)	Encore at the Garden (2025)

Singles from Rebel Diamonds
- 1. "Boy" Released: August 5, 2022; 2. "Your Side of Town" Released: August 25, 2023

Rebel Diamonds is a greatest hits album by American rock band the Killers, released on December 8, 2023, through Island Records. It is the band's second greatest hits collection, following Direct Hits in 2013.

The compilation features three original songs from the band's aborted eighth studio album – "Boy", "Your Side of Town" and "Spirit" – produced by Stuart Price and Shawn Everett.

== Background ==
On August 5, 2022, the band released "Boy", their first new song following 2021's Pressure Machine. "Boy" was written during the recording sessions for Pressure Machine and was described by the band as a "catalyst" for the album, but was left off the final album as the band felt it did not fit the album's overall genre. Consequently, they intended for it to be the first single from their planned eighth studio album, which was to be a "more electro-leaning record" and to be produced during the Imploding the Mirage Tour.

However, by the time their second single "Your Side of Town" was released on August 25, 2023, the band had scrapped this planned eighth album, instead suggesting that the two new singles would be included on an EP, which was later also scrapped.

Instead, on November 7, 2023, the band announced that they were to release their second greatest hits album, Rebel Diamonds, to mark twenty years since their debut album, Hot Fuss (2004). This serves as a retrospective look at the career of the rock band, featuring a chronological arrangement of twenty of their hits by the year of release, including at least one track from each album, alongside the two previously released standalone singles, "Boy" and "Your Side of Town", and a new track, "Spirit".

The album title is taken from the lyrics of their song "Read My Mind" from their second album, Sam's Town, which features the line, "the stars are blazing like rebel diamonds, cut out of the sun".

== Promotion ==
"Boy" debuted live on July 7, 2022, at the Mad Cool Festival in Madrid, and was subsequently a regular fixture of set lists during the Imploding the Mirage Tour. "Your Side of Town" was given a similar festival debut, at Reading Festival on August 26, 2023. Finally, "Spirit" was first performed live the week before the release of Rebel Diamonds, in São Paulo on November 30.

The release of the album was accompanied by the band's seventh major concert tour, the Rebel Diamonds Tour. This featured a number of arena shows in the UK and Ireland and North America, as well as festival headliner spots in Japan and Spain, between June and October 2024. The tour was announced the week before the release of the album with a four-city UK and Ireland tour, with the international dates announced later.

== Commercial performance ==
Rebel Diamonds debuted at number one on the UK Albums Chart, becoming the band's eighth number-one album with first-week sales of 25,360 copies. This tied them with R.E.M. as the US group with the most UK number-one albums.

== Track listing ==
Rebel Diamonds track listing
No.	Title	Writer(s)	Producer(s)	Length
1.	"Jenny Was a Friend of Mine" (from Hot Fuss, 2004)	Brandon Flowers; Mark Stoermer	Jeff Saltzman; the Killers	4:03
2.	"Mr. Brightside" (from Hot Fuss)	Flowers; Dave Keuning	Saltzman; the Killers	3:43
3.	"All These Things That I've Done" (from Hot Fuss)	Flowers	Saltzman; the Killers	5:01
4.	"Somebody Told Me" (from Hot Fuss)	Flowers; Keuning; Stoermer; Ronnie Vannucci Jr.	Saltzman; the Killers	3:18
5.	"When You Were Young" (from Sam's Town, 2006)	Flowers; Keuning; Stoermer; Vannucci	Flood; Alan Moulder; the Killers	3:37
6.	"Read My Mind" (from Sam's Town)	Flowers; Keuning; Stoermer	Flood; Moulder; the Killers	4:03
7.	"Human" (from Day & Age, 2008)	Flowers; Keuning; Stoermer; Vannucci	Stuart Price; the Killers	4:08
8.	"Spaceman" (from Day & Age)	Flowers; Keuning; Stoermer; Vannucci	Price; the Killers	4:44
9.	"A Dustland Fairytale" (from Day & Age)	Flowers; Keuning; Stoermer; Vannucci	Price; the Killers	3:45
10.	"Be Still" (from Battle Born, 2012)	Flowers; Daniel Lanois	Damian Taylor	4:33
11.	"Runaways" (from Battle Born)	Flowers	Brendan O'Brien; Steve Lillywhite^{[a]}; Taylor^{[a]}	4:04
12.	"The Man" (from Wonderful Wonderful, 2017)	Flowers; Stoermer; Vannucci; Jacknife Lee; Robert Bell; Ronald Bell; Don Boyce; George Brown; Robert Mickens; Otha Nash; Claydes Smith; Dennis Thomas; Richard Westfield	Lee; Erol Alkan^{[a]}; Jimmy Robertson^{[b]}	4:08
13.	"Caution" (from Imploding the Mirage, 2020)	Flowers; Stoermer; Vannucci; Cameron; Everett; Rado	Jonathan Rado; Shawn Everett	4:29
14.	"My Own Soul's Warning" (from Imploding the Mirage)	Flowers	Rado; Everett	4:33
15.	"Dying Breed" (from Imploding the Mirage)	Flowers; Rado; Mike Crossey; Alex Cameron; Klause J. Dinger; Michael Rother; Michael Karoli; Jaki Liebezeit; Irmin Schmidt; Holger Schuering; Kenji Suzuki	Rado; Everett	4:05
16.	"Pressure Machine" (from Pressure Machine, 2021)	Flowers; Keuning; Rado	Rado; Everett	4:43
17.	"Quiet Town" (from Pressure Machine)	Flowers; Rado	Rado; Everett	4:16
18.	"Boy" (previously released as a single)	Flowers; Price	Price; Everett	3:33
19.	"Your Side of Town" (previously released as a single)	Flowers; Price	Price; Everett	3:07
20.	"Spirit" (previously unreleased)	Flowers; Price	Price; Everett	2:58
Total length:				80:50

=== Notes ===
- ^{^[a]} signifies an additional producer
- ^{^[b]} signifies an assistant producer
- On CD editions, "The Man" and "Caution" are edited versions running for 3:41 and 3:26, respectively; the total running time for these editions is 79:20.

== Charts ==
=== Weekly charts ===
Weekly chart performance for Rebel Diamonds
Chart (2023–2025)	Peak position
Australian Albums (ARIA)	31
Belgian Albums (Ultratop Flanders)	91
Belgian Albums (Ultratop Wallonia)	177
Canadian Albums (Billboard)	70
French Rock & Metal Albums (SNEP)	22
German Albums (Offizielle Top 100)	97
Irish Albums (Official Charts)	1
New Zealand Albums (RMNZ)	16
Scottish Albums (Official Charts)	1
Spanish Albums (Promusicae)	80
UK Albums (Official Charts)	1
US Billboard 200	74
US Top Alternative Albums (Billboard)	6
US Top Rock Albums (Billboard)	10

=== Year-end charts ===
2024 year-end chart performance for Rebel Diamonds
Chart (2024)	Position
Australian Albums (ARIA)	87
New Zealand Albums (RMNZ)	46
UK Albums (OCC)	65

2025 year-end chart performance for Rebel Diamonds
Chart (2025)	Position
UK Albums (OCC)	93

== Certifications ==
Certifications for Rebel Diamonds
Region	Certification	Certified units/sales
New Zealand (RMNZ)	2× Platinum	30,000^{‡}
United Kingdom (BPI)	Platinum	300,000^{‡}
^{‡} Sales+streaming figures based on certification alone.
