= Boy (The Killers song) =

Single by the Killers

from the album Rebel Diamonds
- Released: August 5, 2022
- Recorded: 2022
- Genre: Synth-pop; arena rock; alternative rock
- Length: 3:18 (Non-album single); 3:33 (Rebel Diamonds version)
- Label: Island
- Songwriters: Brandon Flowers; Stuart Price
- Producers: Price; Shawn Everett

The Killers singles chronology
"Dustland" (2021)	"Boy" (2022)	"Your Side of Town" (2023)

Music video
- "Boy" on YouTube

"Boy" (stylized in all lowercase) is a song by American rock band the Killers, released as a non-album single on August 5, 2022, then later as the first single from their second greatest-hits album Rebel Diamonds (2023). A music video, directed by Boris Vassallo, was released on August 10, 2022.

== Background and composition ==
"Boy" was originally written before the release of the band's seventh studio album, Pressure Machine (2021), but was left off the album due to the differing sound and genre. Frontman Brandon Flowers remarked that "Boy" "was the first song written after we had to cancel the Imploding the Mirage tour due to the pandemic" in an interview with Rolling Stone magazine. Regarding the song's lyrics, Flowers said "I want to reach out and tell myself — and my sons — to not overthink it. And to look for the 'white arrows' in their lives." During an interview at Mad Cool Festival in Spain, Flowers described the song as having "an optimism to it. It’s in the dust, it’s in the gutter, and it’s looking at the stars. It’s writing in more of a new wave vehicle" with drummer Ronnie Vannucci Jr. adding that the song was "more polished."

The song was written by Flowers and Stuart Price, who co-wrote "Run for Cover" and "Out of My Mind" on Wonderful Wonderful and "Fire in Bone" on Imploding the Mirage, while the song was produced by Price and Shawn Everett, who produced Imploding the Mirage.

In terms of genres, "Boy" has been cited as synthpop, arena rock and alternative rock. It was written after Brandon Flowers returned to his hometown of Nephi, Utah, during the pandemic. Flowers remarked in a statement how he had "recently moved back to Utah and started to make trips to Nephi, where I grew up. I found that the place I had wanted to get away from so desperately at 16 was now a place that I couldn’t stop returning to." Regarding the lyrics, Flowers said "for me now, white arrows are my wife, children, my songs and the stage.” The song is written in the key of B♭.

== Release ==
"Boy" was debuted live at the Mad Cool Festival on July 7, 2022, in Madrid. The song was initially going to premiere over Instagram Live, but due to technical difficulties, the song was played live, with videos posted on social media afterwards. Boy was formally released as a single on August 5, 2022, and later on Rebel Diamonds as the first single. "Boy", along with "Your Side of Town", was intended to be one of two singles on a future eighth album, which was due for release in early 2023, but was eventually scrapped. Flowers later said the singles would be released on an EP, which was also scrapped.

"Boy", "Your Side of Town", and "Spirit", a previously unreleased track, were released on Rebel Diamonds as original songs, similar to "Shot at the Night" and "Just Another Girl" from their first greatest hits album, Direct Hits (2013). The Rebel Diamonds version of "Boy" has a slightly longer intro, stretching the runtime to 3:33.

== Music video ==
A music video, directed by Boris Vassallo, was released on August 10, 2022. The video, described as "a cinematic, surreal visual" by UDiscoverMusic, shows the band members in a forest watching a figure gallop atop a horse along a moonlit beach, while also cutting to shots of Flowers singing and the band members playing the song on a floating concrete slab. The video has 5 million views on YouTube as of September 2025.

== Reception ==
"Boy" received fairly positive reviews from critics. WERS 88.9 FM called the song a "synthy, echoey soundscape" with "a drum build, and a jubilant, ringing guitar riff [that marks] a dramatic transition sonically." Consequence of Sound called the song a "synth-rooted glow of the band’s third album, Day & Age", while GateCrashers Magazine expressed how "Boy is interesting in how much of a contrast it is to the Killers' last album Pressure Machine." NME remarked that "Boy is precision-engineered to be belted out with strangers at a stadium tour."

== Charts ==
Chart (2022)	Peak position
US Adult Alternative Airplay (Billboard)	1
US Hot Alternative Songs (Billboard)	12
US Rock & Alternative Airplay (Billboard)	1
US Alternative Airplay (Billboard)	1
US Adult Pop Airplay (Billboard)	29
US Hot Rock & Alternative Songs (Billboard)	17

== Release history ==
Region	Date	Format	Label	Ref.
Various	August 5, 2022	Digital download; streaming	Island	
