= Pi Gamma Mu =

International social studies honor society

- ΠΓΜ
- Founded: December 1, 1924; 101 years ago Southwestern College and College of William & Mary
- Type: Honor
- Affiliation: ACHS
- Status: Active
- Emphasis: Social sciences
- Scope: International
- Motto: Cognoscetis veritatem et veritas vos liberabit "Ye shall know the truth and the truth will set you free|the truth shall set you free"
- Pillars: Scholarship, Science, Social Science, Social Idealism, Sociability, Social Service, and Sacrifice
- Member badge
- Colors: Royal blue and White
- Flag
- Flower: Cineraria
- Publication: International Social Science Review
- Chapters: 92
- Members: 247,000+ lifetime
- Headquarters: 1001 Millington Street, Suite B Winfield, Kansas 67156; United States
- Website: www.pigammamu.org

Pi Gamma Mu or ΠΓΜ is an international honor society in the social sciences. The society was formed in 1924 at Southwestern College and the College of William & Mary. It is a member of the Association of College Honor Societies.

== History ==
On December 1, 1924, Leroy Allen, dean of the College of Liberal Arts at Southwestern College in Winfield, Kansas and William Angus Hamilton, dean of both the Law School and School of Business Administration at the College of William & Mary in Williamsburg, Virginia established Pi Gamma Mu. It was created as an honor society for the social sciences, integrating the fields of anthropology, economics, history, international relations, political science, and sociology.

Allen was a creative visionary, and Hamilton was a highly respected leader who was also described as "an authority on fraternal organizations and a leader in fraternal circles." By November 1924, the founding members led by Allen and Hamilton, had drafted a constitution for the society and issued charters to the first seventeen chapters, at mostly private, liberal arts colleges and universities.

The next year, the first issue of the society's official journal, Social Science (subtitled "For the scientific study of social problems"), was published and distributed to its members. The society was formally incorporated as a non-profit organization in the state of Colorado in 1929 under the name The National Social Science Honor Society, Pi Gamma Mu, Inc.

After Hamilton died in 1929, much of the groundwork for the new society had to be laid by Allen who served as its first national president from 1924 to 1931 and then national secretary from 1931 to 1947. At a time when few women held leadership positions anywhere, Pi Gamma Mu elected Grace Raymond Hebard, one of its founders, as its first national vice-president from 1924 to 1931. Succeeding presidents include the sociologist Charles A. Ellwood of Duke University who was a co-founder of the society and its president from 1931 to 1937; S. Howard Patterson (president, 1937–1951), a microeconomist who was then professor of economics at the Wharton School of the University of Pennsylvania; and political scientist Wilson Leon Godshall of Lehigh University, the society's president from 1951 until he died 1956 and under whose initiative the founding of foreign chapters was authorized.

The late 1920s and 1930s were a period of heightened growth for Pi Gamma Mu. Columbia University in New York City was the first large university to establish a chapter (1925) of the society. The University of Hawaii chapter was the first to be organized outside of the continental United States. In 1932, the first foreign chapter was chartered at the University of Toronto in Canada. Later that year, a chapter was installed at the University of the Philippines. In 1955, Gamma Mu chartered a chapter at the Pontifical Catholic University of Puerto Rico.

Pi Gamma Mu affiliated with the American Association for the Advancement of Science (AAAS) in 1947. It became a member of the Association of College Honor Societies (ACHS) in 1953.

To acknowledge its chapters outside of the United States, the board of trustees changed the name of the society to Pi Gamma Mu, International Honor Society in Social Sciences in 1980. In 1982, the name of its journal was also changed to International Social Science Review.

By 2012, it had 148 active chapters with 4,221 active members and 246,901 total initiates.

== Symbols ==
The honor society was named Pi Gamma Mu from the initials of the three Greek words that describe the society's objective: Politixes Gnōseōs Mathetai (Πολιτικές Γνώσεως Μάθεται), the study of political and social science. The term Politixes or "political science or phenomena" encompassed the field of economics, which was then commonly referred to as political economy.

Pi Gamma Mu's motto is an epigram of the Master Teacher, Cognoscetis veritatem et veritas vos liberabit, translated as "Ye shall know the truth and the truth shall set you free". It is traditionally recited during the initiation ceremonies for new members. Its original motto was "Let there be light". Part of the initiation and installation rituals is the declaration of the seven ideals or pillars of Pi Gamma Mu: Scholarship, Science, Social Science, Social Idealism, Sociability, Social Service, and Sacrifice.

The society’s gold key has a wreath, suggesting that social science is the outgrowth and fulfillment of natural science, and a running figure is reminiscent of the ancient Greek torch race and symbolizes humanity bringing knowledge to the solution of its own problems and passing on the light from generation to generation. In the key are engraved the Greek letters ΠΓΜ and 1924, the society's founding year.

Its colors are royal blue and white, representing truth and light. These are also the colors of the candles used during the initiation ceremonies and the honor cords or stoles worn at graduation. Its flower is the cineraria. The society's blue flag depicts a man and a woman jointly holding the torch of knowledge within the symbolic gold key and a wreath of Pi Gamma Mu.

== Membership ==
Membership in the society comes only through election by a college-based or university-based chapter. An individual is traditionally invited or may petition to join an active collegiate chapter of Pi Gamma Mu when a junior, senior, or graduate student ranked in the upper 35 percent of their class, with at least twenty semester hours in social science courses and a 3.0 GPA. Faculty and administrators may also join collegiate chapters.

Pi Gamma Mu's constitution defines the social sciences as including history, political science, sociology, anthropology, economics, psychology, international relations, criminal justice, social work, social philosophy, history of education, and human geography. Membership is also extended to interdisciplinary fields that build on the core disciplines, such as business administration, education, cultural and area studies, public administration, and organizational behavior.

== Activities ==
Pi Gamma Mu has international conventions and regional meetings. It started a scholarship program for its members in 1951. It provides five scholarships with stipends of $2,000 or $1,000 and six additional scholarships of $1,000 each to assist with the costs related to the first or second year of graduate study. These are awarded to selected members annually. The Guest Lectureship Program provides chapters with funds to cover the honoraria of guest lecturers.

Pi Gamma Mu publishes the International Social Science Review, a juried and indexed social science interdisciplinary journal. Pi Gamma Mu Newsletter was first published in 1978.

== Governance ==
The present constitution of the society provides for triennial conventions, with each chapter eligible to send a delegation. The convention is vested with the supreme authority of the society. During the convention, delegates elect two student representatives to the board of trustees, which exercises administrative power between conventions. The executive director of the society serves as an ex officio member of the governing board and oversees its day-to-day operations.

The Pi Gamma Mu international headquarters have always been located in Winfield, Kansas. It presently occupies the Carnegie Building, which is on the National Register of Historic Buildings.

== Chapters ==
Pi Gamma Mu currently has active chapters in over 92 colleges and universities.

== Notable members ==
Pi Gamma Mu membership includes notable scholars, diplomats, political leaders, business leaders, and pioneering professionals. The list is not exhaustive and is simply intended to illustrate the breadth of scholarship and service of the society's members.

Prominent members of the society include former U.S. president Lyndon B. Johnson, 1956 Nobel Prize winner and former Canadian prime minister Lester B. Pearson, former Philippine presidents José P. Laurel and Ferdinand Marcos, Panama Canal Treaty negotiator and former Panama president Ricardo Joaquín Alfaro Jované, leading anthropologist Margaret Mead, sociologist Pitirim Sorokin (Pi Gamma Mu national vice-president, 1937–1941) who founded Harvard University's sociology department, Edward A. Ross, a major figure in early criminology, Ernst Philip Boas, cardiologist and inventor of the cardiotachometer and original proponent of national health insurance, Jane Addams, 1931 Nobel Prize winner and pioneer community worker. Other notable members include MIT economist Charles P. Kindleberger who was architect of the Marsall Plan, US Senator Chuck Grassley of Iowa, Colorado Congresswoman Diana DeGette, deputy whip of the U.S. House of Representatives Judith Rodin, commissioner of the Federal Communications Commission Michael Copps, and Philippine senators Edgardo Angara, Miriam Defensor Santiago and Juan Ponce Enrile. Others include North Carolina Supreme Court senior justice Mark Martin, former U.S. Attorney General William French Smith, U.S. Secretary of the Treasury and Ambassador to NATO David M. Kennedy, 1971 Economics Nobel Prize winner Simon Kuznets, historian and 1949 Pulitzer Prize winner Roy Franklin Nichols, and football player Lem Burnham.

Former U.S. Transportation Secretary William Thaddeus Coleman, Jr., who was inducted into the University of Pennsylvania chapter in 1941, wrote the legal brief which won the U.S. Supreme Court's landmark decision in Brown v. Board of Education (1954) outlawing racial segregation in public education.

Another Pi Gamma Mu member, U.S. Navy Rear Admiral Richard Evelyn Byrd, the polar explorer and, served for a time as honorary national president of Pi Gamma Mu from 1931 to 1935. In 1928, Byrd carried the society's flag during a historic expedition to the Antarctic.

== See also ==
- History of the social sciences
- Honor cords
