= Black Romantic: The Figurative Impulse in Contemporary African-American Art =

Museum exhibition on African-American art

Black Romantic: The Figurative Impulse in Contemporary African-American Art was an exhibition held at the Studio Museum in Harlem from 25 April, 2002 until 23 June, 2002. The show was curated by Thelma Golden, the museum's Chief Curator. Black Romantic was a survey of Contemporary African-American genre painting whose stated purpose, as described by the Director of The Studio Museum, Lowery Stokes Sims was to show "elements of desire, dreams, determination, and romance particular to the black experience present a viewpoint that is oppositional to modernist conceptualization of blackness flavoured by exogenous exoticism, stereotype, caricature, and even abstractionist manipulation".

== Curation and artists ==
Black Romantic was immediately seen as a risky exhibition because it did not cater to the predominant and powerful desires of the art world to see postmodernism and irony in the work of Black American artists. Rather, it was curated from submissions to an open call. Many of the selected artists were lesser known at the time, and existed "almost exclusively outside the mainstream, within a parallel art world with distinct circuits of distribution, value, and reception supported by an enthusiastic black middle class". Many of these artists were quite commercially successful, though rarely, if at all, exhibited in well known galleries. The show's proclaimed purpose was to show a revisionist trend in Black American genre painting that was undoing the stereotypes of black suffering. The show featured what some might, and did, consider the conservative art of figurative painting. It was through these various representations of the figure that the works themselves, and the show as a whole endeavored to work against racist and modernist stereotypes, caricatures, and characterizations of the black experience. One of the ways in which the curation of the show took seriously the task of discussing these works from a so-called "other art world" was by publishing a catalog that featured full-page reproduction prints of the thirty artists' works.

The artists included in the show were:Alonzo Adams, Leroy Allen, Iana L. N. Amauba, Jules R. Arthur, III, Alexander Austin, Marlon H. Banks, Nina I. Buxenbaum, Clifford Darrett, Keith J. Duncan, Lawrence Finney, Gerald Griffin, James Hoston, Robert L. Jefferson, Oliver B. Johnson, Jr., Troy L. Johnson, Jonathan M. Knight, Jeanette Madden, Cal Massey, Dean Mitchell, Kadir Nelson, Leslie Printis, Robert V. Reid, Jonathon Romain, Philip Smallwood, Aj Smith, Toni L. Taylor, Hulbert Waldroup, Larry Walker, Shamek Weddle, and Kehinde Wiley.

== Reception and criticism ==
The show had been curated by Thelma Golden specifically to elicit reaction through its inclusion and curation of artworks not seen and accepted in the gallery art world. It garnered a mixed, somewhat negative reception. The main sources of criticism were the quality of the artwork and of Thelma Golden's own attitude towards the show. The most direct and scathing of these attitudes came from The New York Times. Reviewer Michael Kimmelman who writes, “I wonder whether Ms. Golden knows the extent to which she comes across as sabotaging her own artists in an accompanying catalog?” He further summarized Golden’s attitude by quoting saying, "While organizing the exhibition, Ms. Golden writes, she was 'physically unsettled' by what she perceived to be the 'overwrought sentiment' of the art. She 'shuddered at the crass commercialism' and the 'bombastic self-promotion.'The 'absence of irony,' she adds, 'was profound.' So the challenge for her was 'the suspension of judgment -- not curatorial or aesthetic judgment -- but the suspension of value judgment.'"

Aside from some critics’ negative opinion of Golden’s curatorial choices, the content of the show itself was controversial because the exhibition was meant to start conversations in the circles of the artworld by portraying work that was seen as kitschy, unfashionable, middle brow, or outsider art. Some critics didn’t believe that the various figurative paintings belonged together at all beyond the fact that they were figurative. Though many critics found fault with certain paintings on basis of form or merit, certain artists did stand out to different reviewers. Many did find a majority of these artworks middlebrow in a distasteful way. Proponents of the show found that distaste to be exactly the point of the show, to prove how the art world excludes certain classes, varieties, and races of painters from the "inside". As Kimmelman says, "Much hoop-jumping will be required by those who embrace well-connected white figurative painters like Elizabeth Peyton and Lisa Yuskavage to reject some of the unfashionable artists here -- or to say that an artist like Norman Rockwell is lousy but these artists are not. Or vice versa."

The show was indeed doing something by bringing these lesser-known in the art world into it. Some claimed it was never done before, which is contestable and was. However, many did think it was a worthwhile endeavor to attempt to disrupt the distinctions between who is in and who is out. The museum had done what many accused them of not doing, of representing the people who needed it most, of representing themselves and their neighbors, instead of those already in and fashionable. People and critics also saw that the Studio Museum occupied a tricky position. James Trainor, writing for Frieze put it most clearly, saying, "The Studio Museum in Harlem is in an unenviable position. On the one hand, it represents a community and a culture, while on the other it is committed to presenting the foremost achievements of African-American artists to a wider world. The museum has been criticized by some in the black community, especially in its own backyard, Harlem, for ignoring precisely this kind of art in favor of the highbrow avant-garde practices that will be accepted downtown. 'Black Romantic' seems to be an acknowledgment and a questioning of those criticisms, and deserves credit for raising the issue of which black artists are on the inside and which are on the outside, and why."
