= Your Side of Town =

Single by the Killers

from the album Rebel Diamonds
- Released: August 25, 2023
- Recorded: 2023
- Genre: Synth-pop
- Length: 3:07
- Label: Island
- Songwriters: Brandon Flowers; Stuart Price
- Producers: Price; Shawn Everett

The Killers singles chronology
"Boy" (2022)	"Your Side of Town" (2023)	"Bright Lights" (2024)

Music video
- "Your Side of Town" on YouTube

"Your Side of Town" is a song by American rock band the Killers, released as a non-album single on August 25, 2023, then later as the second single from their second greatest-hits album, Rebel Diamonds (2023). A music video, directed by Tim Mattia, was released on October 5, 2023.

The song garnered positive reviews from critics, notably for its "synth-heavy chorus [with] lovelorn lyrics" according to Rolling Stone. The song peaked at No. 91 on the UK Singles chart and No. 11 on Billboard's Adult Alternative Airplay chart.

== Background and composition ==
"Your Side of Town" was announced by the Killers on social media on August 22, 2023. Frontman Brandon Flowers remarked how in the song, he can "hear Pet Shop Boys, I hear New Order, [and] I hear Depeche Mode, but at the same time I really do feel like I can take ownership of it... it doesn't feel like a copy." Flowers also added that the song is "reminiscent of what I would have been listening to as a teenager in Las Vegas. It's kind of a beautiful collision of these influences that we've had over the years, that continue to influence us today, obviously."

The song was written by Flowers and Stuart Price, who co-wrote "Run for Cover" and "Out of My Mind" on Wonderful Wonderful (2017) and "Fire in Bone" on Imploding the Mirage (2020), while the song was produced by Price and Shawn Everett, who produced Imploding the Mirage. Preceding single "boy" was also written by Flowers and Price, and produced by Price and Everett. "Your Side of Town" has been described as synthpop, alternative rock, and new wave. The song has been performed live 32 times as of September 2025. The song is written in the key of D♭.

== Release ==
"Your Side of Town" had its live debut at the Reading Festival on August 26, 2023, the day after it was released on streaming platforms. The song was formally released as a non-album single on August 25, 2023, and later on Rebel Diamonds as the second single. Your Side of Town, along with previous stand alone single "boy", was intended to be the second of two singles on a future eighth album, which was due for release in early 2023. The album was eventually scrapped, however, Flowers later said the singles would be released on an EP, which was also scrapped. "Your Side of Town", "boy", and a third track titled "Spirit" were released on Rebel Diamonds as original songs, similar to the two from their first greatest hits album, Direct Hits (2013), "Shot at the Night" and "Just Another Girl".

== Music video ==
The music video for "Your Side of Town" was released on October 5, 2023. The video, directed by Tim Mattia, is shot entirely in black and white (though the artist and song title shown at the beginning of the video are in color) and follows a showgirl walking through Las Vegas, interspersed with scenes of frontman Brandon Flowers singing the song. Later, it is revealed that the showgirl is stalking a young woman, before kidnapping her and presumably murdering her. The music video was described as "eerie" by UDiscoverMusic and "creepy" by NME. The video has 1.1 million views on YouTube as of September 2025.

== Reception ==
"Your Side of Town" received positive reviews from critics. RSU Radio described the song as "loud and brimming with energy, strongly reminiscent of Daft Punk's 'Instant Crush' and the Pet Shop Boys mixed with New Order." The song was described as having "a distinctly darker and more layered electronic-based sound, [with] the poetic lyricism that fans have come to know from The Killers' songbook" by American Songwriter. Vanyaland.com detailed the song as leaning "into the more dramatic dancefloor side of their '80s synth-pop influences."

== Charts ==
Chart (2023)	Peak position
US Hot Rock & Alternative Songs (Billboard)	42
US Alternative Airplay (Billboard)	6
US Rock & Alternative Airplay (Billboard)	13
US Hot Alternative Songs (Billboard)	21
US Adult Alternative Airplay (Billboard)	11

== Release history ==
Region	Date	Format	Label	Ref.
Various	August 25, 2023	Digital download; streaming	Island	
