= Dean Mitchell =

American painter

- Born: 1957 (age 68–69); Pittsburgh, Pennsylvania, U.S.
- Education: Columbus College of Art & Design, Illustration, 1980
- Occupation: figurative artist
- Website: deanmitchellstudio.com

Dean Mitchell (born 1957) is an American figurative artist who works primarily in watercolor and oil paint. His subjects, derived largely from African American culture, have been cited for their emotional depth, avoidance of facile sentimentality, and accomplished sense of formal design.

Mitchell was born in Pittsburgh, Pennsylvania in 1957, and raised in Quincy, Florida. After graduating from the Columbus College of Art and Design in 1980, Mitchell moved to Kansas City, Missouri and started working as an illustrator at Hallmark Cards. He remained at Hallmark for the next three years and began entering national and international art competitions. When Hallmark terminated his employment in 1983, he decided to pursue painting as a full-time career.

Mitchell's artwork has been the subject of numerous articles, and is represented in museum and corporate collections, including the Kemper Museum of Contemporary Art, the Nelson-Atkins Museum of Art, and the Saint Louis Art Museum. His life is the subject of an illustrated book for children, Against All Odds: Artist Dean Mitchell's Story.

Mitchell has also illustrated US postage stamps, such as the 1995 Louis Armstrong stamp in the Jazz Musician series.

== Exhibitions ==
Year	Exhibit	Venue	Notes
1990	Reflections ‘90	Bruce R. Watkins Cultural Center, Kansas City, MO	Juried exhibition. Allen’s oil painting “Big Wind” features a jazz bassist. Other artists included Richard McGill, Dean Mitchell, and Joseph L. Smith.
1996	A Dean Mitchell Anthology	Marianna Kistler Beach Museum of Art, Manhattan, KS	Solo exhibition featuring architectural watercolors, oil paintings, and portraits.
1999	The Kansas City Six: A Reunion	Bruce R. Watkins Cultural Center, Kansas City, MO	Exhibit featured art by Leroy Allen, Thomas Blackshear II, Henry Dixon, Jonathan Knight, Dean Mitchell, Ezra Tucker.
2002	Black Romantic	Studio Museum in Harlem, New York City, NY	Artists included Dean Mitchell, Troy L. Johnson, Kadir Nelson and Kehinde Wiley.
2004	Works by Dean Mitchell: Coming Home	Gadsden Arts Center & Museum, Quincy, FL	Solo exhibition.
2004	Art: My Window to the World	American Jazz Museum, Kansas City, MO	Solo exhibition featuring 100 oil paintings, drawings, watercolors, and etchings.
2005	Second Light	Carter Art Center Gallery, Penn Valley Community College, Kansas City, MO	Fourteen artists exhibited including Dean Mitchell, Leroy Allen, George Mayfield, and Bonnye Brown.
2005	Backbone: Dean Mitchell's Images of African-American Men	Mississippi Museum of Art, Jackson, MS	Solo exhibition featuring 45 portraits of African-American men.
2008	Dean Mitchell's New Orleans	Gadsden Arts Center & Museum, Quincy, FL	Solo exhibition featuring 42 watercolors, acrylic, and oil paintings inspired by New Orleans before and after Hurricane Katrina.
2008	Everything's a Portrait: The Watercolors of Dean Mitchell	Cornell Museum of Art, Delray, FL	Solo exhibition featuring watercolors, as well as etchings, drawings, acrylic and oil paintings.
2010	Dean Mitchell: Visions with Heart and Soul	Leepa Rattner Museum of Art, Tarpon Springs, FL	Retrospective exhibition featuring drawings, watercolors, acrylic, and oil paintings.
2010	Dean Mitchell: Space, People and Places	Canton Museum of Art, Canton, OH	Solo exhibition featuring 40 recent watercolors.
2011	Dean Mitchell: Rich in Spirit	Gadsden Arts Center & Museum, Quincy, FL	Solo exhibition.
2015	Dean Mitchell: A Place, A Mental Space	Marianna Kistler Beach Museum of Art, Manhattan, KS	Solo exhibition of watercolor and oil paintings of scenes from the Pima-Maricopa Reservation (Phoenix, AZ) and the artist's hometown (Quincy, FL).
2016	Dean Mitchell's American West: Poverty and the Human Spirit	Gadsden Arts Center & Museum, Quincy, FL	Solo exhibition exploring poverty and the decay of the built environment inspired by visits to the Pima-Maricopa Reservation in Phoenix, AZ.
2020	Looking at America and Painting How I Want, What I Want and How I See It	Albany Museum of Art, Albany, GA	Solo exhibition featuring watercolor and acrylic paintings.
