= Dying Breed (The Killers song) =

2020 single by the Killers

Single by the Killers

from the album Imploding the Mirage
- Released: August 14, 2020
- Studio: Subtle McNugget Studios (Los Angeles); Electro-Vox Recording Studios (Los Angeles); Battle Born Studios (Las Vegas)
- Genre: Arena rock; synth rock
- Length: 4:05
- Label: Island
- Songwriters: Brandon Flowers; Jonathan Rado; Mike Crossey; Alex Cameron; Klause J. Dinger; Michael Rother; Michael Karoli; Jaki Liebezeit; Irmin Schmidt; Holger Schuering; Kenji Suzuki
- Producers: Jonathan Rado; Shawn Everett

The Killers singles chronology
"My Own Soul's Warning" (2020)	"Dying Breed" (2020)	"Dustland" (2021)

Visualizer video
- "Dying Breed" on YouTube

"Dying Breed" is a song by American rock band the Killers from their sixth studio album, Imploding the Mirage (2020). It was released on August 14, 2020, as the album's third and final single. The song contains excerpts of the songs "Hallogallo", by Neu!, and "Moonshake", by Can.

== Background and release ==
"Dying Breed" has existed since as early as May 2019, when frontman Brandon Flowers performed the song on piano during a soundcheck before a concert at the Walmart Arkansas Music Pavilion in Rogers, Arkansas. Frontman Brandon Flowers has described the lyrics of the song as "the prettiest and most romantic lyric [I've] ever written about [my] wife and muse Tana Mundkowsky" to NME. The song was described by Flowers as an "industrial vibe" that he enjoys, adding that "what [mixer Flood] did with it was a lot more stark than what we would have done, but it kept the spirit of the song. It has a heart to it that really grabs you." The song contains excerpts of the songs "Hallogallo" by German rock band Neu!, as well as "Moonshake" by fellow German rock band Can. "Dying Breed" was released as the third and final single from Imploding the Mirage on August 14, 2020.

The cover artwork is "Golden Mane" by American artist Thomas Blackshear.

== Reception ==
"Dying Breed" received positive reviews from critics. The song has been described by Rolling Stone magazine as "full-on arena rock glory", while NME praised the song for "heading back into synth-rock territory". GSG Media called the chorus of the song "bold" and the sound "enormous", adding how the Killers "combine infectious vocals with Brandon Flowers lending an unforgivable contagious vocal performance. So much so, the melody line cements itself deep with its piercing touch". Rolling Stone magazine later praised the song for showcasing "the Killers at their triumphant best, riding a steady, but tightly-wound chug over the course of the song’s first two minutes, then blowing it up at the halfway mark".

== Credits and personnel ==
Credits adapted from the liner notes of Imploding the Mirage.

=== Studios ===
- Subtle McNugget Studios (Los Angeles) – recording, mixing
- Electro-Vox Recording Studios (Los Angeles) – recording
- Battle Born Studios (Las Vegas) – recording
- Effie Street Studios (Los Angeles) – mixing
- Assault and Battery 1 (London) – mixing
- Ariel's Studio – mixing
- The Lodge (New York City) – mastering

=== The Killers ===
- Brandon Flowers – vocals, synth
- Ronnie Vannucci Jr. – drums
- Mark Stoermer – guitar

=== Additional personnel ===
- Jonathan Rado – bass, piano, slide guitar, E-Bow, harmonica, 12-string, celeste, acoustic guitar, synth
- Shawn Everett – drones
- Jonathan Rado – production
- Shawn Everett – production, recording, mixing
- Ariel Rechtshaid – mixing
- Dave Shiffman – mixing
- Flood – mixing
- Emily Lazar – mastering

== Charts ==
Chart (2020)	Peak position
New Zealand Hot Singles (RMNZ)	28
Scottish Singles Sales (Official Charts)	47

== Release history ==
Region	Date	Format	Label	Ref.
Various	August 14, 2020	Digital download; streaming	Island	
