= My Own Soul's Warning =

2020 single by The Killers

Single by the Killers

from the album Imploding the Mirage
- Released: June 17, 2020
- Studio: Subtle McNugget (Los Angeles); Electro-Vox (Los Angeles); Battle Born (Las Vegas)
- Length: 4:34
- Label: Island
- Songwriter: Brandon Flowers
- Producers: Jonathan Rado; Shawn Everett

The Killers singles chronology
"Caution" (2020)	"My Own Soul's Warning" (2020)	"Dying Breed" (2020)

Music videos
- "My Own Soul's Warning" on YouTube; "My Own Soul's Warning" (Michael Hili version) on YouTube

"My Own Soul's Warning" is a song by American rock band the Killers from their sixth studio album, Imploding the Mirage (2020). It was released on June 17, 2020, as the album's second single.

== Background ==
Album lead track, "My Own Soul's Warning" was written near the end of the Imploding the Mirage sessions, when frontman Brandon Flowers was worried that the album didn't have a single and he started to panic. It was the final song written for the album.

The band struggled to get the right mix for the song, going through nearly 90 mixes of it, with Flowers describing it as a “stubborn son of a bitch.”

Writing about the song for Apple Music, Flowers said that the song was about "repentance", which he acknowledged is "not a typical subject in a pop or rock song". He said he wanted to "write something that was meaningful to myself and that felt like it was going to transcend and resonate with a lot of people in a stadium or inside their headphones."

It is Flowers' favourite song on the Imploding the Mirage album.

The band leaked the intro to the song during a live stream on Instagram in April 2020, two months before it was released.

The cover artwork is by African-American artist Thomas Blackshear.

== Music videos ==
Two music videos have been made for the song.

=== First video ===
The first music video, released via YouTube on July 16, 2020, is a sneak peek from a forthcoming short film with director Sing Lee tied to the Killers' then-upcoming album Imploding the Mirage. The film will premiere on Apple Music. The music video has snippets reminding of an Americana theme. There are a number of stories going on.

=== Second video ===
The second music video, directed by Michael Hili, premiered on YouTube on August 20, 2020, just over a month after the first video. It features frontman Brandon Flowers and drummer Ronnie Vannucci Jr. going on a road trip together in a pickup truck through cornfields and snow-covered forests.

== Awards and accolades ==
Year	Ceremony	Award	Result
2021	MTV Video Music Award	Best Rock	Nominated

Uproxx listed it as No. 5 on its Best Songs of 2020. NME listed it as No. 14 on its Best Songs of 2020.

== Credits and personnel ==
Credits adapted from the liner notes of Imploding the Mirage.

=== Personnel ===
The Killers

- Brandon Flowers – vocals, synth, organ, glockenspiel
- Ronnie Vannucci Jr. – drums, percussion

Additional personnel

- Jonathan Rado – production, bass, organ, guitar, cello, string synth, piano
- Shawn Everett – production, recording, mixing
- Ivan Wayman – engineering
- Robert Root – engineering
- Ariel Rechtshaid – mixing
- Bobby Lee Parker – guitar
- Rob Moose – strings
- Roger Joseph Manning Jr. – keys
- Brian D'Addario – acoustic guitar
- Emily Lazar – mastering

=== Studios ===
- Recorded at Subtle McNugget Studios (Los Angeles), Electro-Vox Recording Studios (Los Angeles), and Battle Born Studios (Las Vegas)
- Mixed at Subtle McNugget Studios (Los Angeles) and Effie Street Studios (Los Angeles)
- Mastered at The Lodge (New York City)

== Charts ==
=== Weekly charts ===
Chart (2020)	Peak position
Belgium (Ultratip Bubbling Under Flanders)	27
Belgium (Ultratip Bubbling Under Wallonia)	39
Canada Rock (Billboard)	4
Scotland Singles (OCC)	23
Switzerland Airplay (Schweizer Hitparade)	79
UK Singles (OCC)	84
US Adult Alternative Airplay (Billboard)	4
US Alternative Airplay (Billboard)	7
US Hot Rock & Alternative Songs (Billboard)	19
US Rock & Alternative Airplay (Billboard)	10
Wales (OCC)	41

=== Year-end charts ===
Chart (2020)	Position
US Adult Alternative Songs (Billboard)	35
US Alternative Songs (Billboard)	32

== Release history ==
Region	Date	Format	Label	Ref.
Various	June 17, 2020	Digital download; streaming	Island	
