= Quiet Town =

2021 song by the Killers

Promotional single by the Killers

from the album Pressure Machine
- Released: August 13, 2021
- Recorded: 2020–2021
- Studio: Battle Born (Las Vegas)
- Genre: Alternative rock; heartland rock
- Length: 4:45 (unabridged version); 4:16 (abridged version)
- Label: Island
- Songwriters: Brandon Flowers; Jonathan Rado
- Producers: Rado; Shawn Everett

Music video
- "Quiet Town" on YouTube

"Quiet Town" is a song by American rock band the Killers. It is the second track from the band's seventh studio album, Pressure Machine (2021). The song was released as a promotional single on August 13, 2021, alongside an accompanying music video the same day. The song peaked at No. 40 on the Billboard Rock & Alternative Airplay chart and No. 9 on the Adult Alternative Airplay chart.

== Background and release ==
"Quiet Town" was written by frontman Brandon Flowers and record producer Jonathan Rado, who previously worked with the band on Imploding the Mirage (2020). Flowers and Rado, along with guitarist Dave Keuning and drummer Ronnie Vannucci Jr. on select songs, wrote the entirety of Pressure Machine together, except for "Terrible Thing" and "Runaway Horses", written solely by Flowers.

The song first appeared in a tweet by the Killers on December 22, 2020, under the name "In This Quiet Town", listed as the eleventh track from an upcoming studio album. The song was first audibly teased by the Killers on social media in a fifty-six second teaser video titled posted to the band's YouTube channel on August 2, 2021. The video depicts the band walking around the town of Nephi, with the song supposedly playing off a jukebox shown in the video. The title of the song was revealed in a tweet of the track listing of Pressure Machine made by the Killers the same day. The song was teased in another trailer one week later, on August 9, 2021. "Quiet Town" was released as a promotional single on August 13, 2021, the same day as the release of Pressure Machine, alongside an animated music video.

=== Composition ===
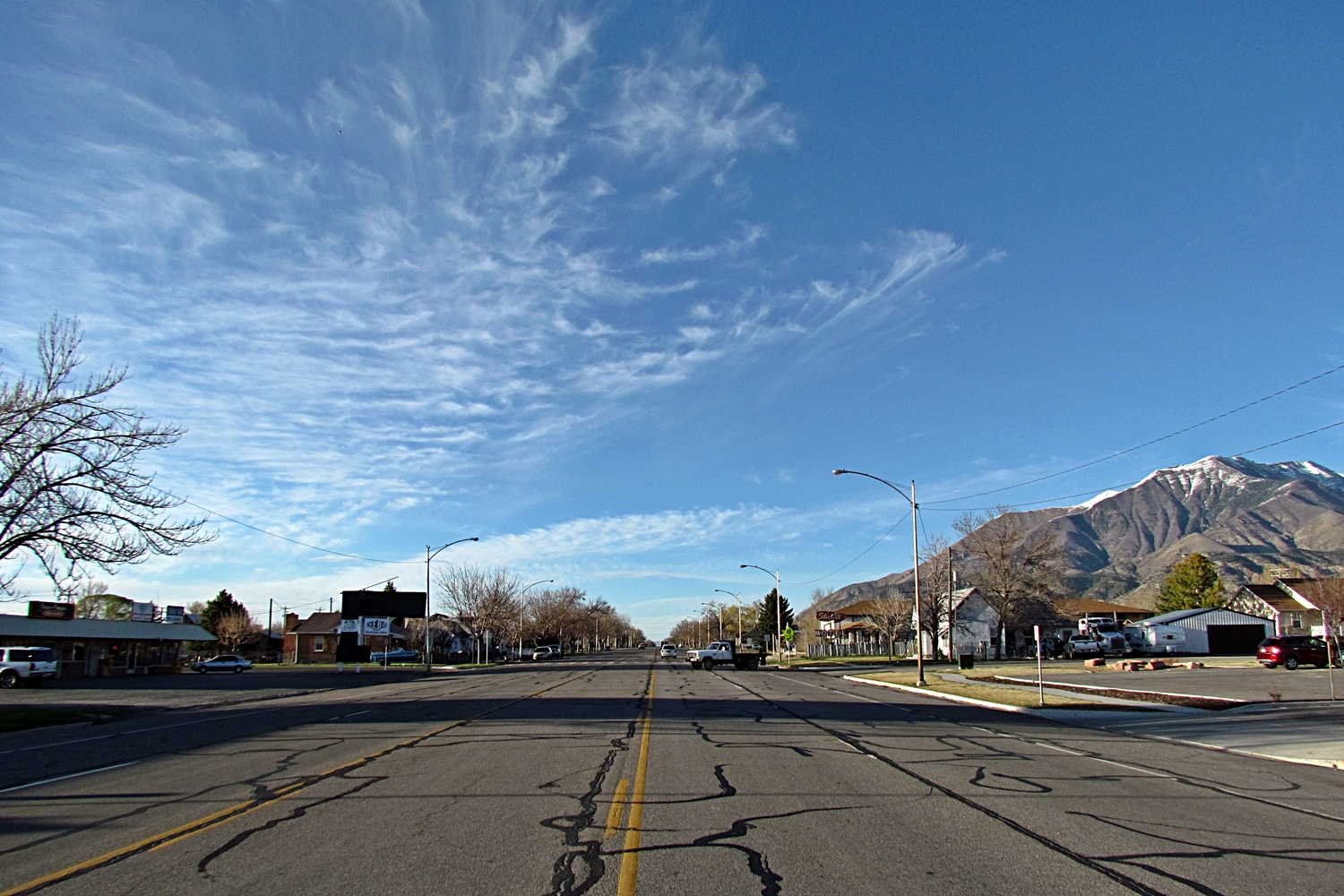
Nephi, Utah, Flowers' hometown and subject of the song, 2012.

The lyrics of the song reflect on the story of Tiffany JaNae Taylor and Raymond Leo Newton, a teenage couple who were both 17 year old students at Juab High School in Nephi, Utah when they were killed in a grade crossing accident with a freight train in 1994. In an interview with NME, frontman Brandon Flowers described how "25 years later, I was still really affected by this train accident from when I was in the eighth grade. Two seniors from the high school were killed. I had seen one of them that morning. They had a baby. [...] I was just shocked at how emotional I was when I started to write this verse.” The un-abridged version of the song contains a snippet at the start of the song of a Nephi resident detailing how "every two or three years, the train kills somebody," adding that "the train is a way to find your way out of this life if you get hit by it". The song's second verse references the historic problem of opioid usage in Nephi, with lyrics such as "when we first heard opioid stories, they were always in whispering tones". Of this lyrics, Flowers' said: “Since I’ve left Nephi, [...] opioids have left their ugly mark on the town, our friends and acquaintances. While a lot of these songs took place in the ’90s, we saw more overdose deaths in 2020 during the pandemic than any other year in recorded history."

=== Notes from a Quiet Town ===
On March 17, 2022, the Killers posted a 30 second teaser on social media of "Notes from a Quiet Town," a documentary slated for release on March 21 via Facebook, alongside the release of the deluxe edition of Pressure Machine on March 25. The documentary, directed by Robert Machoian, premiered on Facebook on March 21 and later on YouTube on March 23. "Notes from a Quiet Town" was recorded throughout July 2021 in Nephi, just before the release of Pressure Machine. The 33-minute documentary compiles footage of the band performing "Cody" and "Quiet Town" in a Nephi backyard, Brandon Flowers and Jake Blanton performing "Terrible Thing" in the Juab High School gymnasium, the Ute Stampede Rodeo, as well as the Ute Stampede Bathing Beauty competition. The video also includes interviews with residents of Nephi, with most of the interviewees being the voices heard at the start of songs on the un-abridged version of Pressure Machine. The documentary received positive reviews upon release, with Virgin Radio UK remarking that the "legends have treated fans to versions of Cody, Terrible Thing, and Quiet Town in their new documentary and live film."

== Reception ==
"Quiet Town" was met with positive reviews from critics. In 2023, Ticketmaster UK ranked the song second on their list of the 11 best songs by the Killers, noting that it's "one of Brandon Flowers’ most restrained vocal performances, stripped of bravado but filled with yearning." The Ithacan praised the song for its "vocals [which] are achingly mournful, though the dramatic sadness of the musical accompaniment is only an enhancing backdrop for the lyrical content of the track. [...] Piano notes beat like raindrops in a backdrop of the small town’s depressing downpour." The A.V. Club called "Quiet Town" "a haunting ode to a town’s gone-too-soon youth," while Riff Magazine described it as "highly evocative of John Mellencamp, [...] essentially a sadder version of Mellencamp’s 'Jack and Diane.'" Guitar.com proclaimed the song as being "driven by sparkling acoustic chords, yet beneath the sprightly chorus and Joe Pug’s wailing harmonica lies devastating grief."

== Music video ==
The music video for "Quiet Town" was released on August 13, 2021. The music video, which is animated, is set in Nephi and follows the lyrics of the song, depicting the day of the death of Taylor and Newton, the opioid epidemic in Nephi, and Brandon Flowers as a child in the town. The video was directed by Joshua Britt and Neilson Hubbard, and was animated by Neighborhoods Apart, a Nashville-based production studio founded by the duo. HeadButler.com praised the video for how “it makes you feel as if you’ve experienced a feature-length film about the big sky and unpopulated valleys of the West."

== Credits and personnel ==
=== The Killers ===
- Brandon Flowers – vocals, synthesizer
- Ronnie Vannucci Jr. – drums

==== Additional musicians ====
- Jonathan Rado – piano, synthesizer, guitar, bass
- Joe Pug – harmonica
- Anjolee Williams – background vocals
- Charles "ChuckHeat" Henderson-McCrary – background vocals

==== Technical ====
- Jonathan Rado – producer
- Shawn Everett – producer, mixer, recording engineer
- Chris Allgood – mastering engineer
- Emily Lazar – mastering engineer
- Jed Jones – recording engineer
- Matt Breunig – recording engineer
- Will Maclellan – recording engineer
- Alec Eitram – recording engineer
- Raoul Ahmad – recording engineer

== Charts ==
Chart (2021)	Peak position
Switzerland (Schweizer Hitparade)	81
UK Singles (Official Charts)	65
US Adult Alternative Airplay (Billboard)	9
US Rock & Alternative Airplay (Billboard)	40
