= Leroy Allen =

American painter

- Born: May 24, 1951; Kansas City, Kansas
- Died: March 9, 2007 (aged 55); Kansas City, Kansas
- Education: University of Kansas School of Fine Arts
- Occupation: artist
- Children: Daughters Jaime and LeTia

Leroy Allen (1951-2007), was an American watercolorist and figurative artist. His realistic style focused on African American life and community, and won him more than 30 art awards nationally.

== Biography ==
Allen was a Kansas City, Kansas native. He received his first art prize in the second grade when he won a National Scholastic Art Award for a crayon drawing of a horse show called “At the American Royal”. During high school, Allen was hired by the Progressive Shopper News, a black-owned monthly newspaper, to draw a weekly cartoon column. The cartoon was about a character named Sly, an unsuccessful criminal, and was used to discourage young people from a life of crime. In high school, the comic series Allen created became a comic book.

Allen joined the Army and served in Vietnam and was honorably discharged in 1972.

Upon graduation from the University of Kansas School of Fine Art (BFA, 1977), Allen was hired by Hallmark Cards in 1980, where he became a technical supervisor. Over the years, Allen worked with and exhibited with noted Hallmark artists including Thomas Blackshear, Nancy Devard, Henry Dixon, Shane Evans, Cathy Ann Johnson, Jonathan Knight, and Dean Mitchell. He retired from Hallmark Cards after 24 years.

Of Allen's artistic skill, New Orleans art critic Doug MacCash wrote: "Although many people think of watercolor as the genteel choice of Sunday painters, it may actually be the most difficult artistic technique to master. A great watercolorist is able to create a painting with such economy and deftness that the hand of the artist is almost unnoticeable - a feat akin to walking across a snowy field without leaving footprints. Both (Leroy) Allen and (Dean) Mitchell can do just that."

== Exhibitions ==
Year	Exhibit	Venue	Notes
1990	Reflections '90	Bruce R. Watkins Cultural Center, Kansas City, MO	Juried exhibition. Allen's oil painting “Big Wind” features a jazz bassist. Other artists included Richard McGill, Dean Mitchell, and Joseph L. Smith.
1992	Gallery '92	Kaw Valley Arts and Humanities, Kansas City, MO	Virginia Mecklenburg, curator, National Museum of American Art, juror. Allen won one award for the character study, “Ma'am”.
1999	The Kansas City Six: A Reunion	Bruce R. Watkins Cultural Center, Kansas City, MO	Exhibit featured art by Leroy Allen, Thomas Blackshear II, Henry Dixon, Jonathan Knight, Dean Mitchell, Ezra Tucker.
2000	Black Creativity	Museum of Science and Industry, Chicago, IL	Allen also was included in the Black Creativity exhibits of 1996, 1997, and 1998.
2002	Black Romantic	Studio Museum in Harlem	Allen's works included were watercolors “Contemplation”, “Sundrops” and charcoal on paper pieces “The Glance”and “Papa Jim”. Other artists included Troy L. Johnson, Kadir Nelson and Kehinde Wiley.
2003	Celebrations and Investigations: African-American Artists in Kansas City Collections	Gallery at Village Shalom, Kansas City Jewish Museum, MO	Artists including Leroy Allen, Dawoud Bey, NedRa Bonds, Sonya Y. S. Clark, Kerry James Marshall, Robert A. Powell, Lezley Saar, Lorna Simpson, Renee Stout, Kara Walker and Carrie Mae Weems.
2003	The Light in the Other Room	American Jazz Museum, Kansas City, MO	Willis “Bing” Davis, curator. Exhibiting with Allen were 20 artists including NedRa Bonds, Ed Hogan, Lonnie Powell.
2004	Sacred Center	Stella Jones Gallery, New Orleans, LA	Two-person exhibit with Dennis Paul Williams.
2004	Southern Journeys	Alexandria Museum of Art, Alexandria LA	Allen is one of 80 artists, including Henry O. Tanner, John Biggers, Jacob Lawrence and Romare Bearden.
2005	Second Light	Carter Art Center Gallery, Penn Valley Community College, Kansas City, MO	Fourteen artists exhibited including Allen, Dean Mitchell, George Mayfield, and Bonnye Brown.
2007	You Know What's Real	Nerman Museum of Contemporary Art, Overland Park, KS	Works on paper from the museum's permanent collection, including work by Allen.
2009	Collaborations: Two Decades of African American Art: Hearne Fine Art 1988-2008	Pyramid / Hearne Fine Art, Little Rock, AR	57 artists including Leroy Allen, Benny Andrews, Phoebe Beasley, Bisa Butler, Elizabeth Catlett, Frank Frazier, Paul Goodnight, Jonathan Green, Brenda Joysmith, Phyllis Stephens, and William Tolliver.
2012	Shades of Greatness	Campanella Gallery, Park University, Arkville, MO	A traveling exhibition organized by the Negro Leagues Baseball Museum, 35 pieces, including works by Leroy Allen, Bonnye Browne and Kadir Nelson.
2017	A Dazzling Decade	Nerman Museum of Contemporary Art, Overland Park, KS	Art from the museum's permanent collection, including work by Allen.

== Awards ==
- “Nestle in Sunset”, Miriam Whitsett Memorial Award, Mississippi Museum of Art, Jackson, MS (2003)
- “Sundrops”, a watercolor painting, Connoisseur Award, California Watercolor Association's 35th National Exhibition, Academy of Art College Gallery, San Francisco, CA (2003)
- Jurors Award, Arizona Aqueous XVI 2001 National Juried Exhibition, Tubac Center for the Arts, Tubac, AZ (2001).
- “Papa Jim”, a charcoal piece, Best Drawing Award, Bosque Conservatory Art Council's 16th Annual National Art Competition, Bosque Conservatory, Clifton, TX (2001).
- Merchandise Award, Pastel Society of North Florida at the Fort Walton Beach Museum of Art, “Pastel '98” juried exhibition.
- “Ma'am” (Tribute to P.H. Polk), Juror's Award of Excellence, Oklahoma Art Workshops' 11th Annual National Juried Exhibition (1994).

== Collections ==
- Nerman Museum of Contemporary Art, Overland Park, KS
- Petrucci Family Foundation Collection of African American Art
- Sprint Nextel Art Collection includes Allen's American Sunrise, a still life featuring a blue pitcher with berries.
- Portrait of first African American mayor of St. Louis Freeman R. Bosley, Jr. by Leroy Allen, St. Louis City Hall, 2nd floor with portraits of past mayors.

== Death ==
Allen died of suicide in March 2007 and is laid to rest in Kansas City, Kansas. In 2008, “This One I'll Do (For Leroy)”, a charcoal portrait of Leroy Allen by artist Lonnie Powell, was included in the exhibit “To Create a Better World: Artists as Educators.”
