= Ernst Philip Boas =

American physician (1891–1955)

Ernst Philip Boas (February 4, 1891 – March 9, 1955) was an American physician. He was a pioneer in the fields of pathology and physiology and was a highly respected expert in chronic diseases of the heart. He developed the cardiotachometer, a widely used instrument for measuring the rapidity of heartbeat.

Boas served as medical director of several leading hospitals in New York City, including Montefiore Hospital and Mount Sinai Hospital, and as professor of cardiology at Columbia University's College of Physicians and Surgeons and its Teachers College. He authored several books and scientific articles, mostly on the subject of cardiovascular disease.

== Biography ==
=== Early years ===
Boas was born in Worcester, Massachusetts to German anthropologist Franz Boas, regarded by many as the father of modern anthropology. Boas earned both his B.S. and M.D. degrees from Columbia University. He was elected to the American Philosophical Society for outstanding scientific contributions to the study of heart disease, particularly cholesterol and arteriosclerosis. He was a member of the honor societies of Phi Beta Kappa in liberal arts, Pi Gamma Mu in social sciences, and Alpha Omega Alpha in medicine.

=== Career ===
Boas was an early advocate of a universal health care system and insurance, and equal distribution of medical services. In 1939, he organized a group called the Physician's Forum for the Study of Medical Care to study and discuss health care issues. It had a membership of about 3,000 doctors from the American Medical Association, which at the time opposed universal health insurance. In addition to his medical director and teaching positions, he also served on a variety of public health committees organized by New York City government.

Besides his medical work, Boas, like his father, was also deeply involved in and committed to social causes and social service. He worked with such agencies as the China Aid Council, the Emergency Committee in Aid of Displaced Foreign Medical Scientists (serving as Secretary in 1945), the Committee of Physicians for the Improvement of Medical Care, the National Committee for Resettlement of Foreign Physicians, the Physicians Committee of the National Refugee Service (serving as Chairman in 1943), and the United Service for New Americans. He also worked against discrimination of any form; for instance, he was instrumental in the appointment of African-American physicians and nurses to hospital staffs.

He was a leading member or officer of the American Heart Association, the American Medical Association, the American Society for the Study of Arteriosclerosis (founding member), the Authors' Guild, the Child Study Association of America, the Committee for the Nation's Health, the Committee of Citizens Against the Feinberg Law (a law to eliminate subversives from the New York state public school system), the Harvey Society, the Medical Society of the County of New York, the National Medical Committee of the NAACP, the New York Academy of Medicine, the New York Heart Association (founding member and Chairman), the New York Tuberculosis and Health Association (Chairman of the Heart Committee), and the United States Committee (founding member), an organization created in support of the World Medical Association.

=== Personal life ===
Boas died of pancreatic cancer at Mount Sinai Hospital in New York City. He was survived by his wife, the former Helen Tuthill Sisson, his sons Norman F. Boas and Donald P. Boas, and his daughter Barbara Crutchley.
