= Caution (The Killers song) =

Single by the Killers

from the album Imploding the Mirage
- Released: March 12, 2020
- Studio: Subtle McNugget (Los Angeles); Electro-Vox (Los Angeles); Battle Born (Las Vegas)
- Genre: Heartland rock; pop rock; synth-pop
- Length: 4:29 (album version); 3:48 (radio edit)
- Label: Island
- Songwriters: Brandon Flowers; Mark Stoermer; Ronnie Vannucci Jr.; Alex Cameron; Shawn Everett; Jonathan Rado
- Producers: Jonathan Rado; Shawn Everett

The Killers singles chronology
"Land of the Free" (2019)	"Caution" (2020)	"My Own Soul's Warning" (2020)

Music video
- "Caution" on YouTube

"Caution" is a song by American rock band the Killers from their sixth studio album, Imploding the Mirage (2020). It was released on March 12, 2020, as the lead single from the album, and features a guitar solo by former Fleetwood Mac guitarist Lindsey Buckingham. The track topped the Billboard Rock Airplay and Alternative Airplay charts.

== Background ==
Flowers described the song as "about having the wherewithal to listen to that angel on your shoulder, even if they're telling you something that you don't want to hear." Flowers related this to his own decision to leave Las Vegas with his family and moving back to his childhood home in Utah, which began as a hunch, and although it was tough for him to leave, he embodied the "spirit" of "Caution" in recognising that it was the right decision for him and for his family.

The end of the song features a guitar solo from former Fleetwood Mac guitarist Lindsey Buckingham. This originated when drummer Ronnie Vannucci joked over dinner that they should call Buckingham up and ask him to do a solo for the song. When the band did so, Buckingham obliged, and he turned up at the studio the next day. This was aided by the fact that the band shares a publicist with Buckingham. Vannucci said that, when recording, Buckingham "did all the sort of famed tricks", and that the band slowed the tape to half-speed or quarter-speed when recording Buckingham's guitar-playing to allow them to record the song's crystal-like high tinkle sounds. Afterwards, Buckingham stayed to record a solo; this ultimately became the ending of the song, as the band hadn't yet written one at the time.

The cover artwork is "Golden Breeze" by American artist Thomas Blackshear.

An alternative, stripped-back version of the song was included on the deluxe edition of Imploding the Mirage, released in January 2021, under the name "Caution (Wasatch Style)".

== Music video ==
The music video is a sneak peek from a forthcoming short film with director Sing Lee tied to the Killers upcoming album Imploding the Mirage. The film will premiere on Apple Music. The music video has snippets reminding of an Americana theme. There are a number of stories going on. A stage play is being enacted, a story of young love, some family drama and family intrigue with police intervening and so on. There is also footage of the Killers performing at what is seemingly a local venue.

== In popular culture ==
This song appears in video games Dirt 5, Forza Horizon 5 and as DLC for Rock Band 4

== Awards ==
Year	Ceremony	Award	Result
2020	MTV Video Music Award	Best Rock	Nominated

Pitchfork ranked Caution the 94th best song of 2020.

== Credits and personnel ==
Credits adapted from the liner notes of Imploding the Mirage.

=== Recording locations ===
- Recorded at Subtle McNugget Studios (Los Angeles), Electro-Vox Recording Studios (Los Angeles), and Battle Born Studios (Las Vegas)
- Mixed at Subtle McNugget Studios (Los Angeles)
- Mastered at The Lodge (New York City)

=== Personnel ===
The Killers

- Brandon Flowers – vocals, synth
- Ronnie Vannucci Jr. – drums, percussion
- Mark Stoermer – bass, guitar

Additional personnel

- Jonathan Rado – production, string synth, acoustic guitar, slide guitar, drones
- Shawn Everett – production, recording, mixing
- Ivan Wayman – engineering
- Robert Root – engineering
- Lindsey Buckingham – guitar
- Blake Mills – guitar, bass, Bass IV
- Lucius – background vocals
- Emily Lazar – mastering

== Charts ==
=== Weekly charts ===
Chart (2020)	Peak position
Belgium (Ultratip Bubbling Under Flanders)	10
Belgium (Ultratip Bubbling Under Wallonia)	32
Canada Rock (Billboard)	3
Euro Digital Song Sales (Billboard)	17
Mexico Airplay (Billboard)	17
Mexico Ingles Airplay (Billboard)	1
Netherlands (Dutch Top 40 Tipparade)	16
New Zealand Hot Singles (RMNZ)	28
Scotland Singles (OCC)	13
Switzerland Airplay (Schweizer Hitparade)	65
UK Singles (OCC)	95
US Adult Contemporary (Billboard)	26
US Adult Pop Airplay (Billboard)	16
US Digital Song Sales (Billboard)	19
US Hot Rock & Alternative Songs (Billboard)	3
US Rock & Alternative Airplay (Billboard)	1
Wales (OCC)	65

=== Year-end charts ===
Chart (2020)	Position
US Adult Top 40 (Billboard)	47
US Hot Rock & Alternative Songs (Billboard)	28
US Rock Airplay (Billboard)	8

== Certifications ==
Region	Certification	Certified units/sales
Australia (ARIA)	Gold	35,000^{‡}
^{‡} Sales+streaming figures based on certification alone.

== Release history ==
Region	Date	Format	Label	Ref.
Various	March 12, 2020	Digital download; streaming	Island	
United Kingdom	March 12, 2020	Contemporary hit radio	Island	
United States	April 27, 2020	Hot AC radio	Island; Republic	
United States	June 30, 2020	Contemporary hit radio	Island; Republic	
