= Phoebe Beasley =

American artist (born 1943)

- Born: June 3, 1943 (age 83); Cleveland, Ohio, U.S.
- Education: Ohio University (BFA); Kent State University (MFA)
- Occupation: Collage artist
- Awards: Honorary PhD from Ohio University

Phoebe Beasley (born June 3, 1943) is an American artist. Beasley is the only artist whose art has been awarded the Presidential Seal under two different U.S. presidents: George H. W. Bush and Bill Clinton. Beasley was the first African-American woman to become president of the Los Angeles County Arts Commission. She was the official artist of the 1987 and 2000 Los Angeles Marathons.

== Early life and education ==
Phoebe Beasley was born in Cleveland, Ohio. She has two siblings. Her mother died of a heart attack at the age of 29 (when Phoebe was 7 years old).

Her father later married Mildred Gaines, an artist who brought her to the Cleveland Institute of Art and other cultural institutions.

Beasley's high school guidance counselor told her that she should not major in art because there was "no such thing as an African-American artist".

Beasley received a Bachelor of Fine Arts in art education from Ohio University in 1965, and a Master of Fine Arts degree from Kent State University. She received an honorary Doctorate of Fine Arts from Ohio University in 2005. She also delivered the commencement address that year.

== Career ==
Beasley worked selling time for KFI and KOST. She was told multiple times by white gallery owners, "I don't carry black art." She was also asked "why do you always paint black subjects?" Beasley has said, "It was strange – especially since they were painting nothing but white subjects ... Most of my themes are what I know, based on my point of reference, just like any other artist."

In 1977, Beasley became the first African-American woman appointed president of American Women in Radio and Television

From 1997 to 2012, she spent 15 years as a commissioner on the Los Angeles County Arts Commission.

In 2012, she was one of 44 artists commissioned to make a collage on a life-size bust of President Barack Obama.

In 2013, she was given the Lifetime Achievement Award for Visual Arts & Advocacy by the California African American Museum.

In 2015, her most expensive work to date was sold for $11,875 at Swann Auction Galleries. That year, she was also appointed to the California Arts Council in 2015 by former California Governor Jerry Brown.

Many celebrities have purchased Beasley's work, including Oprah Winfrey, Tyler Perry, Shonda Rhimes, and Tavis Smiley.

== Art inspiration ==
Beasley says she likes to make beautiful things out of "other people's trash", and that her creativity comes out as she works with texture, since she considers collage her main medium of art. She explains one of her collages of flowers as representing "humanity – they represented living and dying ... It does not matter how much you nurture something, we are all going to die".

== Personal life ==
Beasley was good friends with her mentor Maya Angelou, who is quoted as saying "Phoebe Beasley's eye has never failed her, has never lied to her, and her art generously gives us beauty, information, and always the truth."

Beasley said if she had it her way, she would wear a ball gown every day.
