= Pressure Machine =

- Standard edition cover

Studio album by the Killers
- Released: August 13, 2021
- Recorded: 2020–2021
- Studio: Battle Born (Las Vegas)
- Genres: Americana; heartland rock; folk rock
- Length: 51:17
- Label: Island
- Producers: Jonathan Rado; Shawn Everett

The Killers chronology
Imploding the Mirage (2020)	Pressure Machine (2021)	Rebel Diamonds (2023)

Alternate cover
- Deluxe edition cover

Pressure Machine is the seventh studio album by American rock band the Killers. It was released on August 13, 2021. The album features the return of guitarist Dave Keuning to the studio with the band, after his absence on the previous album, Imploding the Mirage, while bassist Mark Stoermer was absent due to difficulties caused by the COVID-19 pandemic during recording. Jonathan Rado and Shawn Everett returned to produce the album.

Pressure Machine is a concept album based on lead singer Brandon Flowers' childhood in Nephi, Utah. The album features a guest collaboration from singer Phoebe Bridgers on the track "Runaway Horses". Heavily influenced by Bruce Springsteen, lyrical influences also include The Pastures of Heaven by John Steinbeck and Winesburg, Ohio by Sherwood Anderson.

Pressure Machine has received generally positive reviews from critics and charted moderately well in a number of territories. It reached number nine on the US Billboard 200 and topped both the Top Rock Albums and Top Folk Albums charts, becoming the band's first album to chart on the latter. The album also became the Killers' seventh consecutive number-one album on the UK Albums Chart. No singles were released from the album, although music videos were produced for "Quiet Town" and "Runaway Horses" as well as "The Getting By II" from the deluxe edition.

== Background ==
Pressure Machine originated during the early months of the COVID-19 pandemic when the Killers recognized that the planned Imploding the Mirage Tour would have to be postponed. Although the Killers briefly considered using some of the songs left over from Imploding the Mirage to start their next album, they instead chose to embrace the idea of a concept record based on Brandon Flowers's childhood. Drummer Ronnie Vannucci Jr. described the choice by saying “But the sky was falling and we were hit with this emotion – especially Brandon. We wanted to do something following that feeling. I remember him saying, ‘Follow me down this road’. We put those songs to the side and embarked on something new and fresh. That's what became ‘Pressure Machine’.” Dave Keuning rejoined the band in studio after having completed his own solo album A Mild Case of Everything, released in June 2021.

== Music and lyrics ==
Musically, the album has been described as Americana, heartland rock and folk rock. Flowers decided to write all the lyrics to the album prior to writing the album's music, and in the process tried to reflect on his own childhood.

For "Quiet Town", Flowers reflected on a teenage couple, Tiffany JaNae Taylor and Raymond Leo Newton, that were killed at a grade crossing accident with a Union Pacific train in 1994 when both were 17 years old. "Here, 25 years later, I was still really affected by this train accident from when I was in the eighth grade ... Two seniors from the high school were killed. I had seen one of them that morning. They had a baby. I didn't go to grief counselling, they weren't my best friends – but I was just shocked at how emotional I was when I started to write this verse." Other aspects of the lyrics were based on the opioid epidemic, with the opening track "West Hills" narrating the story of an opioid addict in "possession of them hillbilly heroin pills."

The lyrics for the song "Terrible Thing" were written from the perspective of a gay teenager contemplating suicide as Flowers described, "There were kids I grew up with who I didn't know until years later that they were gay ... It must have just been so hard. I think the world is moving in a more positive direction and a more inclusive direction, but this was still in the 90s and people kept this stuff close." The song "Runaway Horses" featuring Phoebe Bridgers was partially inspired by her own cover of "Human" in 2019.

For recording the band chose to use analog recording methods. As Flowers described, "You can get caught up in having money, and having time, in studios, and laboring over something. We were definitely guilty of that. This was different. Shawn was not allowed to mix on the computer. We are mixing on a board, old school to tape, and we weren't making a bunch of changes. We're going to try to keep the dust on this thing." Sonically, the band took inspiration from Johnny Cash, John Prine, and Nebraska by Bruce Springsteen. Influence for the spoken word interludes came from This American Life.

== Release ==
The band announced the album on social media on July 19, 2021. The album was later released on August 13, 2021, less than a year after their previous studio album, Imploding the Mirage.

A deluxe edition of the album, featuring seven reimagined versions of three Pressure Machine tracks, was released on March 25, 2022. "The Getting By II", "The Getting By V" and "Runaway Horses II" present a more upbeat sound, while "The Getting By III", "The Getting By IV", "West Hills II" and "West Hills III" feature downbeat reinterpretations of the original songs. "West Hills III" is a gospel rendition of the opening track. "Runaway Horses II" sees Phoebe Bridgers removed from the mix.

== Critical reception ==
Professional ratings
Aggregate scores
Source	Rating
AnyDecentMusic?	7.5/10
Metacritic	79/100
Review scores
Source	Rating
AllMusic	4/5 stars
Clash	8/10
The Guardian	4/5 stars
The Independent	3/5 stars
The Line of Best Fit	9/10
NME	4/5 stars
Paste	8.2/10
Pitchfork	6.6/10
Slant Magazine	4/5 stars
Sputnikmusic	5/5

Pressure Machine has received generally positive reviews from critics. At Metacritic, which assigns a normalized rating out of 100 to reviews from mainstream critics, the album has an average score of 79 out of 100, which indicates "generally favourable reviews" based on 22 reviews. Neil Z. Yeung of AllMusic considered the album's "matured focus on concept and mood [to save] the album from becoming an odd catalog misstep." Robin Murray of Clash felt that Pressure Machine "is perhaps the closest we've come to the emotional core of the group itself." Damien McCormick of The Guardian called the album "their best album in years" and an "uncharacteristically reflective album." Utah-based radio station KXRK praised the album for its authenticity in capturing life in rural Utah stating, "I think everyone from a small town in Utah and throughout the country will appreciate this spectacular gem. But make no mistake, it is blatantly local."

Helen Brown of The Independent was less positive stating, "Some of these lyrics would be better sold if Flowers could allow himself to stop the eyes-closed singing and adopt a conversational tone. A little more campfire crackle to his delivery would have helped lift these good short stories from the prettily glowing embers of forgettable and occasionally recycled melodies." Steven Loftin of The Line of Best Fit praised the album for being different from the bands' previous albums and stated, "Pressure Machine isn't made to compete with their jubilant, indie trenched past. It's made to be an honest portrayal of a life that, in its own desolate way, holds a white-hot shine to those that in turn hold it dear." NME's review stated regarding the album, "It's a homecoming of discreet intentions, not the pompous heroes return they're likely used to – the modesty and subtlety suits them."

Candace McDuffie of Paste felt that the "emotional turmoil [of the record] makes it a thrilling—and kind of frightful—experience from start to finish." Shaad D'Souza of Pitchfork was also critical, stating, "Pressure Machine rarely escapes Flowers' Brandon Flowers-ness: try as he might—and you do get the sense that he's trying so, so hard—his usual wide-tipped brush can't do justice to what should be finely detailed scenes." Sal Cinquemani of Slant Magazine was positive towards the album and called it "the band's most sonically restrained effort to date." Sputnikmusic praised the album stating, "It's almost unbelievable how much more profound, mature, and seamless all of the songwriting, lyrics, and symbolism is here compared to any prior Killers' outing. Clearly, the toll of the pandemic and the change in scenery to Brandon's hometown brought out the best in him, and in turn, the entire band."

== Accolades ==
Accolades for Pressure Machine
Publication	Accolade	Rank	Ref.
The Boston Globe	The 60 Best Albums of the Year	—N/a	
NME	The 50 Best Albums of 2021	30	
Slant Magazine	The 50 Best Albums of 2021	25	
Uproxx	The Best Albums of 2021	—N/a	

Pressure Machine was a finalist for the 2021 AML Award for lyrics.

== Track listing ==
All tracks are written by Brandon Flowers and Jonathan Rado, except where noted.

Pressure Machine track listing
No.	Title	Writer(s)	Length
1.	"West Hills"		5:42
2.	"Quiet Town"		4:45
3.	"Terrible Thing"	Flowers	3:52
4.	"Cody"	Flowers; Ronnie Vannucci Jr.; Rado	3:50
5.	"Sleepwalker"		4:27
6.	"Runaway Horses" (featuring Phoebe Bridgers)	Flowers	3:54
7.	"In the Car Outside"	Flowers; Dave Keuning; Rado	5:28
8.	"In Another Life"		3:45
9.	"Desperate Things"		5:16
10.	"Pressure Machine"	Flowers; Keuning; Rado	5:09
11.	"The Getting By"		5:09
Total length:			51:17

Pressure Machine (Abridged) track listing (omits spoken introductions)
No.	Title	Writer(s)	Length
1.	"West Hills"		5:08
2.	"Quiet Town"		4:16
3.	"Terrible Thing"	Flowers	3:56
4.	"Cody"	Flowers; Ronnie Vannucci Jr.; Rado	3:37
5.	"Sleepwalker"		4:04
6.	"Runaway Horses" (featuring Phoebe Bridgers)	Flowers	3:24
7.	"In the Car Outside"	Flowers; Dave Keuning; Rado	4:48
8.	"In Another Life"		3:13
9.	"Desperate Things"		5:21
10.	"Pressure Machine"	Flowers; Keuning; Rado	4:44
11.	"The Getting By"		3:48
Total length:			46:19

Pressure Machine (Deluxe) bonus tracks
No.	Title	Writer(s)	Length
12.	"The Getting By II" (featuring Lucius)		3:16
13.	"The Getting By III"		3:51
14.	"The Getting By IV"		3:18
15.	"The Getting By V"		3:25
16.	"Runaway Horses II"	Flowers	3:28
17.	"West Hills II"		3:50
18.	"West Hills III"		3:50
Total length:			76:15

Notes

- "West Hills III" is set to the Hymn tune Kingsfold as used in Hymns of The Church of Jesus Christ of Latter-day Saints as the tune for "If You Could Hie to Kolob" and in The English Hymnal as "I Heard the Voice of Jesus Say."

== Personnel ==
The Killers

- Brandon Flowers – vocals (all tracks), synthesizer (tracks 1–5, 7–8, 10), piano (tracks 1, 9)
- Ronnie Vannucci Jr. – drums (tracks 1–2, 4–5, 7–10), guitar (track 4)
- Dave Keuning – guitars (tracks 1, 4–8, 10), pedal steel (track 6)

Additional musicians

- Jonathan Rado – synthesizer (1–2, 4–5, 7–8, 10–11), piano (2, 4–6), bass (2, 4–5, 7–8, 10), guitars (1–9, 11), harmonica (3), mandolin (4–5), organ (4, 6)
- Rob Moose – strings (1, 6, 10–11)
- Gabriel Cabezas – cello (1, 6, 10–11)
- Sara Watkins – fiddle (1, 4, 10), violin (8)
- Joe Pug – harmonica (1–3), guitar (6)
- Anjolee Williams – background vocals (2)
- Charles "ChuckHeat" Henderson-McCrary – background vocals (2)
- Nate Walcott – trumpet (4)
- Matthew Davidson – pedal steel (5–6, 10)
- Griffin Goldsmith – background vocals (11)
- Taylor Goldsmith – background vocals (11)

Technical

- Jonathan Rado – producer (all tracks), recording engineer (5, 10)
- Shawn Everett – producer, mixer, recording engineer
- Chris Allgood – mastering engineer
- Emily Lazar – mastering engineer
- Jed Jones – recording engineer (1–2, 4–5, 7–9)
- Matt Breunig – recording engineer (1–2, 4, 7, 9)
- Will Maclellan – recording engineer (1–8, 10–11)
- Alec Eitram – recording engineer (2, 4, 8, 11)
- Raoul Ahmad – recording engineer (2, 4, 8, 11)
- Robert Root – recording engineer (4, 10)
- Rias Reed – recording engineer (5, 8, 10)

== Charts ==
=== Weekly charts ===
Weekly chart performance for Pressure Machine
Chart (2021)	Peak position
Australian Albums (ARIA)	6
Austrian Albums (Ö3 Austria)	5
Belgian Albums (Ultratop Flanders)	8
Belgian Albums (Ultratop Wallonia)	16
Canadian Albums (Billboard)	31
Dutch Albums (Album Top 100)	17
Finnish Albums (Suomen virallinen lista)	45
German Albums (Offizielle Top 100)	7
Irish Albums (Official Charts)	6
New Zealand Albums (RMNZ)	18
Portuguese Albums (AFP)	50
Scottish Albums (Official Charts)	1
Spanish Albums (Promusicae)	14
Swiss Albums (Schweizer Hitparade)	4
UK Albums (Official Charts)	1
US Billboard 200	9
US Top Alternative Albums (Billboard)	2
US Top Rock Albums (Billboard)	1
US Americana/Folk Albums (Billboard)	1

=== Year-end charts ===
Year-end chart performance for Pressure Machine
Chart (2021)	Position
US Top Rock Albums (Billboard)	96
US Top Alternative Albums (Billboard)	50
