= Fire in Bone =

Promotional single by the Killers

from the album Imploding the Mirage
- Released: April 24, 2020
- Genre: Synthpop
- Length: 3:53
- Label: Island
- Songwriters: Brandon Flowers; Mark Stoermer; Ronnie Vannucci Jr.; Stuart Price
- Producers: Jonathan Rado; Price; Shawn Everett

Visualizer video
- "Fire in Bone" on YouTube

"Fire in Bone" is a song by American rock band the Killers, as the sixth track from their sixth studio album, Imploding the Mirage (2020). It was released on April 24, 2020, as the first promotional single from the album. A visualizer video was released the same day.

== Background and release ==
"Fire in Bone" was announced by the Killers on social media on April 21, 2020. According to frontman Brandon Flowers, "Fire in Bone" is one of the band's "favorite album tracks." In an interview with Mormon-based podcast The Foyer, Flowers said the song was "so beautiful. It's just... it just transcends... we did this record with two producers, Shawn Everett and Jonathan Rado... And it's just so, it just touches your heart." Flowers also remarked how he's "been lucky enough to have that experience a lot in my life. I’m grateful and I’m thankful for it, but it reminded me of the first album [Hot Fuss], when those moments happened a lot" in an interview to NME.

The song was written by the then-three members of the Killers, Flowers, Mark Stoermer, and Ronnie Vannucci Jr., as well as producer Stuart Price, known for producing most of the Killers' third studio album Day & Age, as well as Brandon Flowers' debut solo album Flamingo. The song was produced by Price, as well as Jonathan Rado and Shawn Everett, who produced the rest of Imploding the Mirage. "Fire in Bone" is the only song to be produced by Price on the album.

The cover artwork is "Two Peacocks" by American artist Thomas Blackshear.

"Fire in Bone" was released on April 24, 2020, on streaming services as well as CD in Europe. Brandon Flowers later praised the song, saying "[i]t winks at you and you’re hooked. You just want to chase it."

== Reception ==
"Fire in Bone" received positive reviews from critics. Sam Sodomsky from Pitchfork called the song "a pitch-perfect ’80s tempest—an exquisitely layered Thomas Dolby-style funhouse [song]" before adding on that Flowers sings "straight from the heart, eyes closed, arms outstretched" in the final chorus. Bethany Carter of Redbrick Magazine remarked that "the sheer genius of creating a song with such a spirited melody and simplistic lyrics is what makes the track feel alive." Christopher Connor of Indie is not a Genre praised the song for "its distinctive chiming guitars and there is definitely more than a hint of Bruce Springsteen to be found, both in the beat and lyricisms" and rated the song 3.5 stars. Rolling Stone Magazine described it as a "quirky, funky new track."

== Credits and personnel ==
Credits adapted from the liner notes of the deluxe edition of Imploding the Mirage.

=== Studios ===
- Subtle McNugget Studios (Los Angeles) – recording, mixing
- Electro-Vox Recording Studios (Los Angeles) – recording
- Battle Born Studios (Las Vegas) – recording
- The Lodge (New York City) – mastering

=== Personnel ===
==== The Killers ====
- Brandon Flowers – vocals, synth
- Ronnie Vannucci Jr. – drums, guitar
- Mark Stoermer – Bass VI

==== Additional personnel ====
- Jonathan Rado – string synth, acoustics, harmonica, Fairlight
- Stuart Price – synths, guitar, bass

=== Technical ===
- Jonathan Rado – production
- Shawn Everett – production, recording, mixing
- Ivan Wayman – engineering
- Robert Root – engineering
- Stuart Price – production
- Alan Moulder – mixing
- Emily Lazar – mastering

== Charts ==
| Chart (2020) | Peak position |
|---|---|
| US Hot Rock & Alternative Songs (Billboard) | 27 |

== Release history ==
| Region | Date | Format | Label | Ref. |
|---|---|---|---|---|
| Various | April 24, 2020 | Digital download; streaming | Island | |
