= Steelhouse Omaha =

Live music venue in Omaha, Nebraska, U.S.

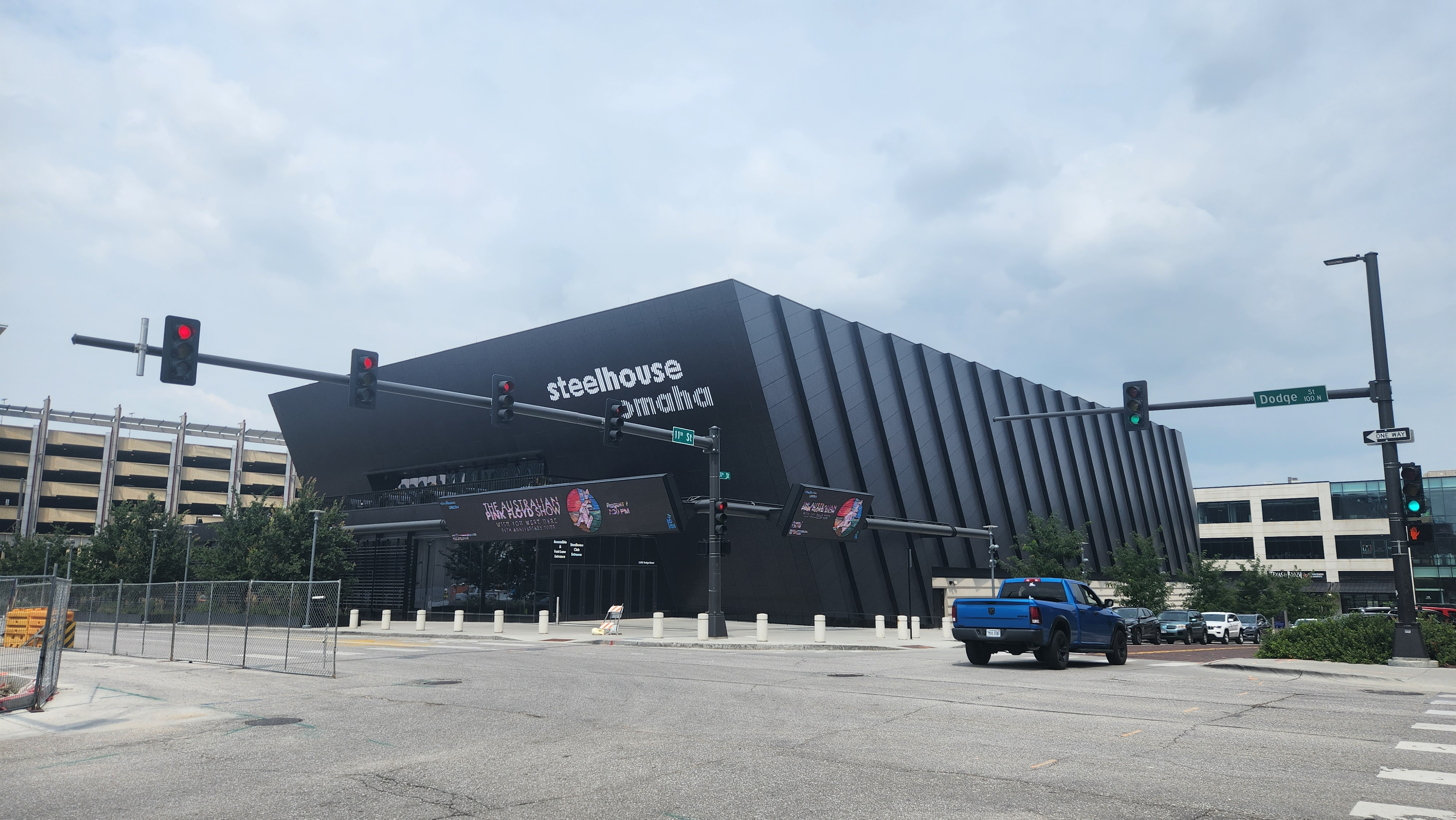
- Steelhouse in 2025
- Interactive map of Steelhouse Omaha
- Address: 1100 Dodge St,.Omaha, Nebraska, United States
- Coordinates: 41.260232234791175°N 95.93103136984783°W
- Owner: Omaha Performing Arts
- Operator: Omaha Performing Arts
- Capacity: 3,000
- Type: Live music venue

Construction
- Built: 2020–2023
- Opened: May 12, 2023
- Architect: Ennead Architects
- Main contractors: Kiewit Corporation

Website
- steelhouseomaha.com

Steelhouse Omaha is a live music venue located in Downtown Omaha, Nebraska, United States. The venue began construction in 2020 and opened on May 12, 2023.

== History ==
In November 2019, Omaha Performing Arts announced a $109 million live music venue with a capacity of 1,500 to 3,000 to be built in Downtown Omaha. Many bands and artists previously avoided the Omaha–Council Bluffs metropolitan area because it lacked an appropriate performance venue of this size. Construction began in 2020, with groundbreaking beginning a year later. At the groundbreaking ceremony, the venue was officially named Steelhouse Omaha. Steelhouse Omaha officially opened on 12 May 2023. The first concert was The Killers.

== Design ==
Steelhouse Omaha is a charcoal-colored building with a sawtooth rhythm design on the exterior. This is meant to represent the manufacturing of steel. The building was designed by Ennead Architects and was built by Kiewit Corporation. Ennead also designed the nearby Holland Performing Arts Center, which is also owned by Omaha Performing Arts. Steelhouse Omaha has a maximum capacity of 2,700 people on the floor and an additional 300 people on the balcony.
