= Imploding the Mirage =

2020 studio album by the Killers

Studio album by the Killers
- Released: August 21, 2020
- Studio: Sound City (Los Angeles); Subtle McNugget (Los Angeles); Electro-Vox (Los Angeles); Battle Born (Las Vegas)
- Genre: Heartland rock; pop rock; alternative rock; synth-pop
- Length: 41:58
- Label: Island
- Producer: Jonathan Rado; Shawn Everett; Stuart Price; Ariel Rechtshaid

The Killers chronology
Wonderful Wonderful (2017)	Imploding the Mirage (2020)	Pressure Machine (2021)

Singles from Imploding the Mirage
- 1. "Caution" Released: March 12, 2020; 2. "My Own Soul's Warning" Released: June 17, 2020; 3. "Dying Breed" Released: August 14, 2020

Imploding the Mirage is the sixth studio album by American rock band the Killers, released on August 21, 2020, by Island Records in the United States and internationally by EMI. To date, it is the band's only album without lead guitarist Dave Keuning, who took an indefinite hiatus (ending in 2021) from the band in 2017. Guitar parts are covered by Killers bassist Mark Stoermer, producer Jonathan Rado, and a variety of guest musicians, including Lindsey Buckingham (Fleetwood Mac) and Adam Granduciel (The War on Drugs).

The album was preceded by the lead single "Caution" released on March 12, 2020, followed by the second single "My Own Soul's Warning" on June 17, 2020, and the third single "Dying Breed" on August 14, 2020. "Fire in Bone" was released as a promotional single on April 24, 2020.

The album was originally intended for release on May 29, 2020, but was delayed to August as a result of the COVID-19 pandemic.

The pandemic also led to the postponement of the world tour in support of the album, originally intended to begin in the UK in May 2020. After multiple delays, the tour eventually began in Las Vegas in April 2022, running until December 2023.

== Background ==
The band formally announced the album on social media on November 15, 2019. Frontman Brandon Flowers told NME that the band went to Utah to record part of the album as it was where Flowers "fell in love with music for the first time", also saying that it was "interesting to be there again and hear some of that music with the geography matching the sensation. Some of that stuff is starting to resurface and a lot of that had to do with synthesizer music. It's always been part of our DNA but it's definitely creeping up."

== Recording ==
Imploding the Mirage was recorded in various locations, including in Los Angeles, Las Vegas and Park City, Utah, and produced by Canadian producer Shawn Everett, and Jonathan Rado of the band Foxygen. The duo pushed the Killers to think beyond what people might expect of them. Drummer Ronnie Vannucci noted: "It kind of felt uncomfortable in a really special way, I remember thinking, 'I don't know what's going to happen and I like it.'"

The album is the band's first not to feature founding guitarist Dave Keuning, who took a step back from the band in a touring and recording capacity following the release of their previous studio album, Wonderful Wonderful (2017). Flowers and Vannucci reached out to Keuning to rejoin them in the studio to record Imploding the Mirage: "When we started working the schedule out, we asked [Dave] if it worked for him and he was like, 'Maybe, I don't know'. Well, we're going to go ahead and do this because we feel good and we feel creative. Let's strike. We didn't really hear from him, except when it came to making a video. He was like, 'If you guys want me in the video…' Well, I'm not sure that makes any sense either! Video? How about some guitar?" Flowers elaborated: "He's just happy to be in San Diego and doesn't really want to venture out of there. If he comes for a week and we don't tap into the universe, that frustrates him a lot. He's kind of just spending time with his family and I think he's content doing that right now." The following year, Keuning discussed his own reasons for not taking part in the recording sessions: "I just needed a break from everything. [Imploding the Mirage] was probably just as busy of a schedule as touring for ten or eleven months. That record took a long time to record. I feel like it took a year and a half. Only they would know, but I feel like it took a while. I just... we were kind of at a stalemate. [...] If it was recorded in San Diego, I probably could have been a part of it. I wasn't ready to work out of Vegas or Utah for a year and a half."

Bass guitarist Mark Stoermer, who has been on touring hiatus from the band since 2016, contributed both bass and guitar to the album. Regarding Stoermer's involvement, Vannucci noted: "Mark's awesome in so many ways. We'd tell [Dave and Mark], 'This is the schedule, we're renting a house for six months, come out, whenever you want, we're there every day'. Mark came out to the house one time and to Los Angeles and it was great. It was on his own terms and was very productive. He played bass on some songs, played guitar on some songs, and even though he wasn't in the room we'd send him mixes and he'd be involved."

The album features contributions from Lindsey Buckingham ("Caution"), k.d. lang ("Lightning Fields"), Weyes Blood ("My God"), Adam Granduciel from the War on Drugs ("Blowback"), Blake Mills ("Caution") and Lucius ("Caution" and "My God").

== Composition ==
Musically, Imploding the Mirage has been described as heartland rock, pop rock, alternative rock, synth-pop, pop, arena rock, new wave, and synth-rock.

After contributing to five songs on the band's fifth studio album, Wonderful Wonderful, Australian musician and songwriter Alex Cameron returned to co-write three tracks on Imploding the Mirage.

== Artwork ==
The album cover is Dance of the Wind and Storm by American artist Thomas Blackshear. The album's artwork was decided upon during the recording process and became a source of visual inspiration in the studio, with Flowers noting: "They just look like gods. I just started to see a path open up in what these two people could represent for me. We blew up terrible lo-res versions of them and stuck them up in the studio. I would go to them when I needed help with lyrics and when we needed help with sonics, or [to decide] which songs were making the record. [The artwork] became a member of the band. There are direct lines that will just take you to the painting."

== Promotion ==
=== Live performances ===
The Killers performed tracks from the album live for CBS This Morning, The Ellen DeGeneres Show, Jimmy Kimmel Live!, The Tonight Show Starring Jimmy Fallon, The Late Show with Stephen Colbert, and Good Morning America.

The band also appeared on the covers of NME and Music Week.

=== Singles ===
The lead single, "Caution", was released on March 12, 2020, and reached number one on Billboard's Alternative Airplay and Rock Airplay charts. "Fire in Bone" was released as a promotional single on April 24, 2020. The second single, "My Own Soul's Warning", was released on June 17, 2020 and reached the top ten on Billboard's Alternative Airplay and Rock Airplay charts. The third single, "Dying Breed", was released on August 14, 2020, a week before the album was released.

=== Deluxe edition ===
The band released a deluxe edition of the album on January 29, 2021, featuring live, stripped-back versions of "Caution" and "Blowback", as well as the new song "C'est La Vie".

== Critical reception ==
Professional ratings
Aggregate scores
Source	Rating
AnyDecentMusic?	7.2/10
Metacritic	76/100
Review scores
Source	Rating
AllMusic	4.5/5 stars
Consequence of Sound	B
DIY	4/5 stars
Gigwise	7/10 stars
The Guardian	3/5 stars
The Independent	3/5 stars
The Irish Times	3/5 stars
The Line of Best Fit	8.5/10
NME	5/5 stars
Pitchfork	7.4/10

Imploding the Mirage received generally positive reviews from critics. At Metacritic, which assigns a normalized rating out of 100 to reviews from mainstream critics, the album has a score of 76 out of 100, which indicates "generally favorable reviews" based on 22 reviews. AllMusic's Neil Z. Yeung stated that "the Killers strike gold" on the album, writing that it is "more than just one of their best albums, but a triumphant and invigorated rut-reversal that shines with a hard-won confidence." DIY's Sarah Jamieson called the album "rich and invigorating" and stated that it "proves they're still one of our most treasured bands for a reason". Writing for NME, Mark Beaumont called the album "a raised fist to the future" and "another dazzling statement of ultra-modern pomp, and one arguably even more in step with new generations of alt-rock" in a five-star review.

== Accolades ==
Accolades for Imploding the Mirage
Publication	Accolade	Rank	Ref.
Billboard	Fans Favorite Rock Album of 2020	1	
Billboard	The 25 Best Rock Albums of 2020: Staff Picks	21	
NME	The 50 best albums of 2020	19	
Mic	Favorite albums of 2020	8	
San Francisco Examiner	Top 10 rock albums of 2020	6	
The Yorkshire Post	Albums of 2020	10	
The Forty-Five	The 45 best albums of 2020	21	
Chorus.fm	Top 30 Albums of 2020	26	
Radio X	The best albums of 2020	—N/a	
AllMusic	Favorite Rock Albums	—N/a	
The Sunday Times	The best albums of 2020	—N/a	
Vulture	The Best Albums of 2020	—N/a	
The Irish News	Best albums of 2020	—N/a	
Good Morning America	50 best albums of 2020	38	
NPR	NPR Listeners Top Albums of 2020	42	
411Mania	The Top 100 Albums of 2020	43	
Uproxx	Indiecastie's Comeback of the Year	—N/a	

Pitchfork ranked "Caution" the 94th best song of 2020.

Uproxx listed "My Own Soul's Warning" as the 5th best song of 2020. NME listed it as the 14th best song of 2020.

== Commercial performance ==
Imploding the Mirage debuted at number eight on the US Billboard 200 (and number one on the US Billboard Rock Albums chart), earning 37,000 album-equivalent units (including 30,000 pure album sales) in its first week. In the United Kingdom, it debuted atop the UK Albums Chart with first-week sales of 50,391 copies, becoming the third fastest-selling album of the year so far (behind Lady Gaga's Chromatica and Kylie Minogue's Disco). It also marks the Killers' sixth consecutive UK chart-topper and Flowers' eighth. The album also topped the ARIA Albums Chart in Australia.

== Track listing ==
All tracks are produced by Jonathan Rado and Shawn Everett, except where noted.

Imploding the Mirage track listing
No.	Title	Writer(s)	Producer(s)	Length
1.	"My Own Soul's Warning"	Brandon Flowers		4:34
2.	"Blowback"	Flowers; Everett; Rado; Ronnie Vannucci Jr.		3:59
3.	"Dying Breed"	Flowers; Rado; Mike Crossey; Alex Cameron; Klause J. Dinger; Michael Rother; Michael Karoli; Jaki Liebezeit; Irmin Schmidt; Holger Schuering; Kenji Suzuki		4:05
4.	"Caution"	Flowers; Mark Stoermer; Vannucci; Cameron; Everett; Rado		4:29
5.	"Lightning Fields" (featuring k.d. lang)	Flowers; Vannucci; Everett; Rado		4:18
6.	"Fire in Bone"	Flowers; Stoermer; Vannucci; Stuart Price	Everett; Price; Rado	3:53
7.	"Running Towards a Place"	Flowers; Vannucci; Ariel Rechtshaid; Tommy King	Rechtshaid; Everett; Rado	4:13
8.	"My God" (featuring Weyes Blood)	Flowers; Everett; Natalie Mering; Rado		3:38
9.	"When the Dreams Run Dry"	Flowers; Rado; Cameron		4:42
10.	"Imploding the Mirage"	Flowers; Rado		4:07
Total length:				41:58

Deluxe edition bonus tracks
No.	Title	Writer(s)	Length
11.	"C'est La Vie"	Flowers; Rado; Everett; Cameron; Guy Wood; Robert Mellin; Dino Geangelo; Stoermer	3:05
12.	"Caution" (Wasatch Style)	Flowers; Stoermer; Vannucci; Cameron; Everett; Rado	3:17
13.	"Blowback" (acoustic)	Flowers; Everett; Rado; Vannucci	3:29
Total length:			51:49

=== Notes ===
- "Blowback" contains samples from "Your Love", performed by Frankie Knuckles and Jamie Principle.
- "Dying Breed" contains excerpts from "Hallogallo", performed by Neu!, and "Moonshake", performed by Can.

== Personnel ==
Credits adapted from the liner notes of Imploding the Mirage.

=== The Killers ===
- Brandon Flowers – vocals (all tracks); synth (tracks 1–8, 10); organ (tracks 1, 5); glockenspiel (track 1); marimba synth (track 9); guitar (track 10)
- Ronnie Vannucci Jr. – drums (all tracks); percussion (tracks 1, 4); guitar (tracks 6, 7); tympani (tracks 8, 10); marimba (track 10)
- Mark Stoermer – guitar (tracks 3, 4, 7, 9); bass (track 4); E-Bow (track 5); Bass VI (track 6)

=== Additional musicians ===
- Bobby Lee Parker – guitar (track 1)
- Jonathan Rado – bass (tracks 1–3, 5, 7, 9, 10); organ, cello (track 1); guitar (tracks 1, 5, 7, 10); string synth (tracks 1, 4, 6, 7); piano (tracks 1–3, 7, 10); slide guitar (tracks 2–4); acoustics (tracks 2, 6); E-Bow (tracks 2, 3, 9); harmonica (tracks 2, 3, 6, 10); 12-string (tracks 3, 7); celeste (track 3); acoustic guitar (tracks 3, 4, 8, 9); synth (tracks 3, 9, 10); drones (track 4); Emulator, horns, bagpipes (track 5); Fairlight (tracks 6, 8); fretless bass (track 8); Linn (track 9); marimba, vibraphone (track 10)
- Rob Moose – strings (track 1)
- Roger Joseph Manning Jr. – keys (track 1)
- Brian D'Addario – acoustic guitar (track 1)
- Shawn Everett – programming (track 2); drones (track 3); Emulator (track 9)
- Natalie Mering – outro vocals (track 2); additional vocals (track 5); chorus and bridge vocals (track 8); vocals (track 10)
- Adam Granduciel – keys, FX manipulation (track 2)
- Lindsey Buckingham – guitar (track 4)
- Blake Mills – guitar, bass, Bass VI (track 4)
- Lucius – background vocals (tracks 4, 8)
- k.d. lang – vocals (track 5)
- Drew Erickson – piano (track 5); strings (track 8)
- Stuart Price – synths, guitar, bass (track 6)
- Benji Lysaght – guitar (track 7)
- Ariel Rechtshaid – guitar, bass, Linn (track 7)
- Tommy King – synth, pan flute (track 7)

=== Technical ===
- Jonathan Rado – production (all tracks)
- Shawn Everett – production, recording, mixing (all tracks)
- Ivan Wayman – engineering (tracks 1, 2, 4–10)
- Robert Root – engineering (tracks 1, 2, 4–10)
- Ariel Rechtshaid – mixing (tracks 1, 3, 7); production (track 7)
- Dave Shiffman – mixing (tracks 3, 7)
- Flood – mixing (track 3)
- Stuart Price – production (track 6)
- Alan Moulder – mixing (track 10)
- Emily Lazar – mastering (all tracks)

=== Artwork ===
- Brandon Flowers – art direction
- Joe Spix – art direction, design
- Sandy Brummels – art direction
- Thomas Blackshear II – paintings

=== Studios ===
- Subtle McNugget Studios (Los Angeles) – recording, mixing (all tracks)
- Electro-Vox Recording Studios (Los Angeles) – recording (all tracks)
- Battle Born Studios (Las Vegas) – recording (all tracks)
- Effie Street Studios (Los Angeles) – mixing (tracks 1, 3, 7, 10)
- Assault and Battery 1 (London) – mixing (track 3)
- Ariel's Studio – mixing (track 3)
- The Lodge (New York City) – mastering (all tracks)

== Charts ==
=== Weekly charts ===
Weekly chart performance for Imploding the Mirage
Chart (2020)	Peak position
Australian Albums (ARIA)	1
Austrian Albums (Ö3 Austria)	4
Belgian Albums (Ultratop Flanders)	4
Belgian Albums (Ultratop Wallonia)	15
Canadian Albums (Billboard)	9
Dutch Albums (Album Top 100)	16
Finnish Albums (Suomen virallinen lista)	50
French Albums (SNEP)	98
German Albums (Offizielle Top 100)	6
Irish Albums (OCC)	1
Italian Albums (FIMI)	54
Japanese Albums (Oricon)	107
Lithuanian Albums (AGATA)	97
New Zealand Albums (RMNZ)	4
Norwegian Albums (VG-lista)	22
Portuguese Albums (AFP)	33
Scottish Albums (OCC)	1
Spanish Albums (Promusicae)	15
Swedish Albums (Sverigetopplistan)	44
Swiss Albums (Schweizer Hitparade)	2
UK Albums (OCC)	1
US Billboard 200	8
US Top Alternative Albums (Billboard)	2
US Top Rock Albums (Billboard)	1

=== Year-end charts ===
Year-end chart performance for Imploding the Mirage
Chart (2020)	Position
UK Albums (OCC)	53
US Top Alternative Albums (Billboard)	48
US Top Rock Albums (Billboard)	80

== Certifications ==
Certifications for Imploding the Mirage
Region	Certification	Certified units/sales
United Kingdom (BPI)	Gold	100,000^{‡}
^{‡} Sales+streaming figures based on certification alone.

== See also ==
- List of number-one albums of 2020 (Australia)
- List of UK Albums Chart number ones of the 2020s
