= Thomas Blackshear =

African-American artist

Thomas Blackshear II
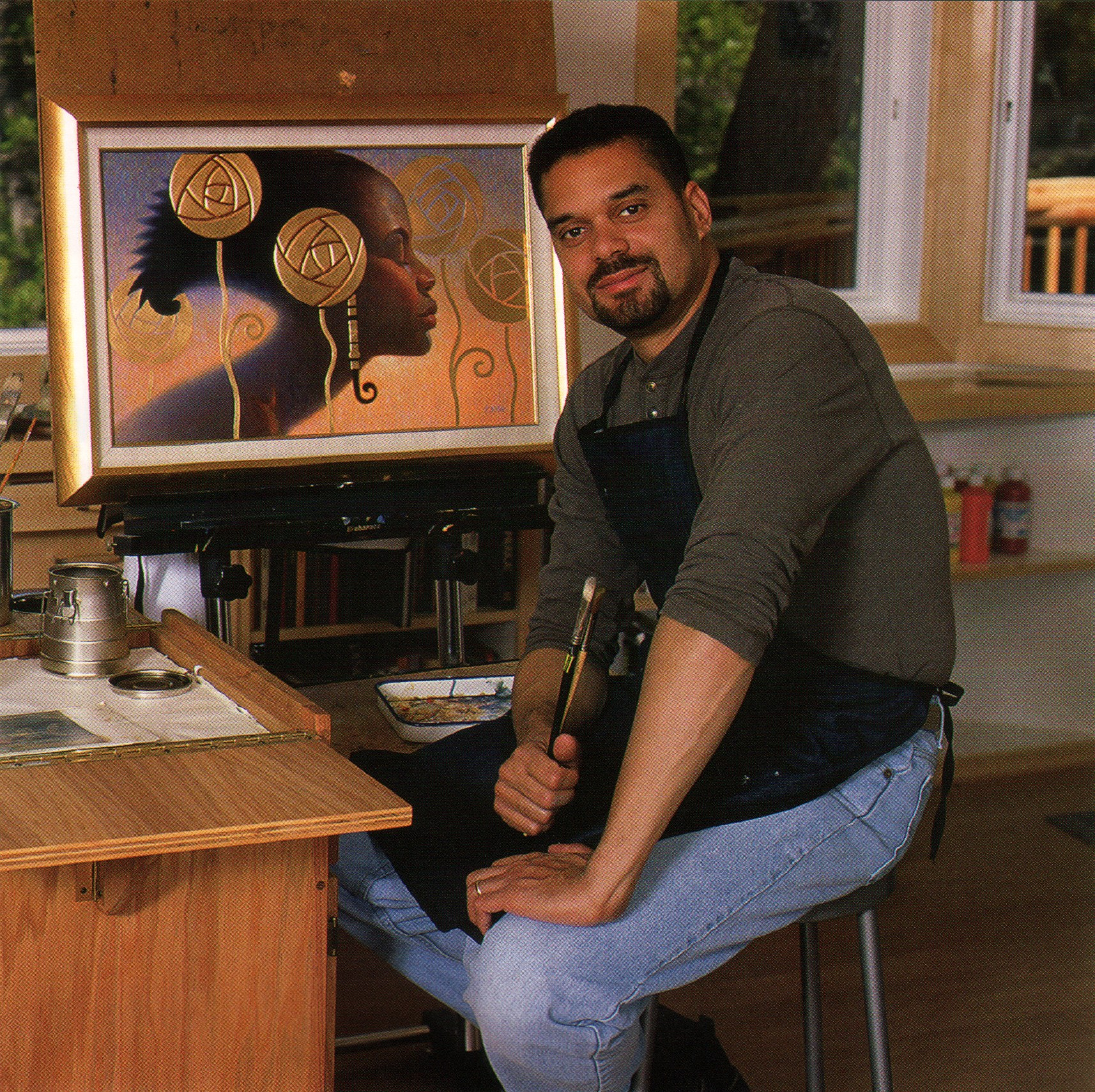
- Thomas Blackshear II at work in his studio
- Born: Thomas Richman Blackshear II; November 14, 1955 (age 70); Waco, Texas, United States
- Occupation: Artist
- Years active: 1987-present

Thomas Richman Blackshear II (born November 14, 1955) is an American artist whose paintings adorn many Evangelical churches. He is also a sculptor and a designer of stamps and ornaments, often with African American, Indigenous American, and/or Western themes.

== Early life ==
Blackshear was born in Waco, Texas. He grew up in Atlanta, Georgia. He attended the Art Institute of Chicago and then American Academy of Art in Chicago.

After his 1977 graduation from the American Academy of Art, Blackshear worked for Hallmark Cards for one year.

== Career ==
Blackshear designs have been a featured in the Smithsonian, museum collections, postage stamps and music albums.

Blackshear's illustrations for numerous postage stamps have issued by the United States Postal Service (USPS).

Black Heritage series, initiated in 1978:

1. Jean Baptiste Point du Sable – 22¢ – issued February 20, 1987 (Scott 2249)
2. James W. Johnson – 22¢ – issued February 2, 1988 (Scott 2371)
3. Asa Philip Randolph – 25¢ – issued February 3, 1989 (Scott 2402)
4. Ida B. Wells – 25¢ – issued February 1, 1990 (Scott 2442)
5. Dorothy Height – 49¢ (Forever stamp) – issued February 2, 2017—in conjunction with Lateef Mangum (Scott 474304)

Single:

6. Joe Louis – 29¢ – issued June 22, 1993

Legends of American Music, Jazz Musicians series: Ten single 32¢ stamps issued September 16, 1995. The production was designed by Dean Mitchell and illustrated by Blackshear.

7. Eubie Blake
8. Jelly Roll Morton
9. James P. Johnson
10. Erroll Garner
11. Thelonious Monk
12. Coleman Hawkins
13. Charlie Parker
14. John Coltrane
15. Louis Armstrong
16. Charles Mingus

Hollywood's Golden Era Movie series: Four stamps, printed in one block, were dedicated March 23, 1990, in Hollywood as a prelude to the 62nd Academy Awards. 1990 marked the 50th anniversary of each film's having received nominations in 1939 for the 1940 Academy Awards. Each stamp resembles a miniature movie poster. Clockwise from the upper left:

17. The Wizard of Oz
18. Gone with the Wind
19. Stagecoach
20. Beau Geste

Classic Movie Monsters: Five movie monsters issued September 30, 1997, in a pane of twenty 32¢ stamps. The selvage contains a photograph of each actor and his signature. The production was designed by Derry Noyes (whose father is the late architect Eliot Noyes) and illustrated by Blackshear.

21. Bela Lugosi as Dracula
22. Lon Chaney as The Phantom of the Opera
23. Lon Chaney, Jr., as The Wolf Man
24. Boris Karloff as The Mummy
25. Boris Karloff as Frankenstein's monster

Stars of stage and screen

26. James Cagney – single – 33¢ – issued July 22, 1999 (designed by Howard Paine, illustrated by Blackshear)

Literary Arts:

27. James Baldwin – single – 37¢ – issued June 24, 2004

Nobel Peace Prize / humanitarian

28. Mother Teresa – issued September 5, 2010

A touring exhibit of his Black Heritage works premiered in 1992 at the Smithsonian Institution's National Museum of American History. Blackshear also illustrated the USPS book I Have A Dream: A Collection of Black Americans on U.S. Postage Stamps (1991).

Multiple pieces of Blackshear's artwork serve as the cover art for American rock band The Killers's sixth studio album Imploding the Mirage (2020) and its singles. Blackshear's original oil paintings in the Western Nouveau genre similar to “Dance of the Wind and Storm” and the other pieces used for The Killers's album can be found at the Broadmoor Galleries in Colorado Springs. Blackshear also created video game box art, including Karateka (1984).

Blackshear's oil painting Forgiven (1991) is in the collection of the Museum of Biblical Art, Dallas. His oil painting Now What? (2008) is in the collection of the Booth Western Art Museum. Blackshear's paintings are often featured at the National Cowboy & Western Heritage Museum.

== Personal life ==
Blackshear and his wife, Ami Beth Smith, met through the American Academy of Art College, Chicago. The couple have one son and reside in Colorado Springs, Colorado.

Blackshear has been a Christian since he was a young man. He credits his marriage and artistic success to God, "So many things that have come my way during my career are blessings from God."

== Works and publications ==
- Blackshear, Thomas (1993). The African American Tradition: Heroes of Our Heritages. Trumbull, CT: Greenwich Workshop, Inc. OCLC 34829260.
- Blackshear, Thomas (painting by); Lessin, Roy (heart reflections written by) (1996). Forgiven: A Collection. Colorado Springs, CO: Chariot Victor Publications. ISBN 978-1-884-00988-4. OCLC 883406076.

== Awards and honors ==
- 2020 Society of Illustrators Hall of Fame
- Distinguished Alumnus Award from the American Academy of Art in Chicago in 2013.
- Artist Choice Award at the Gene Autry Masters of the West Show in 2018.
- James R. Parks Trustees Purchase Award for the painting “Wild West Show!” in 2019.
- Express Ranches Great American Cowboy Award for the painting “Two Americans of the Old West” at the Prix de West in 2022.
- Prix de West Purchase Award for the painting “A Much Needed Break” in 2024.
- Artist Excellence Award sponsored by Art of the West magazine in 2024.
