= Electro-Vox Recording Studios =

Recording studio in Hollywood, Los Angeles

- Interactive map of Electro-Vox Recording Studios
- Address: 5546 Melrose Ave, Los Angeles, CA 90038
- Coordinates: 34°4′59.916″N 118°19′17.256″W
- Owner: Woody Jackson
- Type: Recording studio

Construction
- Opened: 1931

Website
- electro-vox.com

Electro-Vox Recording Studios (or simply Vox) is a recording studio formerly in Hollywood, Los Angeles, California, United States. It was historically located on Melrose Avenue across from the Paramount Pictures gate. In 2009 it was purchased by American musician Woody Jackson.

In a 2021 interview with GQ, musician Adam Granduciel of The War on Drugs, which recorded at Electro-Vox in 2019, said that the studio had since closed down. According to Jackson's website, his studio is now located in Tucson, Arizona.

== See also ==
- Category:Albums recorded at Electro-Vox Recording Studios
