= Day & Age World Tour =

2008–2010 tour by the Killers

- Tour by The Killers
- Poster announcing a show in London
- Location: North America; Europe; Oceania; South America; Africa; Asia
- Associated album: Day & Age
- Start date: October 20, 2008
- End date: February 21, 2010
- Legs: 12
- No. of shows: 66 in North America; 53 in Europe; 7 in Oceania; 5 in South America; 3 in Africa; 1 in Asia; Total: 135

The Killers concert chronology
- Sam's Town Tour (2006–2007); Day & Age World Tour (2008–2010); Battle Born World Tour (2012-2014)

The Day & Age World Tour was the third major concert tour by American rock band the Killers. The tour took place between 2008 and 2010 in support of the band's third studio album Day & Age, released in November 2008. The tour started on October 20, 2008 at the House of Blues on the Las Vegas Strip, and ended on February 21, 2010 at Flemington Racecourse in Melbourne, playing over 100 shows in just over a year. The Day & Age World Tour saw the Killers' record their first live album, Live from the Royal Albert Hall, at the Royal Albert Hall in London during their third European leg of the tour, as well as the band's first performances in Africa in December 2009.

== Background ==
The Day & Age World Tour started with a string of "warm-up shows" at smaller, intimate venues in North America and Europe throughout late 2008, including a headlining date at the Royal Albert Hall in November, and three Christmas festivals in December. Tickets for the shows went on sale in late September and quickly sold out. The tour proper was announced on October 28, 2008, with three planned legs for the tour having tickets released on the same day.

The first "warm-up show" of the Day & Age World Tour took place at the House of Blues in Las Vegas on October 20, 2008, with songs such as "Human", "Losing Touch", and "Joy Ride" had their full-concert live debut at the show, while songs "Spaceman" and "Neon Tiger" had their live debuts at a fan-club only show at the Hammerstein Ballroom in New York four months prior. The band played ten more warm-up shows from October to December, including Christmas festivals Deck the Hall Ball on December 9, Not So Silent Night on December 11, and Almost Acoustic Christmas on December 14.

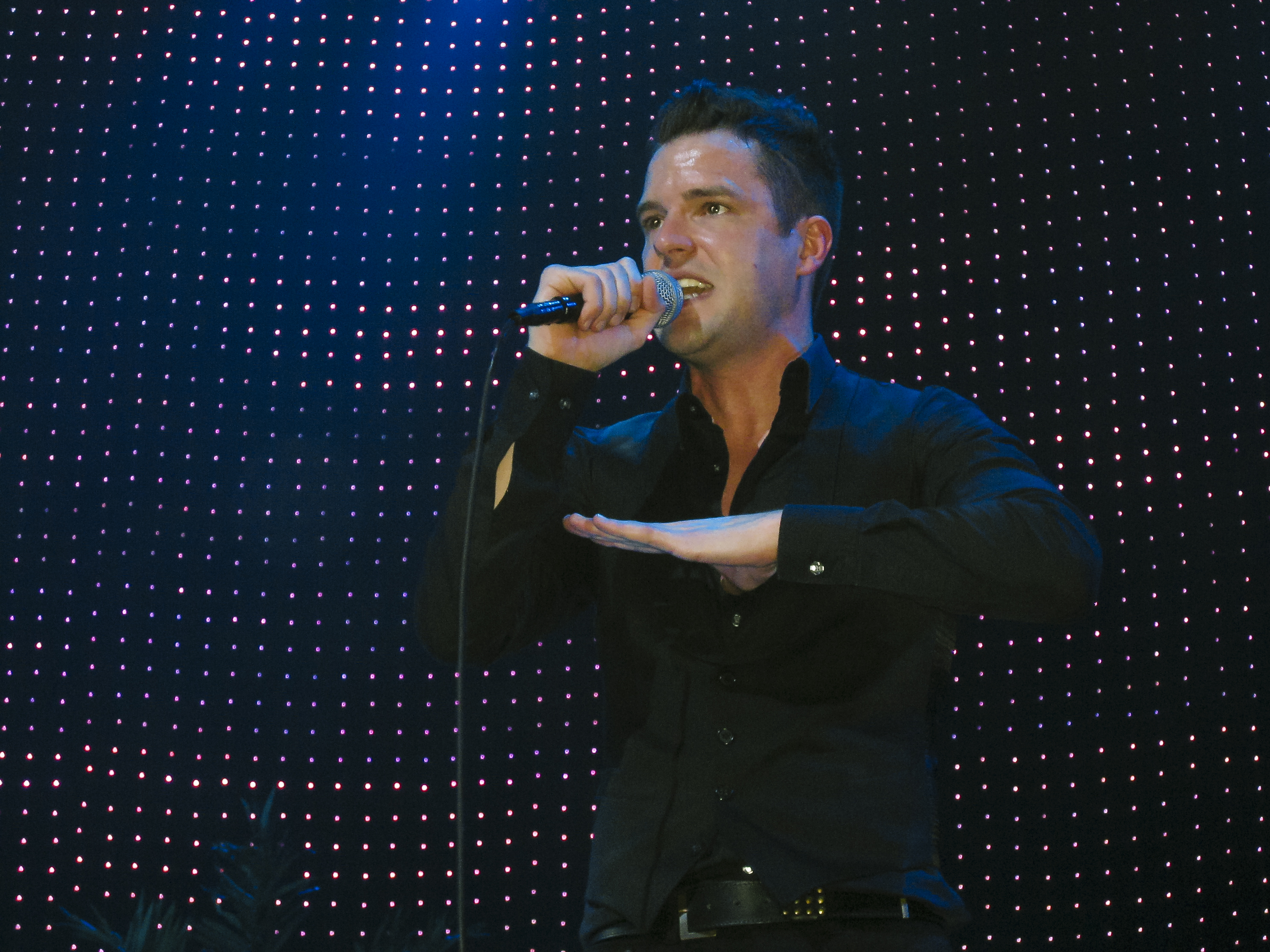
Frontman Brandon Flowers performing on the Day & Age World Tour in February 2009

The Day & Age World Tour proper began on January 16, 2009 at the Fox Theatre in Boulder, Colorado, with the live debut of songs such as "A Dustland Fairytale", "The World We Live In", and "This is Your Life". The first North American leg of the tour lasted throughout January and early February with French electric group M83 opening for the band.

The band then embarked on the first European leg of the tour, with Louis XIV opening for the Killers, only in the United Kingdom and Ireland, whose tickets sold out in less than a day in October. The leg started with a performance at the War Child beneficiary concert alongside Coldplay and lasted throughout February and March. The Killers and Louis XIV continued around mainland Europe throughout March as a part of the second European leg.

The Killers headlined the V Festival around different parts of Australia as a part of the four-day festival in March and April, celebrating guitarist Dave Keuning's birthday on the first day of the festival. The band then returned to North America in April and May, headling the Coachella Festival in mid-April, with Wild Light and Chairlift opening for the band on other dates.

After a string of European arena festival dates, as well as headlining Lollapalooza in August, the band returned to North America with a plethora of shows around the United States and Canada, with bands such as Wolfmother, New York Dolls, Mariachi el Bronx, The Psychedelic Furs, and Phoenix opening for them. The band then embarked on their first Latin America tour in November, playing in countries like the Dominican Republic, Colombia, and Peru for the first time, with bands such as Hello Seahorse!, Polbo, and Black Drawing Chalks opening for the Killers.

The Killers' played their first shows on the continent of Africa in early December, performing in Johannesburg and Cape Town, joined by Zebra & Giraffe as the opener, as well as their first show in the UAE in Abu Dhabi on December 8. The remainder of the shows planned for Asia and Oceania leg of the tour in early 2010, including places like Singapore, Hong Kong, Beijing, Manila and Seoul, were cancelled due to the passing of frontman Brandon Flowers' mother. However, the band still performed at the Good Vibrations Festival in eastern Australia in late February 2010, bringing the Day & Age World Tour to a close.

=== Festivals ===
The Killers played a plethora of festivals during the Day & Age World Tour, starting with the Coachella Festival in California in April 2009, and later Lollapalooza in Chicago in August 2009. The band also performed at other festivals such as Pinkpop, Rock Werchter, T in the Park, Oxegen, and V, as well as performing at the War Child beneficiary concert in London in February with Coldplay.

=== Live from the Royal Albert Hall ===
The Killers' performance at the Royal Albert Hall in London on July 5 and 6, 2009 was filmed and recorded for their first and only live album, Live from the Royal Albert Hall. The DVD release features a mix of recordings of songs from July 5 and 6, as well as footage from several festivals the band headlined in the summer of 2009. The CD included alongside the release of the DVD only features a select number of songs performed at the Hall, without the bonus festival footage. Live from the Royal Albert Hall was released on CD and DVD in the UK on November 9, 2009 and the following day in the US.

== Reception ==
The Day & Age World Tour garnered positive reviews from critics. Rolling Stone magazine reviewed the Killers' second warm up show of the tour, stating: "Friday's concert served dual purposes, to run briskly through the group’s catalog and to offer a preview of songs from their forthcoming Day & Age. At both ends, they succeeded." MusicRadar praised one of the band's warm-up shows at the Royal Albert Hall in London, praising them for the fact that "most groups can't even envision, let alone pull off, combining the epic, emotional vistas of Bruce Springsteen with the detached, cool aesthetics of New Order, but [...] The Killers have digested both elements completely and distill them into a style that is uniquely their own." The Minnesota Star Tribune reviewed the show at Northrop Auditorium, proclaiming that "whether buoyant or bracing, the Killers' music was a wall-of-sound assault, sometimes majestic, occasionally swirling, often intense and always loud."

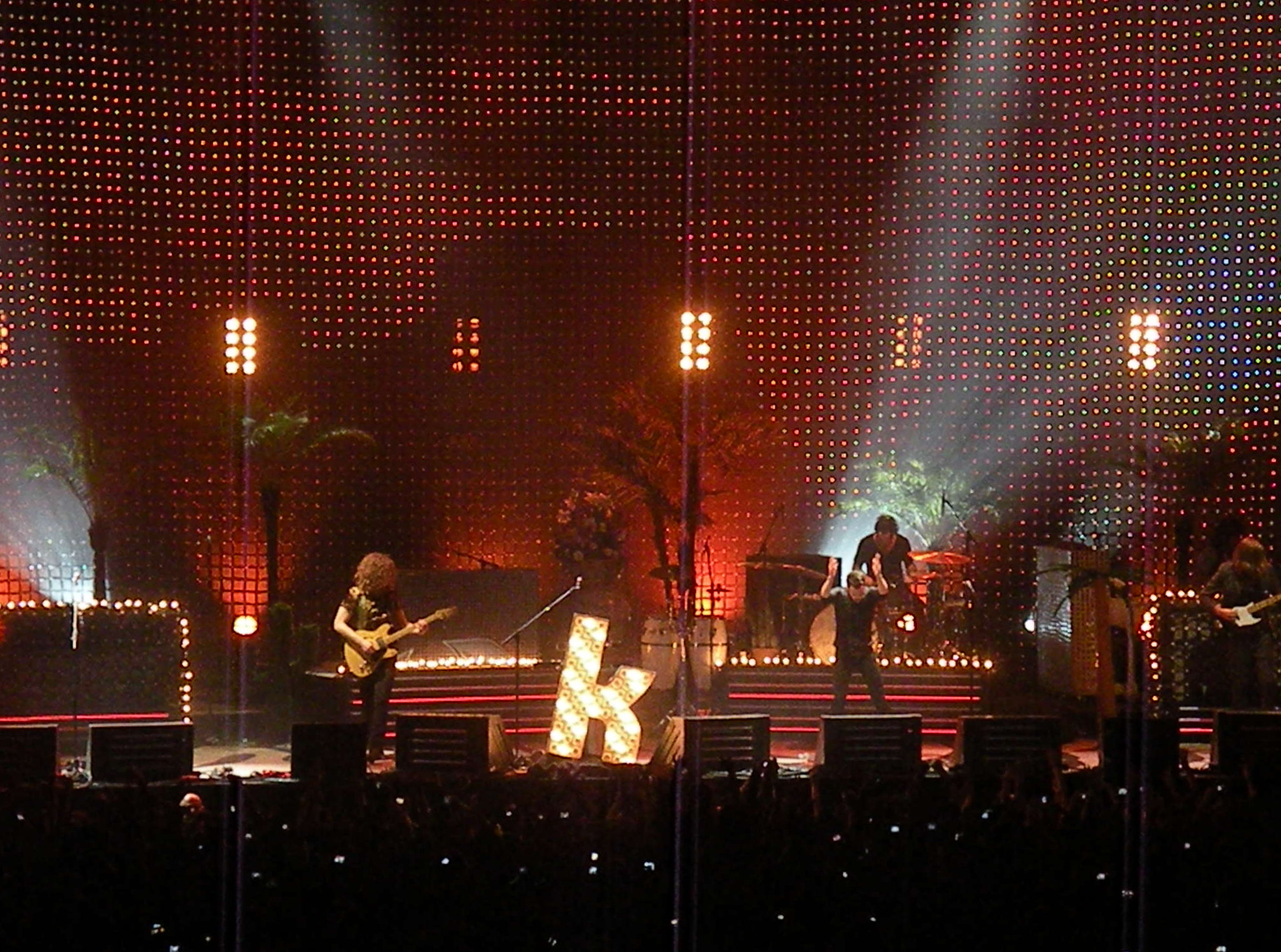
The Killers performing in Barcelona in March 2009

MIT newspaper The Tech assessed a show at the Agganis Arena, praising the Killers for their "dynamic stage presence that stirred the crowd. The songs performed live were just as polished as the recorded ones. Unlike many major label bands, the Killers' music isn't smoke and mirrors. They have real talent," while Clevescene reviewed the show at Time Warner Cable Amphitheater, commenting "when the biggest baddest light show and stage set is matched with a truly empowering performance, the results can be truly spectacular, like they were at last night’s Killers concert." The Independent reviewed the show at the Royal Albert Hall in July, declaring that The Killers "might not be the coolest band in the world, but Flowers needn't have worried, there's not a hint of shame in this crowd. From the bubbling, pulsing first beats of 'Human', they are on their feet, chanting the nonsensical chorus with heartfelt zeal." The Guardian called the Killers' performance at Hard Rock Calling a time "when you want nothing more complicated than to sing along to hard, glittering tunes such as 'Somebody Told Me', 'Mr Brightside' and 'Human' - this was one of them". Clash Music attended the Killers' performance at the V Festival in 2009, commenting: "Taking to the stage at V Festival’s Staffordshire site, The Killers were on jubilant form. Lead singer Brandon Flowers wore a sparkling black jacket, with the group delving into their golden run of hits to send the crowd into rapture".

== Personnel ==
Credits adapted from the liner notes of Live from the Royal Albert Hall.

=== The Killers ===
- Brandon Flowers – lead vocals, keyboards, piano, bass (on "For Reasons Unknown")
- Dave Keuning – lead guitar, backing vocals
- Mark Stoermer – bass, backing vocals, rhythm guitar (on "For Reasons Unknown")
- Ronnie Vannucci Jr. – drums, percussion

=== Additional musicians ===
- Ray Suen – keyboards, rhythm guitar, violin, backing vocals
- Tommy Marth – saxophone, backing vocals
- Rob Whited – percussion, backing vocals
- Bobby Lee Parker – acoustic guitar

== Set list ==
=== First set list ===
This set list of representative of the show on February 20, 2009 in Dublin. It is not intended to represent all shows from the tour.

1. "Spaceman"
2. "Losing Touch"
3. "Somebody Told Me"
4. "Smile Like You Mean It"
5. "This Is Your Life"
6. "Joy Ride"
7. "I Can't Stay"
8. "Bling (Confession of a King)"
9. "Shadowplay" (Joy Division cover)
10. "For Reasons Unknown"
11. "Neon Tiger"
12. "Human"
13. "Sam's Town" (Abbey Road Version)
14. "Read My Mind"
15. "Mr. Brightside"
16. "All These Things That I've Done"

Encore

17. "A Dustland Fairytale"
18. "Bones"
19. "Jenny Was a Friend of Mine"
20. "When You Were Young"

=== Second set list ===
This set list of representative of the show on July 6, 2009 in London. It is not intended to represent all shows from the tour.

1. "Human"
2. "This Is Your Life"
3. "Somebody Told Me"
4. "For Reasons Unknown"
5. "The World We Live In"
6. "Joy Ride"
7. "I Can't Stay"
8. "Bling (Confession of a King)"
9. "Shadowplay" (Joy Division cover)
10. "Smile Like You Mean It"
11. "Losing Touch"
12. "Spaceman"
13. "A Dustland Fairytale"
14. "Sam's Town" (Abbey Road Version)
15. "Read My Mind"
16. "Mr. Brightside"
17. "All These Things That I've Done"

Encore

18. "Sweet Talk"
19. "This River Is Wild"
20. "Bones"
21. "Jenny Was a Friend of Mine"
22. "When You Were Young"

=== Third set list ===
This set list of representative of the show on November 21, 2009 in São Paulo. It is not intended to represent all shows from the tour.

1. "Human"
2. "This Is Your Life"
3. "Somebody Told Me"
4. "For Reasons Unknown"
5. "Bones"
6. "The World We Live In"
7. "Joy Ride"
8. "Bling (Confession of a King)"
9. "Shadowplay" (Joy Division cover)
10. "Smile Like You Mean It"
11. "Spaceman"
12. "A Dustland Fairytale"
13. "Can't Help Falling in Love" (Elvis Presley cover)
14. "Read My Mind"
15. "Mr. Brightside"
16. "All These Things That I've Done"

Encore

17. "Jenny Was a Friend of Mine"
18. "When You Were Young"

== Tour dates ==
Date	City	Country	Venue	Opening act(s)
Warm-up Dates
October 20, 2008	Paradise	United States	House of Blues	Neon Trees
October 24, 2008	New York City	United States	Hammerstein Ballroom	—
October 28, 2008	Paris	France	Nouveau Casino	—
November 2, 2008	London	United Kingdom	Bush Hall	—
November 3, 2008	London	United Kingdom	Royal Albert Hall	Zane Lowe
November 11, 2008	Berlin	Germany	Kesselhaus	—
November 18, 2008	Toronto	Canada	Massey Hall	—
December 9, 2008 (Note: This concert was a part of "Deck the Hall Ball".)	Seattle	United States	WaMu Theater	—
December 11, 2008 (Note: This concert was a part of "Not So Silent Night".)	Oakland	United States	Oracle Arena	—
December 12, 2008	San Francisco	United States	The Warfield	Neon Trees
December 14, 2008 (Note: This concert was a part of "KROQ Almost Acoustic Christmas".)	Los Angeles	United States	Gibson Amphitheatre	—
North America I
January 16, 2009	Boulder	United States	Fox Theatre	—
January 17, 2009	Denver	United States	Magness Arena	M83
January 19, 2009	Minneapolis	United States	Northrop Auditorium	M83
January 20, 2009	Chicago	United States	UIC Pavilion	M83
January 22, 2009	Ypsilanti	United States	Ypsilanti Convocation Center	M83
January 23, 2009	Toronto	Canada	Air Canada Centre	M83
January 25, 2009	New York City	United States	Madison Square Garden	M83
January 26, 2009	Boston	United States	Agganis Arena	M83
January 28, 2009	Fairfax	United States	Patriot Center	M83
January 29, 2009	Myrtle Beach	United States	House of Blues Myrtle Beach	M83
January 30, 2009	Atlanta	United States	Atlanta Civic Center	M83
January 31, 2009	Nashville	United States	Grand Ole Opry House	M83
February 2, 2009	Houston	United States	Verizon Wireless Theater	M83
February 3, 2009	Austin	United States	Frank Erwin Center	M83
February 4, 2009	Grand Prairie	United States	Verizon Theatre at Grand Prairie	M83
Europe I
February 18, 2009 (Note: This concert was in aid of "War Child".)	London	United Kingdom	O_{2} Shepherd's Bush Empire	—
February 20, 2009	Dublin	Ireland	The O_{2}	Louis XIV
February 21, 2009	Belfast	United Kingdom	Odyssey Arena	Louis XIV
February 23, 2009	London	United Kingdom	The O_{2} Arena	Louis XIV
February 24, 2009	London	United Kingdom	The O_{2} Arena	Louis XIV
February 26, 2009	Birmingham	United Kingdom	LG Arena	Louis XIV
February 27, 2009	Birmingham	United Kingdom	LG Arena	Louis XIV
February 28, 2009	Cardiff	United Kingdom	Cardiff International Arena	Louis XIV
March 2, 2009	Sheffield	United Kingdom	Sheffield Arena	Louis XIV
March 3, 2009	Nottingham	United Kingdom	Nottingham Arena	Louis XIV
March 5, 2009	Aberdeen	United Kingdom	Aberdeen Exhibition and Conference Centre	Louis XIV
March 6, 2009	Glasgow	United Kingdom	Scottish Exhibition and Conference Centre	Louis XIV
March 7, 2009	Newcastle	United Kingdom	Metro Radio Arena	Louis XIV
March 9, 2009	Manchester	United Kingdom	Manchester Arena	Louis XIV
March 10, 2009	Manchester	United Kingdom	Manchester Arena	Louis XIV
Europe II
March 13, 2009	Düsseldorf	Germany	Philips Halle	Louis XIV
March 14, 2009	Berlin	Germany	Max-Schmeling-Halle	Louis XIV
March 16, 2009	Munich	Germany	Zenith	Louis XIV
March 17, 2009	Assago	Italy	DatchForum	Louis XIV
March 18, 2009	Zürich	Switzerland	Hallenstadion	Louis XIV
March 19, 2009	Paris	France	Zénith de Paris	Louis XIV
March 21, 2009	Barcelona	Spain	Palau Sant Jordi	Louis XIV
March 22, 2009	Madrid	Spain	Palacio de Deportes de la Comunidad	Louis XIV
Oceania
March 28, 2009 (Note: This concert was a part of the "V Festival".)	Sydney	Australia	Centennial Park	—
March 29, 2009	Gold Coast	Australia	Avica Resort	—
April 4, 2009	Melbourne	Australia	Royal Melbourne Showgrounds	—
April 5, 2009	Perth	Australia	Claremont Showground	—
April 8, 2009	Auckland	Australia	Vector Arena	—
North America II
April 17, 2009	Paradise	United States	The Joint	Wild Light
April 18, 2009 (Note: This concert was a part of "Coachella Valley Music and Arts Festival".)	Indio	United States	Empire Polo Club	—
April 19, 2009	San Jose	United States	Event Center Arena	Wild Light
April 22, 2009	Seattle	United States	WaMu Theater	Wild Light
April 23, 2009	Victoria	Canada	Save-On-Foods Memorial Centre	Wild Light
April 24, 2009	Vancouver	Canada	Thunderbird Stadium	Wild Light
April 26, 2009	Calgary	Canada	Pengrowth Saddledome	Wild Light
April 27, 2009	Edmonton	Canada	Rexall Place	Wild Light
April 30, 2009	Milwaukee	United States	The Eagles Club	Wild Light
May 1, 2009	Indianapolis	United States	Murat Shrine	Wild Light
May 2, 2009	Bonner Springs	United States	Capitol Federal Park at Sandstone	Wild Light
May 4, 2009	St. Louis	United States	Fox Theatre	Chairlift
May 5, 2009	Columbus	United States	Lifestyle Communities Pavilion	Chairlift
May 6, 2009	Cleveland	United States	Time Warner Cable Amphitheater	Chairlift
May 8, 2009	Camden	United States	Susquehanna Bank Center	Chairlift
May 9, 2009	Uncasville	United States	Mohegan Sun Arena	Chairlift
Europe III				
May 29, 2009	Amsterdam	Netherlands	Heineken Music Hall	—
May 30, 2009 (Note: This concert was a part of "Pinkpop Festival".)	Landgraaf	Netherlands	Megaland Landgraaf	—
May 31, 2009	Hamburg	Germany	Color Line Arena	—
June 3, 2009 (Note: This concert was a part of "Skive Festival".)	Skive	Denmark	Strandtangen	—
June 5, 2009 (Note: This concert was a part of "Rock am Ring".)	Nürburg	Germany	Nürburgring	—
June 6, 2009 (Note: This concert was a part of "Rock im Park".)	Nuremberg	Germany	Frankenstadion	—
June 7, 2009	Ljubljana	Slovenia	Ljubljana Hippodrome	—
June 8, 2009	Verona	Italy	Verona Arena	—
June 22, 2009	Oslo	Norway	Rockefeller Music Hall	—
June 23, 2009 (Note: This concert was a part of the "Hove Festival".)	Arendal	Norway	Tromøy Harbour	—
June 26, 2009 (Note: This concert was a part of "Hard Rock Calling".)	London	United Kingdom	Hyde Park	—
July 1, 2009 (Note: This concert was a part of "B'estFest".)	Bucharest	Romania	B'estfest Park	—
July 3, 2009 (Note: This concert was a part of "Rock Werchter".)	Werchter	Belgium	Festivalpark Werchter	—
July 5, 2009 (Note: This concert was recorded for Live from the Royal Albert Hall.)	London	United Kingdom	Royal Albert Hall	Jimmy Carr
July 6, 2009	London	United Kingdom	Royal Albert Hall	Jimmy Carr
July 9, 2009 (Note: This concert was a part of "Hultsfred Festival".)	Hultsfred	Sweden	Lake Hulingen Bay	—
July 11, 2009 (Note: This concert was a part of "T in the Park".)	Kinross	United Kingdom	T in the Park	—
July 12, 2009 (Note: This concert was a part of "Oxegen".)	Naas	Ireland	Punchestown Racecourse	—
July 14, 2009 (Note: This concert was a part of "Rock in Roma".)	Rome	Italy	Roma Ippodromo delle Capannelle	—
July 16, 2009 (Note: This concert was a part of "Vieilles Charrues Festival".)	Carhaix	France	La Prairie de Kerampuilh	—
July 18, 2009 (Note: This concert was a part of "Super Bock Super Rock".)	Lisbon	Portugal	Estádio do Restelo	—
July 19, 2009 (Note: This concert was a part of the "Festival Internacional de Benicassim".)	Benicàssim	Spain	Benicàssim Festival Grounds	—
North America III
August 8, 2009	Elizabeth	United States	Horseshoe Southern Indiana	—
August 9, 2009 (Note: This concert was a part of "Lollapalooza".)	Chicago	United States	Grant Park	—
Europe IV
August 20, 2009 (Note: This concert was a part of "Coke Live Music Festival".)	Kraków	Poland	Polish Aviation Museum	—
August 22, 2009 (Note: This concert was a part of "V Festival".)	Chelmsford	United Kingdom	Hylands Park	—
August 23, 2009	Staffordshire	United Kingdom	Weston Park	—
North America IV
August 31, 2009	Columbia	United States	Merriweather Post Pavilion	Wolfmother
September 1, 2009	Wantagh	United States	Nikon at Jones Beach Theater	Wolfmother
September 2, 2009	Holmdel	United States	PNC Bank Arts Center	Wolfmother
September 4, 2009	Boston	United States	TD Garden	Wolfmother
September 5, 2009	Montreal	Canada	Bell Centre	Wolfmother
September 6, 2009	Toronto	Canada	Molson Canadian Amphitheatre	Wolfmother
September 9, 2009	Morrison	United States	Red Rocks Amphitheatre	Nervous Wreckords
September 12, 2009	Mountain View	United States	Shoreline Amphitheatre	Nervous Wreckords, New York Dolls
September 13, 2009	Santa Barbara	United States	Santa Barbara Bowl	New York Dolls
September 15, 2009	Irvine	United States	Bren Events Center	Nervous Wreckords, Mariachi el Bronx
September 16, 2009	Los Angeles	United States	Hollywood Bowl	The Psychedelic Furs
September 18, 2009	San Diego	United States	Cox Arena	Nervous Wreckords, Halloween Town
September 19, 2009	Paradise	United States	Mandalay Bay Events Center	Halloween Town, Phoenix
September 22, 2009	Sacramento	United States	ARCO Arena	Nervous Wreckords, Mariachi el Bronx
September 24, 2009	Portland	United States	Portland Veterans Memorial Coliseum	Nervous Wreckords, Mariachi el Bronx
September 25, 2009	Boise	United States	Qwest Arena Boise	Nervous Wreckords, Mariachi el Bronx
September 26, 2009	West Valley City	United States	E. Center	Nervous Wreckords, Mariachi el Bronx
September 28, 2009	Phoenix	United States	Dodge Theater	Nervous Wreckords
October 1, 2009	Orlando	United States	UCF Arena	Chairlift
October 2, 2009	Tampa	United States	USF Sun Dome	Chairlift
October 3, 2009	Miami	United States	American Airlines Arena	Chairlift
Latin America
November 3, 2009	Monterrey	Mexico	Monterrey Arena	Sexy Marvin
November 5, 2009	Guadalajara	Mexico	Telmex Auditorium	—
November 7, 2009	Mexico City	Mexico	Palacio de los Deportes	Hello Seahorse!
November 8, 2009	Mexico City	Mexico	Palacio de los Deportes	Hello Seahorse!
November 11, 2009	San Juan	Puerto Rico	José Miguel Agrelot Coliseum	Polbo
November 13, 2009	Santo Domingo	Dominican Republic	Estadio Olímpico Félix Sánchez	—
November 15, 2009	Bogotá	Colombia	Parque Jaime Duque	—
November 19, 2009	Lima	Peru	Estadio Monumental "U"	—
November 21, 2009	São Paulo	Brazil	Chácara do Jockey	Black Drawing Chalks
November 27, 2009	Buenos Aires	Argentina	Estadio G.E.B.A.	Cuentos Borgeanos
November 29, 2009	Santiago	Chile	Movistar Arena	—
Africa, Asia & Oceania
December 3, 2009	Johannesburg	South Africa	Coca-Cola Dome	—
December 4, 2009	Johannesburg	South Africa	Coca-Cola Dome	—
December 6, 2009	Cape Town	South Africa	Val De Vie Wine Estate	Zebra & Giraffe
December 8, 2009	Abu Dhabi	United Arab Emirates	Emirates Palace Ballroom	—
February 20, 2010 (Note: This concert was a part of "Good Vibrations Festival".)	Southport	Australia	Gold Coast Parklands	—
February 21, 2010	Melbourne	Australia	Flemington Racecourse	—

=== Cancelled shows ===
List of cancelled shows with date, city, venue, and reason
Date	City	Venue	Reason
June 28, 2009	Athens	Terra Vibe Park	Cancelled due to dangerous weather conditions
January 24, 2010	Singapore	Singapore Indoor Stadium	Cancelled due to family bereavement
January 26, 2010	Beijing	Workers Indoor Arena	Cancelled due to family bereavement
January 29, 2010	Hong Kong	AsiaWorld-Expo	Cancelled due to family bereavement
January 31, 2010	Manila	SM Mall of Asia	Cancelled due to family bereavement
February 4, 2010	Tokyo	Zepp	Cancelled due to family bereavement
February 6, 2010	Seoul	Olympic Hall	Cancelled due to family bereavement
February 12, 2010	Sydney	Enmore Theatre	Cancelled due to family bereavement
February 13, 2010	Sydney	Centennial Park	Cancelled due to family bereavement
February 14, 2010	Perth	Claremont Showground	Cancelled due to family bereavement
