= Latin Grammy Award for Best Rock Album by a Duo or Group with Vocal =

- Current: Latin Grammy Awards of 2009
- Awarded for: vocal rock, hard rock or metal albums containing at least 51% of newly recorded material
- Country: United States
- Presented by: The Latin Recording Academy
- First award: 2001
- Final award: 2009
- Website: latingrammy.com

The Latin Grammy Award for Best Rock Album by a Duo or Group with Vocal was an honor presented annually by the Latin Academy of Recording Arts & Sciences. It was given at the Latin Grammy Awards, a ceremony that recognizes excellence and promotes a wider awareness of cultural diversity and contributions of Latin recording artists in the United States and overseas. According to the category description guide for the 2009 Latin Grammy Awards, the award was given to vocal rock, hard rock or metal albums containing at least 51 percent of newly recorded material. It was given to duos or groups. The award was last presented at the 2009 Latin Grammy Awards, being replaced in 2010 with the Best Rock Album award.

The accolade for Best Rock Album by a Duo or Group with Vocal was first presented to the Colombian group Aterciopelados at the 2nd Latin Grammy Awards in 2001 for their album Gozo Poderoso. Mexican ensembles have received the award more times than any other nationality, though award-winning albums have also been performed by musicians originating from Chile, Colombia and Panama. Molotov and La Ley has won the most awards in the category, with two wins each. Natalia y La Forquetina, the short-lived band of Mexican singer-songwriter Natalia Lafourcade, is the only band led by a woman to be awarded. Spanish band Jarabe de Palo is the most nominated ensemble without a win, with three unsuccessful attempts.

== Recipients ==
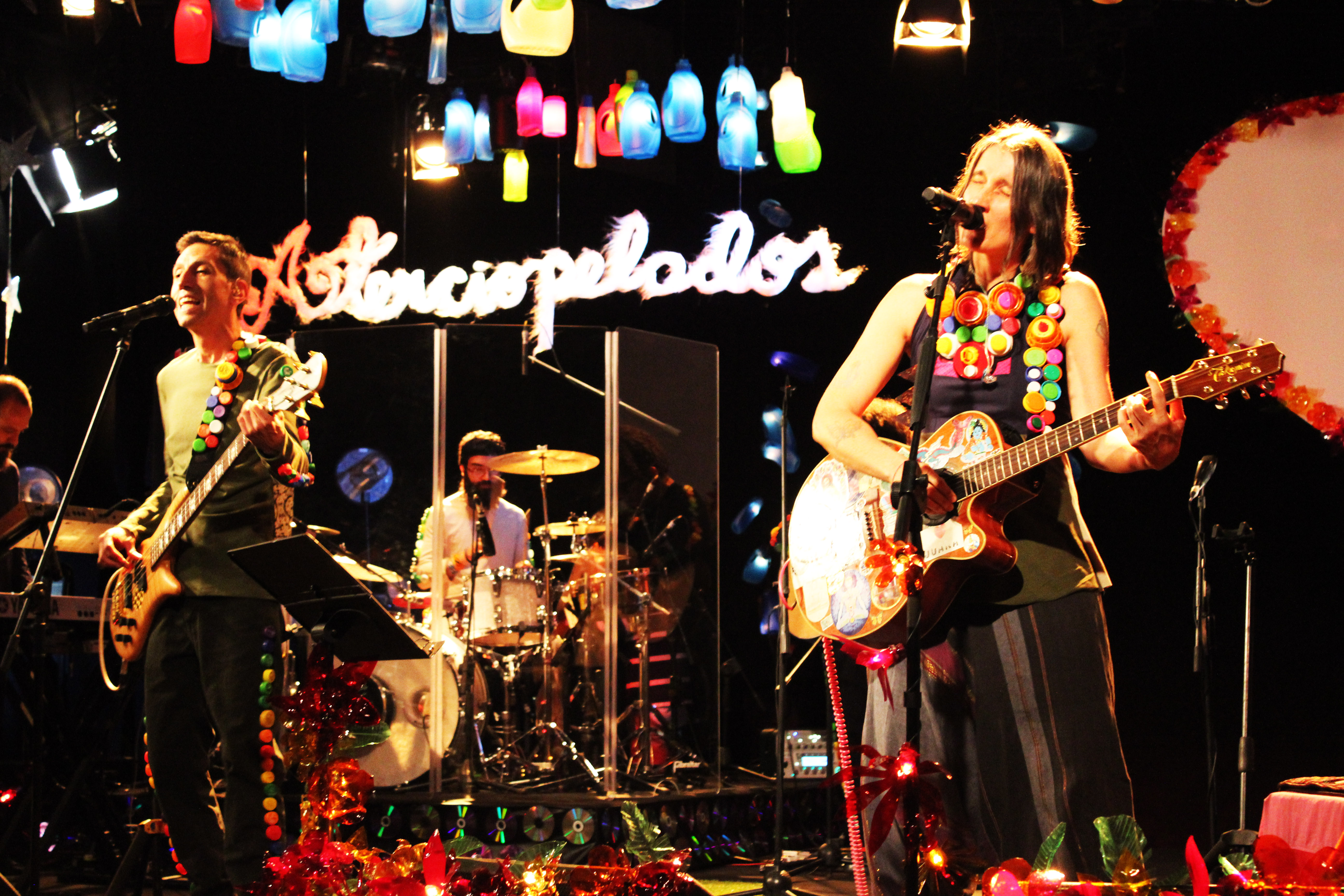
Colombian duo Aterciopelados was the first winner of the award in 2001.

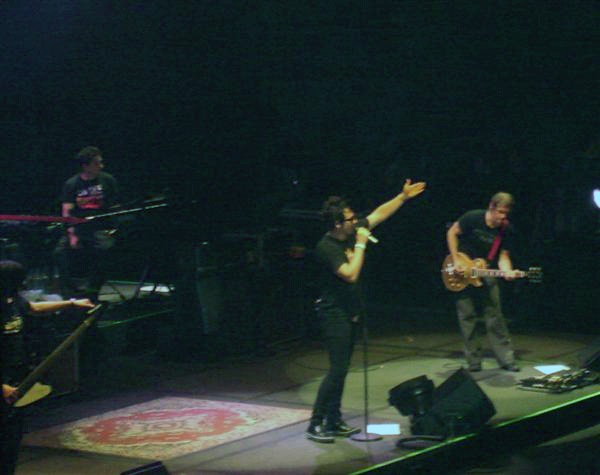
Two-time winners, Chilean band La Ley.

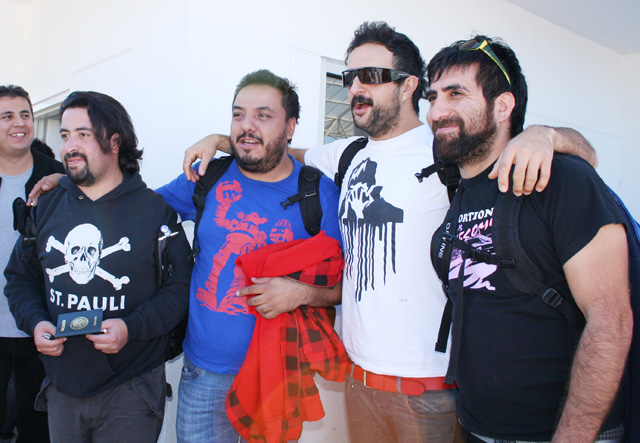
Two-time winners, Mexican band Molotov.

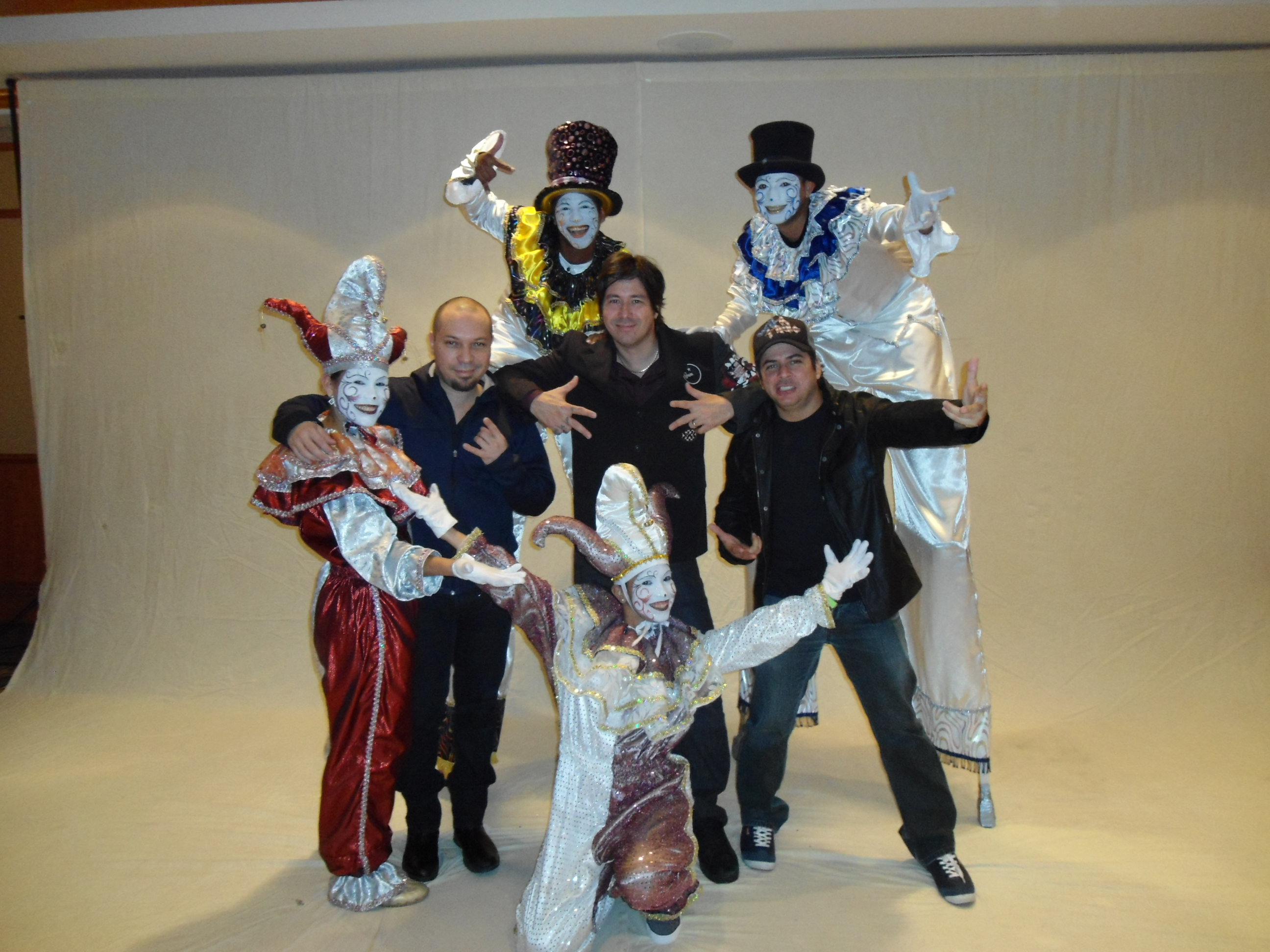
2007 winners, Panamanian band Los Rabanes.

Year^{[I]}	Performing artist(s)	Work	Nominees^{[II]}	Ref.
2001	Aterciopelados	Gozo Poderoso	Jarabe de Palo – De Vuelta y Vuelta; Los Amigos Invisibles – Arepa 3000; Los Rabanes – Rabanes; Super Ratones – Mancha Registrada	
2002	La Ley	MTV Unplugged	Babasónicos – Jessico; Circo – No Todo Lo Que Es Pop Es Bueno; Elefante – El Que Busca Encuentra; Kinky – Kinky	
2003	Maná	Revolución de Amor	Jaguares – El Primer Instinto; Jarabe de Palo – Bonito; Molotov – Dance and Dense Denso; Los Rabanes – Money Pa' Qué	
2004	La Ley	Libertad	Bersuit – La Argentinidad al Palo; Café Quijano – ¡Qué Grande es Esto del Amor!; Divididos – Vivo Acá; El Tri – Alex Lora: 35 Años y lo Que le Falta Todavía	
2005	Molotov	Con Todo Respeto	Enanitos Verdes – En Vivo; Jarabe de Palo – 1m² Un Metro Cuadrado; Locos Por Juana – Música Pa'l Pueblo; Volumen Cero – Estelar	
2006	Natalia y La Forquetina	Casa	Black Guayaba – Lo Demas es Plástico; Motel – Motel; Polbo – Polbo; Rata Blanca – La Llave de la Puerta Secreta	
2007	Los Rabanes	Kamikaze	Attaque 77 – Karmagedon; Bengala – Bengala; La Renga – TruenoTierra; PXNDX – Amantes Sunt Amentes	
2008	Molotov	Eternamiente	Bersuit – ?; Catupecu Machu – Laberintos Entre Artistas y Dialectos; Héroes del Silencio – Tour 2007; PXNDX – Sinfonía Soledad	
2009	Jaguares	45	Airbag – Una Hora a Tokyo; El Tri – Alex Lora de El Three a El Tri Rolas del Alma, Mi Mente y Mi Aferración; Rata Blanca – El Reino Olvidado; Volován – Hogar	

== Notes ==
^{^[I]} Each year is linked to the article about the Latin Grammy Awards held that year
^{^[II]} The nationality of the performing artist(s)
^{^[III]} The name of the performer and the nominated album

== See also ==
- Grammy Award for Best Rock Album
