= Chris Gehringer =

American mastering engineer (born 1962)

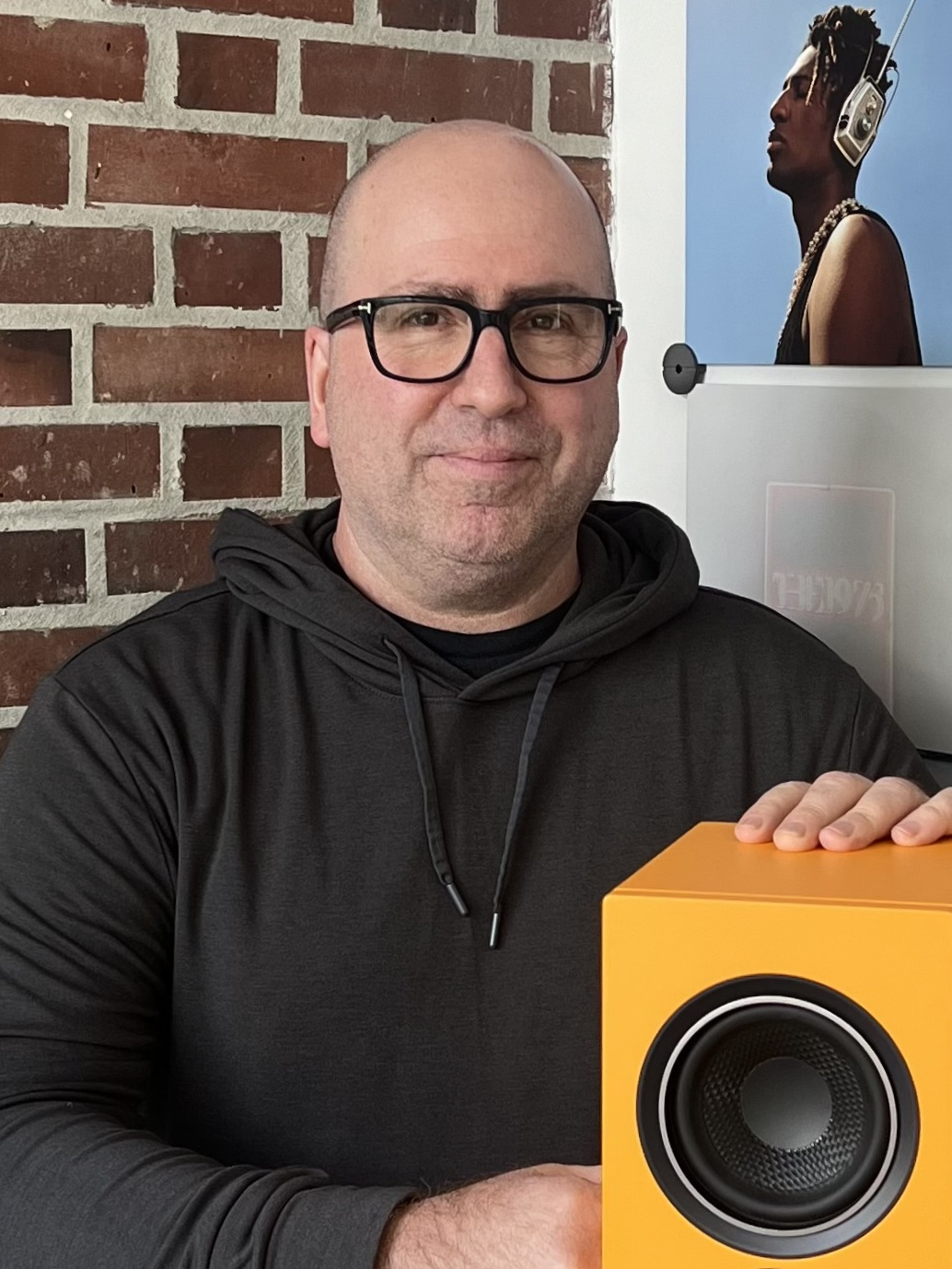
- Gehringer in 2023

Background information
- Born: May 27, 1962 (age 64); Teaneck, New Jersey, U.S.
- Occupation: Mastering engineer
- Website: sterling-sound.com/engineers/chris-gehringer/

Chris Gehringer (born May 27, 1962) is an American mastering engineer at Sterling Sound in New Jersey.

Gehringer is known for having mastered recordings by popular artists such as AJR, Dua Lipa, Drake, Ed Sheeran, Gwen Stefani, Harry Styles, Lady Gaga, Rihanna, Selena Gomez, Twenty One Pilots, Lana Del Rey, Lil Nas X, Lizzo, and many others. Works engineered by Gehringer span many genres such as pop, R&B, hip hop, and dance.

== Early life ==
Gehringer was born in Teaneck, New Jersey and raised in Bergen County. After graduating from Pascack Hills High School in Montvale, New Jersey, he attended the Institute of Audio Research.

== Career ==
Gehringer’s first job in the music industry was at Greene Street Recording. From there, he went on to work as a cutting assistant at Trutone Records.

In 1985, Gehringer joined Tom Coyne and Herbie Powers at Frankford-Wayne Mastering and mastered primarily dance and R&B records throughout the 1980s.

In 1988, he moved to the Hit Factory, where he worked for twelve years. During his time there, he witnessed the golden age of hip hop, mastering landmark releases by artists such as Naughty By Nature, Mobb Deep, Wu Tang Clan, and PM Dawn.

In 1999, Gehringer joined Sterling Sound as a senior mastering engineer.

Gehringer received his first Grammy Awards nominations in 2012 in the category of Album of the Year. He was nominated both for his work on Rihanna’s Loud and for his work on Lady Gaga’s Born This Way. Since then, he has been nominated for 21 Grammys and 7 Latin Grammys. In 2022, he won Latin Grammy Awards for Best Engineered Album and Album of the Year for his mastering work on Rosalía's album Motomami.

In 2016, he became an official partner of Sterling Sound.

== Awards and nominations ==
Grammy Awards

Year	Nominee / work	Award	Result
2012	Loud	Album of the Year	Nominated
2012	Born This Way	Album of the Year	Nominated
2013	Some Nights	Album of the Year	Nominated
2013	"Stronger (What Doesn't Kill You)"	Record of the Year	Nominated
2013	"We Are Young"	Record of the Year	Nominated
2014	"Blurred Lines"	Record of the Year	Nominated
2016	"Work"	Record of the Year	Nominated
2016	"Stressed Out"	Record of the Year	Nominated
2019	Dirty Computer	Album of the Year	Nominated
2019	Head Over Heels	Best Engineered Album, Non-Classical	Nominated
2020	"Truth Hurts"	Record of the Year	Nominated
2020	Norman Fucking Rockwell!	Album of the Year	Nominated
2020	Cuz I Love You	Album of the Year	Nominated
2021	Future Nostalgia	Album of the Year	Nominated
2021	"Don't Start Now"	Record of the Year	Nominated
2022	"Montero (Call Me by Your Name)"	Record of the Year	Nominated
2022	Montero	Album of the Year	Nominated
2024	World Music Radio	Album of the Year	Nominated
2024	"Worship"	Record of the Year	Nominated
2024	Desire, I Want to Turn Into You	Best Engineered Album, Non-Classical	Nominated
2025	Cyan Blue	Best Engineered Album, Non-Classical	Nominated

Latin Grammy Awards

Year	Nominee / work	Award	Result
2008	Eternamiente	Best Rock Album by a Duo or Group with Vocal	Won
2012	Peligro	Album of the Year	Nominated
2017	Felices los 4	Record of the Year	Nominated
2022	La Fama	Record of the Year	Nominated
2022	Motomami	Best Engineered Album	Won
2022	Motomami	Album of the Year	Won
2023	Despechá	Record of the Year	Nominated

TEC Awards

Year	Nominee / work	Award	Result
2011	"F***k You"	Record Production/Single	Nominated

== Notable works ==
As adapted from the Career Highlights section of Gehringer's official web page.

- Naughty by Nature, by Naughty by Nature, 1991
- Boomerang: Original Soundtrack Album, by various artists, 1992
- Enter the Wu-Tang (36 Chambers), by Wu-Tang Clan, 1993
- "Thug Love", by 50 Cent, 1999
- Hot Shot, by Shaggy, 2000
- Stillmatic, by Nas, 2001
- Loose, by Nelly Furtado, 2006
- We Sing. We Dance. We Steal Things. by Jason Mraz, 2008
- Thank Me Later, by Drake, 2010
- Loud, by Rihanna, 2010
- Born This Way, by Lady Gaga, 2011
- Unapologetic, by Rihanna, 2012
- Blurryface, by Twenty One Pilots, 2015
- "Be Careful", by Cardi B, 2016
- Anti, by Rihanna, 2016
- Harry Styles, by Harry Styles, 2017
- Masseduction, by St. Vincent, 2017
- One More Light, by Linkin Park, 2017
- Good Thing, by Leon Bridges, 2018
- Head over Heels, by Chromeo, 2018
- Dirty Computer, by Janelle Monáe, 2018
- Cuz I Love You, by Lizzo, 2018
- Trench by Twenty One Pilots, 2018
- Norman Fucking Rockwell!, by Lana Del Rey, 2019
- Future Nostalgia, by Dua Lipa, 2019
- Glow On, by Turnstile, 2020
- "Heat Waves", by Glass Animals, 2021
- Scaled and Icy by Twenty One Pilots, 2021
- 5SOS5, by 5 Seconds of Summer, 2022
- "I Ain't Worried", by OneRepublic, 2022
- Dance Fever, by Florence and the Machine, 2022
- Motomami, by Rosalia, 2022
- "Single Soon", by Selena Gomez, 2023
- World Music Radio, by Jon Batiste, 2023
- Snow Angel, by Reneé Rapp, 2023
- So Much (for) Stardust, by Fall Out Boy, 2023
- "Me & U", by Tems, 2023
- Desire, I Want to Turn Into You, by Caroline Polachek, 2023
- 7, by Nelly Furtado, 2024
- GOLDENWEEK, by MILLENNIUM PARADE, 2024
- KIZAO, by MILLENNIUM PARADE, Rauw Alejandro, Tainy, 2024
- Apt., by Rosé, Bruno Mars, 2024
- Happy, by Jin, 2024
- Burnout, by BoyWithUke, 2024
- Cosa Nuestra, by Rauw Alejandro, 2024
