= Hit Me =

Hit Me may refer to:

== Film and television ==
- Hit Me (film), a 1996 crime film directed by Steven Shainberg
- Hit Me (The Price Is Right), a game on the game show The Price is Right
- Hit Me, a 2010 short film starring Scott Porter

== Music ==
- "Hit Me", a 2002 song by Groove Coverage
- Hit Me, a 2006 album by Jill Vidal
- "Hit Me", a song by Molotov on their 2003 album Dance and Dense Denso
- "Hit Me", a song by Suede on their 2013 album Bloodsports
- "Hit Me", a song by The Whigs
- "Hit Me", a 2016 song by Blasterjaxx and DBSTF featuring Go Comet!
