= Super Pop Venezuela =

Studio album by Los Amigos Invisibles
- Released: September 5, 2006
- Genres: Funk, Dance, Disco
- Label: Gozadera Records

Los Amigos Invisibles chronology
The Venezuelan Zinga Son, Vol. 1 (2004)	Super Pop Venezuela (2006)	Commercial (2009)

Professional ratings
Review scores
Source	Rating
AllMusic	3.5/5 stars

Super Pop Venezuela is an album released by Venezuelan band Los Amigos Invisibles in 2005. It is made up entirely of covers of Venezuelan pop songs from the '60s to the early '90s.

== Track listing ==
1. "Intro"
2. "Miss Venezuela"
3. "All Day Today"
4. "Curda Y Pan"
5. "Yo Soy Así"
6. "No Es Fácil Amar A Una Mujer"
7. "Rosario"
8. "Yo No Sé"
9. "Caramelo Y Chocolate"
10. "Amar Es Algo Más"
11. "Si Tú Te vas"
12. "Ganas"
13. "Dun Dun"
14. "Mao Mao"
15. "Un Poquito Más"
16. "Media Luna"
17. "Superpop Venezuela"
18. "San Agustín"
