= Blame Me =

Blame Me may refer to:

- "Blame Me", a song by Molotov from Eternamiente, 2007
- "Blame Me", a song by Mulatto from Queen of da Souf, 2020
