= Con Todo Respeto =

2004 covers album by Molotov

Studio album by Molotov
- Released: October 26, 2004
- Genres: Rock; pop; punk; rock en español
- Length: 44:23
- Labels: Universal Music Latino, Surco
- Producer: Robert Carranza

Molotov chronology
Dance and Dense Denso (2003)	Con Todo Respeto (2004)	Eternamiente (2007)

Professional ratings
Review scores
Source	Rating
Allmusic	4/5 stars

Con Todo Respeto is a 2004 covers album by the Mexican band Molotov. The album was released in October 2004 by the label Universal Latino. The songs covered are from a variety of genres, including new wave, hip hop music, punk, and traditional music of Mexico. The title, in apparent reference to the playful cover tracks throughout, means "with all due respect" in Spanish.

This album received a Latin Grammy Award for Best Rock Vocal Album, Duo or Group at the Latin Grammy Awards of 2005.

== Track listing ==
Con Todo Respeto track listing
No.	Title	Writer(s)	Original song	Length
1.	"Amateur"	Ferdi Bolland; J. Hoelze; Robert J. Bolland	"Rock Me Amadeus" by Falco	4:19
2.	"Diseño Rolas"	Sandy Atlas; Steven Greenberg	"Designer Music" by Lipps Inc	3:03
3.	"Marciano"	Glenn Danzig	"I Turned into a Martian" by Misfits	4:08
4.	"The Revolution Will Not Be Televised (La Revo)"	Gil Scott-Heron	"The Revolution Will Not Be Televised" by Gil Scott-Heron	3:53
5.	"La Boa A Go-Go"	Felix Reyna; José Carlos Reyes	"La Boa" by La Sonora Santanera	3:42
6.	"Chavas"	Adam Keefe Horovitz; Rick Rubin	"Girls" by Beastie Boys	2:39
7.	"Mamar"	Roberto Torres Casas	"Mamá" by Los Amantes de Lola	3:57
8.	"Quen Pon-Ponk"	Alberto Mozo Crostwhaytt; Jorge Cárdenas Rincón	"Quen Pompó" by Chico Che	1:31
9.	"Da Da Da"	Kralle; Stephan Remmler	"Da Da Da" by Trio	3:31
10.	"Perro Negro Granjero"	Álex Lora; Billy Gibbons; Frank Beard; Joe Michael Hill	"Perro Negro y Callejero" by El Tri; "La Grange" by ZZ Top	3:19
11.	"Agüela"	Joe Strummer; Marvin Young; Matt Dike; Mick Jones; Topper Headon; Wilfredo Morales Luciano	"Mi Abuela" by Wilfred y La Ganga; "The Magnificent Seven" by The Clash; "Bust A Move" by Young MC	3:46
12.	"Mi Agüita Amarilla"	Pablo Carbonell	"Mi Agüita Amarilla" by Los Toreros Muertos	6:30
Total length:				44:25

== 2005 Re-edit ==
Con Todo Respeto (Unlimited Edition)

Studio album by Molotov
- Released: September 2005
- Length: 44:23
- Label: Universal Latino
- Producer: Robert Carranza

Molotov chronology
Con Todo Respeto (2004)	Con Todo Respeto (Unlimited Edition) (2005)	Eternamiente (2007)

Professional ratings
Review scores
Source	Rating
Allmusic	link

In mid-2005, a re-edit of this album was released, this time including the track «Me Vale Vergara», dedicated to the owner of Mexican soccer team Guadalajara's Chivas, businessman Jorge Vergara. This track includes references to the band's antipathy towards Vergara because of decisions he made in that club. The song was also motivated by Vergara's disparaging comment «Me pareció ver a un lindo gatito» ("I though I saw a pussy cat" or "I tawt I taw a puddy tat" in Spanish) when speaking about Mexican soccer club Pumas de la UNAM.

Originally, Me Vale Vergara circulated freely on the Internet as a demo version, so when the band decided to include it in the re-edit, it had some arrangements made. The track includes collaborations by Pumas de la UNAM team players such as "Parejita" López, Leandro Augusto, and Aílton da Silva.

For this special edition of the album, the cover design was changed, with a black background instead of the white background in the first version. There are a few added demos of some tracks, as well as a DVD with the music videos for "Amateur" and "Marciano", including a promo and a "behind the cameras" special.

This re-edit was released only in Mexico and the US under the name Con Todo Respeto, Unlimited Edition.

=== Track listing ===
1. Amateur
2. Diseño rolas
3. Marciano II (Punk Version)
4. The Revolution Will Not be Televised (demo version)
5. La Boa a go-go (demo version)
6. Chavas
7. Mamar
8. Quen Pon-Ponk (demo version)
9. Da da da
10. Perro negro granjero
11. Agüela
12. Mi agüita amarilla (demo version)
13. Me vale vergara
14. Marciano
15. The Revolution Will Not Be Televised (La Revo)
16. La boa a go-go
17. Quen Pon-Ponk
18. Mi agüita amarilla
19. Marciano veloz (demo version)

== Sales and certifications ==
Region	Certification	Certified units/sales
Mexico (AMPROFON)	Gold	50,000^{^}
^{^} Shipments figures based on certification alone.
