= Frijolero (song) =

2002 single by Molotov

Single by Molotov

from the album Dance and Dense Denso
- Released: 2002
- Studio: Larrabee Sound Studios (Los Angeles); La Casa (Los Angeles)
- Genre: Rock; rock en español
- Length: 3:33
- Label: Universal Music Latino; Surco
- Songwriters: Miguel Huidobro; Francisco Ayala; Randy Ebright
- Producer: Gustavo Santaolalla

Molotov singles chronology
"Here Comes the Mayo" (2001)	"Frijolero" (2002)	"Hit Me (Gimme Tha Power II)" (2001)

Music video
- "Frijolero" on YouTube

"Frijolero" (transl. 'Beaner') is a song by the Mexican rock band Molotov. It was released in 2002 as the lead single from the album Dance and Dense Denso. It was written by the band members Micky Huidobro, Paco Ayala, and Randy Ebright, and produced by Gustavo Santaolalla.

"Frijolero" is a rock and rock en español song with rap rock, norteño and polka influences. The lyrics describe tensions along the Mexico–United States border, focusing on racism, discrimination, and stereotypes faced by Mexicans, particularly migrants, including from U.S. Border Patrol agents. The song uses satire in Spanish and English to critique anti-Mexican sentiment in the U.S. and anti-American sentiment in Mexico.

The music video was filmed with Flash animation, and depicts the band members as migrants being chased by Border Patrol agents. It also caricatures the presidents of both countries at the time, George W. Bush of the U.S. and Vicente Fox of Mexico. It won the Latin Grammy Award for Best Short Form Music Video at the 4th Annual Latin Grammy Awards.

Belinda and Snow Tha Product covered the song in 2025. Their version features a tumbado style with urban, pop and hip-hop influences. Its music video has a vaporwave style, featuring a neon art aestethic.

== Writing and composition ==
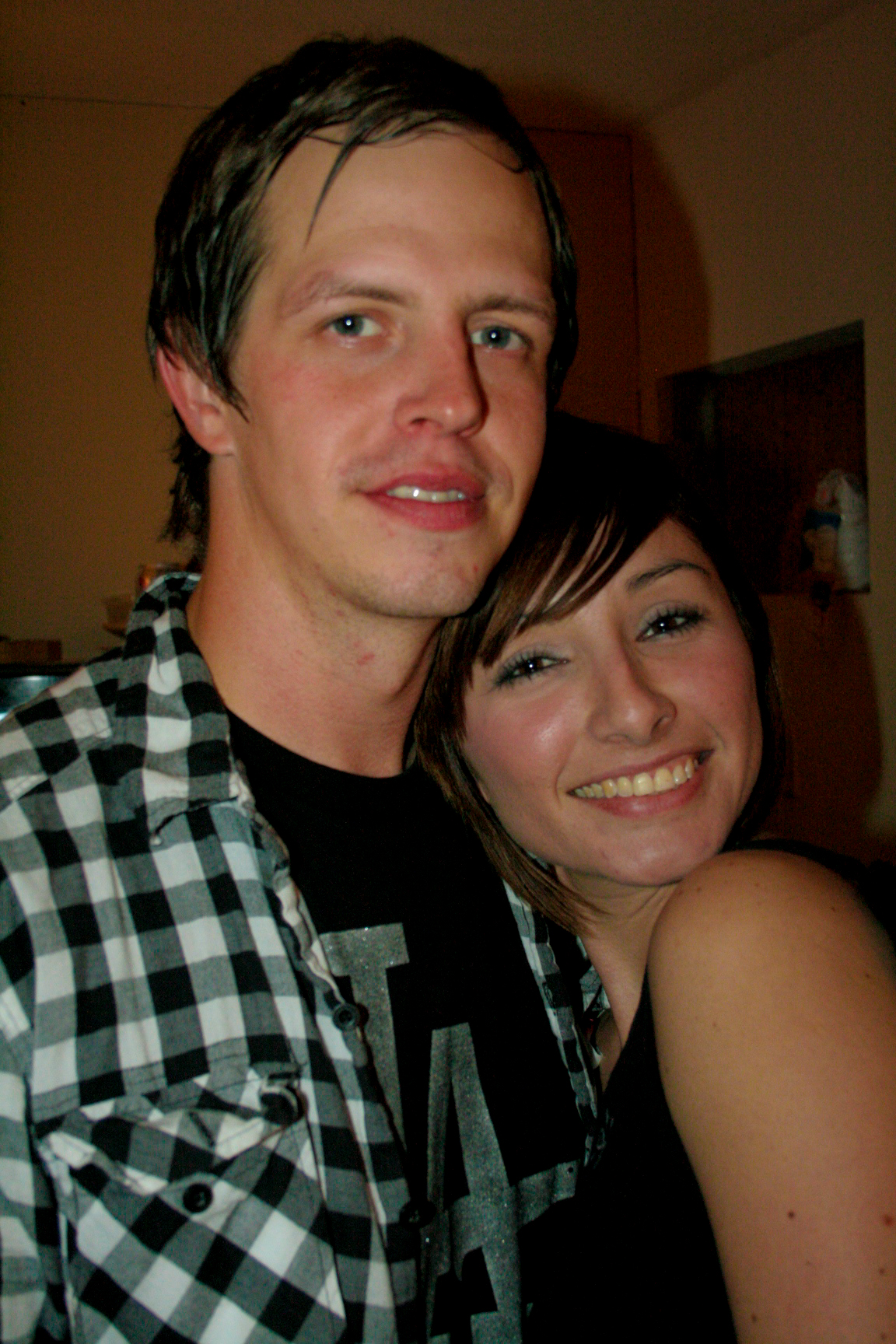
Ebright (left) with a fan in 2008. He co-wrote the song after his experiences with the U.S. immigration authorities

"Frijolero", which means 'beaner' in Spanish, was written by Molotov band members Micky Huidobro, Paco Ayala, and Randy Ebright, with production handled by Gustavo Santaolalla. Its lyrics address anti-Mexican sentiment in the U.S., whose main topics include the persecution of migrants by U.S. Border Patrol agents, military interventions carried out by the U.S., and the resulting inflation associated with a war economy. Although most of the song emphasizes the Mexican perspective, it also explores anti-American sentiment in Mexico.

Pamela Vázquez of Glamour argued that in the lyrics the band rejects the use of the term "beaner", (Note: Lyrics in Spanish: "No me digas 'beaner', Mr. Puñetero / Te sacaré un susto por racista y culero / No me llames 'frijolero', pinche gringo puñetero" (English: transl. "Don't call me 'beaner', Mr. Fucker / I'll give you a scare for being a racist and a jerk / Don't call me 'beaner', damn fucking gringo")) stereotypes portraying Mexicans as drug dealers, and reminds that "Americans are the drug consumers". (Note: Lyrics in Spanish: "Aunque nos hagan la fama / de que somos vendedores / de la droga que sembramos / ustedes son consumidores" (English: transl. "Even though they give us the reputation / of being the sellers / of the drugs we grow / you are the consumers")) She concluded that migration is the song's central theme, emphasizing empathy toward migrants who leave their families and homes to travel under dangerous conditions.

"Frijolero" is a rock and rock en español song with rap rock and polka influences. It has lyrics written in English and Spanish languages, and includes profanity and slurs. The singers, portraying two people – one from Mexico and the other from the U.S. – engage in a conversation in which they exchange sarcasms, insults, and slurs while blaming each other for their countries' problems and misunderstandings. (Note: Lyrics in English: "Don't call me gringo, you fuckin' beaner / stay on your side of that goddamn river" (Spanish: "No me llames gringo, maldito frijolero / quédate en tu lado de ese maldito río"))

Huidobro described its message as similar to that of other Molotov songs, though influenced by Norteño music through its use of accordions. Ebright, who was born in the U.S., opposed the country's politics. In an interview, he explained the origin of the song:

I have two daughters with dual citizenship, and whenever they went to visit their grandparents – my parents – my fellow countrymen would start asking questions. They even went so far as to try to open the baby's diaper to see if she was hiding something. And all because she had Mexican features and was with a white father.

Tito Fuentes, the fourth band member, said that "Frijolero" "was dedicated to the shitty Americans" who mistreated Latin Americans, particularly at the border. He added that the term beaner had been used as a derogatory label against Mexicans and other Latin Americans, and described the song as a response to that slur. He also criticized the federal government of Mexico.

In a 2018 interview, Ayala believed that the lyrics were timeless as younger listeners, unfamiliar with the group's songs, would still understand their context. When asked whether the band would release a follow-up song or another track addressing the same topic, Ayala said it "would be like trying to tell the same joke twice".

== Release and promotion ==
Molotov released Dance and Dense Denso as its third studio album in 2003. "Frijolero" was selected as the album's lead single due to the political situation lived between Mexico and the United States during the presidency of George W. Bush (2001–2008). Huidobro expected it to be promoted using its explicit version; however, Universal Music Latino instead released a radio edit, "Frijolero (Propina edit)", that censored profanity with beeps. Despite it, the song was still controversial in American radio stations.

=== Music video ===
Still from the music video showing three band members, each colored in one of the colors of the Mexican flag. The video was created using a combination of Flash animation and rotoscoping.

The music video for "Frijolero" was filmed with Flash animation, whose style has a rotoscoping and flat vector art. The video depicts migrants attempting to cross the Mexico–U.S. border, while U.S Border Patrol agents chase them. The music video features images of Bush wearing only underwear, as well as Vicente Fox, who was president of Mexico at the time.

In "The Reproduction and Imitation of Border Art throughout Mexico" Lynnaire Sheridan analyzes the border conflict through the perspective of Mexicans not living near the border, by examining songs and the music video for "Frijolero". She argued that works based on real events are not always beneficial, as songs may exaggerate the dangers faced by migrants.

The music video received the Latin Grammy Award for Best Short Form Music Video at the 4th Annual Latin Grammy Awards and an MTV Video Music Awards Latinoamérica award for Video of the Year at the 2003 ceremony.

=== Live performances ===
Molotov has performed "Frijolero" live during its tours. The song is featured on the live albums Desde Rusia con amor (2012) and MTV Unplugged: El desconecte (2018). Molotov sung "Frijolero" live at Coachella 2024 along with Carín León.

Molotov has also performed the song to protest against Arizona SB 1070, a 2010 anti-illegal immigration law. Years later, the group dedicated it to Donald Trump before his first tenure as president of the U.S.

== Reception ==
Vázquez calls "Frijolero" a "hymn of resistance" that defiantly challenges stereotypical attitudes and preconceptions with a message of pride and a cautionary tone. Pablo Monroy of Rolling Stone named it the album's highlight, describing it as "powerful". Gustavo Ogarrio of La Jornada called the song a hit, and added that its "sincerity without poetry" and its almost scathing tone condemn the situation at the border.

Greg Schelonka wrote in Peace Review that "Frijolero" endures Molotov's challenge to middle-class notions of decency through a "vulgar examination of stereotypes". According to him, the song explains why migrants leave Latin America for the U.S., citing the latter's more stable economy and political conditions. In his opinion, the lyrics focus on insulting Americans rather than on debating the issues.

== Personnel ==
Credits adapted from Dance and Dense Denso.

- Francisco Ayala – vocals, background vocals, guitar
- Tom Baker – mastering engineer
- Robert Carranza – recording engineer, mixing engineer
- Randy Ebright– vocals, background vocals, guitar
- Ismael Fuentes – background vocals, bass
- Miguel Huidobro– background vocals, drums
- Aníbal Kerpel – recording engineer
- Gustavo Santaolalla – producer

== Belinda and Snow Tha Product version ==
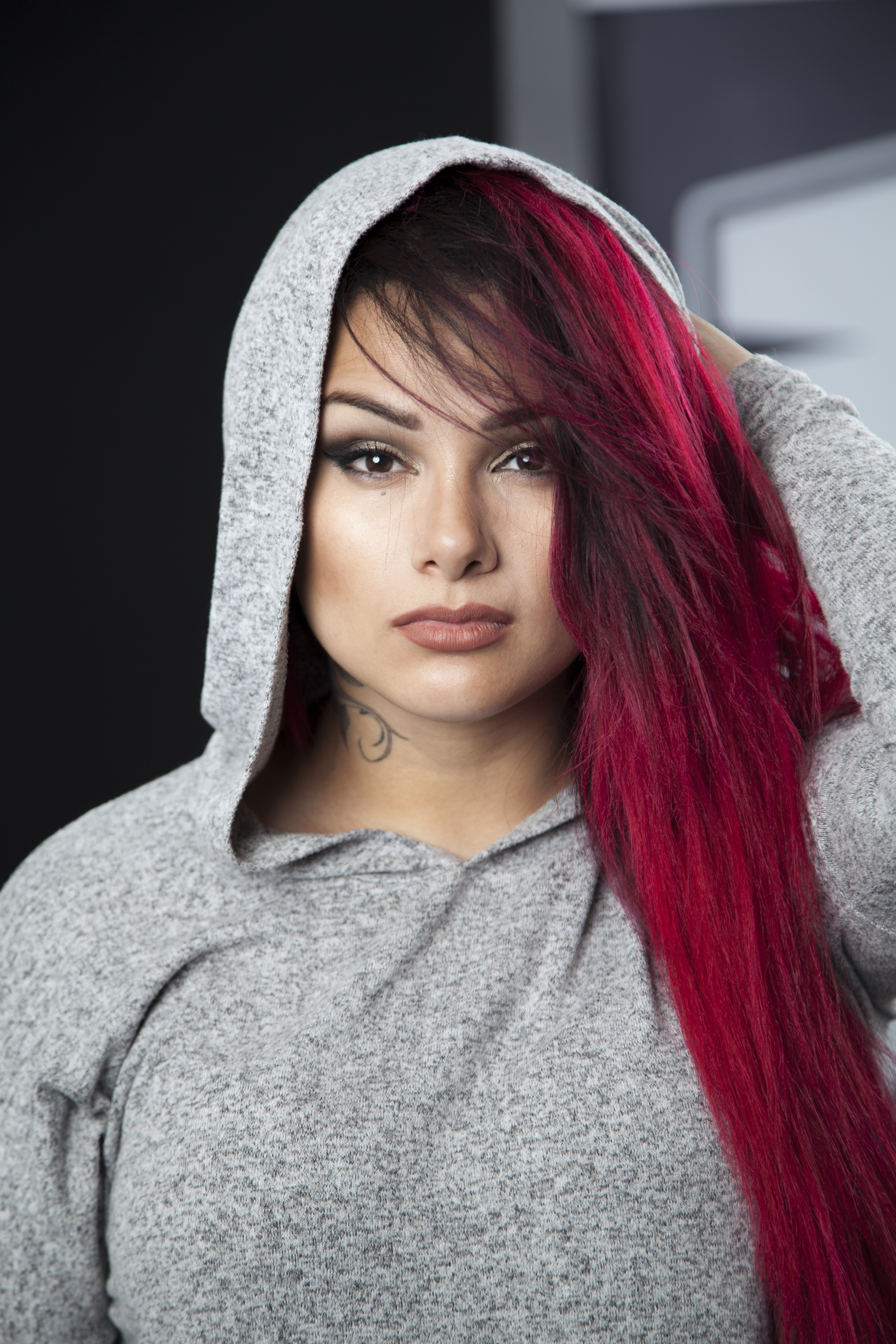
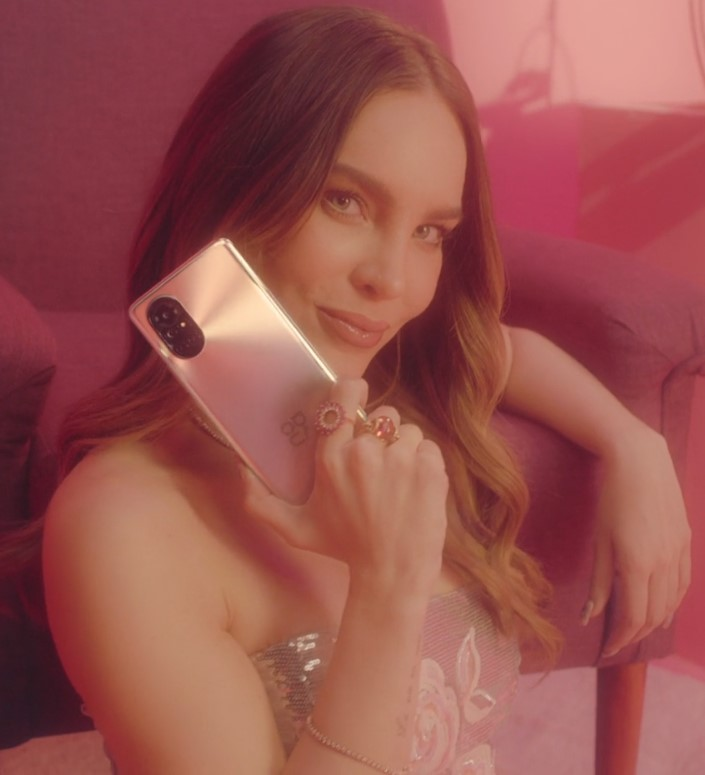
Snow Tha Product (left) and Belinda (right) covered the song in 2025

Belinda and Snow Tha Product covered the song in 2025. Their version features a tumbado style with urban, pop and hip-hop influences. It was recorded for Somos frijoleros, a tribute album of songs by Molotov, published by Warner Music.

The music video is also animated, but it has a vaporwave style, featuring a neon art aestethic, which Glamour described as combining "glitch art, street art graffiti, the black outlines of comic books, and the rebellious, futuristic atmosphere of cyberpunk".

Ana Paula Vázquez of the El Heraldo de México wrote positively about the cover. She considered it significant that two women addressed an issue not limited to a specific gender, noting that protest songs are typically performed by men. Online users gave the cover version mixed reactions, questioning whether "Frijolero" had to be reinterpreted.
