= The New Sound of the Venezuelan Gozadera =

Studio album by Los Amigos Invisibles
- Released: March 24, 1998
- Genre: Funk, Dance, Disco, Latin
- Label: Luaka Bop
- Producer: Andres Levin

Los Amigos Invisibles chronology
A Typical and Autoctonal Venezuelan Dance Band (1995)	The New Sound of the Venezuelan Gozadera (1998)	Arepa 3000 (2000)

Professional ratings
Review scores
Source	Rating
AllMusic	3/5 stars
Robert Christgau	C+
Los Angeles Times	3/4 stars

The New Sound of the Venezuelan Gozadera is an album by the Venezuelan band Los Amigos Invisibles, released in 1998.

== Critical reception ==
The Sun Sentinel called the album "dance music as self-referentially playful and goofy as anything the B-52s have ever recorded." Robert Christgau thought that "as members of the international brotherhood of bored middle-class collegians, their specialty is crappy music with a concept."

The Washington Post concluded that "in addition to strolling bass, percolating congas, squawking sax and cooing female back-up vocals, the group incorporates hip-hop tricks into such tracks as 'No Me Pagan'." The Los Angeles Times determined that "sex and American funk are this Venezuelan sextet's obsessions, and they are fused in a cheeky U.S. debut album filled with wacky disco references and quasi-pornographic lyrics."

== Track listing ==
1. "Güelcome"
2. "Ultra-Funk"
3. "Mi Linda"
4. "Sexy"
5. "Las Lycras del Avila"
6. "Groupie"
7. "Otra Vez"
8. "Cachete A Cachete"
9. "Balada De Chusy"
10. "Asomacho"
11. "Ponerte En Cuatro"
12. "Mango Cool"
13. "Nerio Compra Contestadora"
14. "Quiero Desintegar A Tu Novio"
15. "El Disco Anal"
16. "No Me Pagan"
17. "Cha-Chaborro"
18. "Aldemaro En Su Camaro"
19. "The New Sound of the Venezuelan Gozadera"
