= Apocalypshit =

Studio album by Molotov
- Released: September 14, 1999
- Length: 51:42
- Label: Surco
- Producers: Mario Caldato Jr.; Gustavo Santaolalla

Molotov chronology
| Molomix (1998) | Apocalypshit (1999) | Dance and Dense Denso (2003) |

Singles from Apocalypshit
- 1. "Parásito" Released: 1999; 2. "Rastaman-Dita" Released: 2000

Professional ratings
Review scores
| Source | Rating |
|---|---|
| Allmusic | 4.5/5 stars |

Apocalypshit is the second studio album by the Mexican band Molotov produced by Mario Caldato, Jr. The album was released in September 1999 on Surco Records. Apocalypshit was the first Molotov album to be released in the US.

== Track listing ==
| No. | Title | Writer(s) | Length |
|---|---|---|---|
| 1. | "No Manches Mi Vida" | Miguel Ángel Huidobro Preciado | 3:30 |
| 2. | "Karmara" | Ismael Fuentes de Garay | 3:44 |
| 3. | "Polkas Palabras" | Juan Francisco Ayala Gonzalez | 3:23 |
| 4. | "Step Off" | Randall Ebright | 3:23 |
| 5. | "Apocalypshit" | Huidobro | 4:07 |
| 6. | "Ñero" | Ayala | 3:28 |
| 7. | "Kuleka's Choice" | Fuentes | 4:16 |
| 8. | "Rastaman-Dita" | Huidobro | 3:48 |
| 9. | "Parásito" | Ayala | 3:37 |
| 10. | "Undertow" | Ebright | 3:28 |
| 11. | "Exorsimio" | Huidobro | 3:55 |
| 12. | "Let It Roll" | Ebright | 3:53 |
| 13. | "El Mundo" (Contains untitled hidden track) | Gilberto Gutierrez; Fuentes | 7:10 |
| Total length: | | | 51:42 |

== Appearances in popular culture ==
In 2001, the song "Polkas Palabras" was used as a soundtrack for the motion picture The Fast and the Furious, when Brian breaks into Hector's garage, while he is having a party.

In 2005 songs by Molotov were used in the Eidos video game Total Overdose.

The song "Apocalypshit" is featured in the 2007 video game Crackdown.

In 2008, the song "Apocalypshit" was used in the pilot of Breaking Bad, "Pilot", during the final scene where Walt and Jesse escape from the cook site in the desert.

== Charts ==
Weekly chart performance for Apocalypshit
| Chart (1999) | Peak position |
|---|---|
| Swiss Albums (Schweizer Hitparade) | 49 |

== Sales and certifications ==
| Region | Certification | Certified units/sales |
|---|---|---|
| Mexico (AMPROFON) | Platinum | 150,000^{^} |
| Spain (Promusicae) | Gold | 50,000^{^} |
^{^} Shipments figures based on certification alone.
