= Not So Commercial =

EP by Los Amigos Invisibles
- Released: March 15, 2011
- Genres: Electronica, Latin pop, Latin rock, Dance
- Length: 24:36
- Label: Nacional Records

Los Amigos Invisibles chronology
Commercial (2009)	Not So Commercial (2011)	Repeat After Me (2013)

Professional ratings
Review scores
Source	Rating
AllMusic	4/5 stars

Not So Commercial is the seventh studio album recorded by Venezuelan band Los Amigos Invisibles. Released on 15 March 2011, it was nominated in the Best Latin Pop, Rock or Urban Album category at the 2012 Grammy Awards.

== Track listing ==
This information adapted from AllMusic.

No.	Title	Writer(s)	Length
1.	"G-String"	Mauricio Arcas, José Luis Pardo	03:08
2.	"Youlikedat"	Mauricio Arcas, José Luis Pardo	00:59
3.	"Corduroy"	Mauricio Arcas, José Luis Pardo	03:35
4.	"Easy Going"	José Luis Pardo	01:02
5.	"Dubi Dubi Dubi"	José Luis Pardo	01:02
6.	"La Lluvia Sabe Que No Andas Sola"	Briceño, José Luis Pardo	04:55
7.	"Sweet"	Briceño, Figueredo, José Luis Pardo	05:03
8.	"Criticar"	Mauricio Arcas, José Luis Pardo	04:52
