= Ljubljana Hippodrome =

Horse racing stadium in Ljubljana, Slovenia

Coordinates: 46.085644°N 14.525246°E

Ljubljana Hippodrome (Slovene: Hipodrom Ljubljana) or Stožice Hippodrome (Slovene: Hipodrom Stožice), a horse racecourse stadium in the capital of Slovenia, is the main sport venue of this kind in the country. It is only 3 kilometres north from the center of Ljubljana. It was built in 1957. It is the seat of 'Horse Club Ljubljana'.

== Events ==
- In 1996, Pope John Paul II had Mass in front of 150,000 people, which is the biggest crowd in Slovenia ever.
- On 8 August 1997 American pop-star Michael Jackson planned to perform here a concert as part of his HIStory World Tour. The concert was cancelled due to low ticket sales.
- In 2009, The Killers performed in the Hippodrome in front of 30,000 people, as a part of their Day & Age Tour.
- In 2009, Madonna was scheduled to have a Sticky & Sweet Tour concert, but it was cancelled. According to Slovenian media only 7,000 out of 63,000 tickets were sold.

== Sources ==
- http://www.hipodrom-lj.si/index.php?klik=-oklubu (in Slovene)
