= The Venezuelan Zinga Son, Vol. 1 =

Studio album by Los Amigos Invisibles
- Released: May 4, 2004
- Genres: Funk, Dance, Disco
- Label: Luaka Bop

Los Amigos Invisibles chronology
Arepa 3000 (2000)	The Venezuelan Zinga Son, Vol. 1 (2004)	Super Pop Venezuela (2006)

Professional ratings
Review scores
Source	Rating
AllMusic	3.5/5 stars

The Venezuelan Zinga Son, Vol. 1 is an album released by Venezuelan band Los Amigos Invisibles in 2002 (Long Lost Brother Records) and 2004 (Luaka Bop). It was produced by "Little" Louie Vega and Kenny "Dope" González of Masters at Work, except track #13, produced by Dimitri from Paris.

== Track listing ==
Venezuelan edition (Released 2003)

1. "Rico Pa' Goza'"
2. "Comodón Johnson"
3. "Una Disco Llena"
4. "Venezuelan Zinga Son"
5. "Playa Azul"
6. "Ease Your Mind"
7. "Isyormain"
8. "Gerundio"
9. "Ojos Cerrando"
10. "Esto Es Lo Que Hay"
11. "Majunche"
12. "Mambo Chimbo"
13. "Diablo"
14. "Calne"
15. "Superfucker"
16. "Bruja"
17. "Las Gorditas De Mario"

+Hidden track, a.k.a. "Comodón Johnson (Reprise)"

U.S. Version (Released June 2004) as an enhanced CD

1. "Rico Pa' Goza'"
2. "Comodón Johnson"
3. "Una Disco Llena"
4. "Venezuelan Zinga Son"
5. "Playa Azul"
6. "Ease Your Mind"
7. "Isyormain"
8. "Gerundio"
9. "Ojos Cerrando"
10. "Esto Es Lo Que Hay"
11. "Majunche"
12. "Mambo Chimbo"
13. "Diablo"
14. "Calne"
15. "Superfucker"
16. "Bruja"
