= A Typical and Autoctonal Venezuelan Dance Band =

Studio album by Los Amigos Invisibles
- Released: 10 December 1995
- Genres: Funk, dance, disco
- Label: EMI

Los Amigos Invisibles chronology
A Typical and Autoctonal Venezuelan Dance Band (1995)	The New Sound of the Venezuelan Gozadera (1998)

A Typical and Autoctonal Venezuelan Dance Band is the debut album by the Venezuelan band Los Amigos Invisibles, released in 1995.

The cover logo was designed by José Andrés Blanco, the lead singer of King Changó. David Byrne, who later signed the band to his label, was first attracted to the album cover.

== Track listing ==
1. "Dame tu Color"
2. "En El Cielo o En Tu Boca"
3. "Díme"
4. "El Humo Que Respiro Cuando Estoy Contigo"
5. "Nada Que Decir"
6. "Siente"
7. "Biicuaiet"
8. "Vuelo Hasta Tus Pies"
9. "Guffi's Mix"
10. "Encántame"
11. "Pelusa"
12. "Dialecto Divino"
13. "Porno Song"
14. "¿En Dónde Está Lo Bello?"
15. "Mauri's Mix"
16. "Acid Jazz De Las Mujeres Locas"
17. "Más Dulce"
18. "Boogaloo Pa' Los Panas"
19. "Vámonos"
20. "Última Pieza"
