= Molomix =

Remix album by Molotov
- Released: November 24, 1998
- Length: 45:39
- Label: Surco

Molotov chronology
¿Dónde Jugarán Las Niñas? (1997)	Molomix (1998)	Apocalypshit (1999)

Professional ratings
Review scores
Source	Rating
AllMusic	link

Molomix is an album by the Mexican band Molotov. It is a remix album of their previous production ¿Dónde Jugarán Las Niñas?. It also includes two new songs: "El Carnal de las Estrellas", which is an attack to the Mexican broadcasting company Televisa after its denial to run their music videos, and "Rap, Soda y Bohemia" (their version of "Bohemian Rhapsody"), which was also included on a compilation album titled Tributo a Queen. It also includes two videos, listed as songs 11 and 12.

== Track listing ==
1. "El Carnal de las Estrellas (Intro)" – 4:44
2. "Puto (Mijangos Hard Mix)" – 7:00
3. "Gimme tha Power (Urban Mix)" – 3:53
4. "Cerdo (Porcino Mix)" – 3:38
5. "Voto Latino Remix" – 2:57
6. "Puto (M+M Electrónic Dub)" – 6:04
7. "Cerdo Radio Mix" – 2:45
8. "Gimme Tha Power (Drum'n Bass Mix)" – 3:42
9. "Puto (MD Extended Mix) / "Chinga Tu Madre" – 6:59
10. "Rap, Soda y Bohemia" – 4:03
11. "Puto (Video)"
12. "Que no te haga bobo Jacobo (Video)"
