= Los Amigos Invisibles =

Venezuelan Band

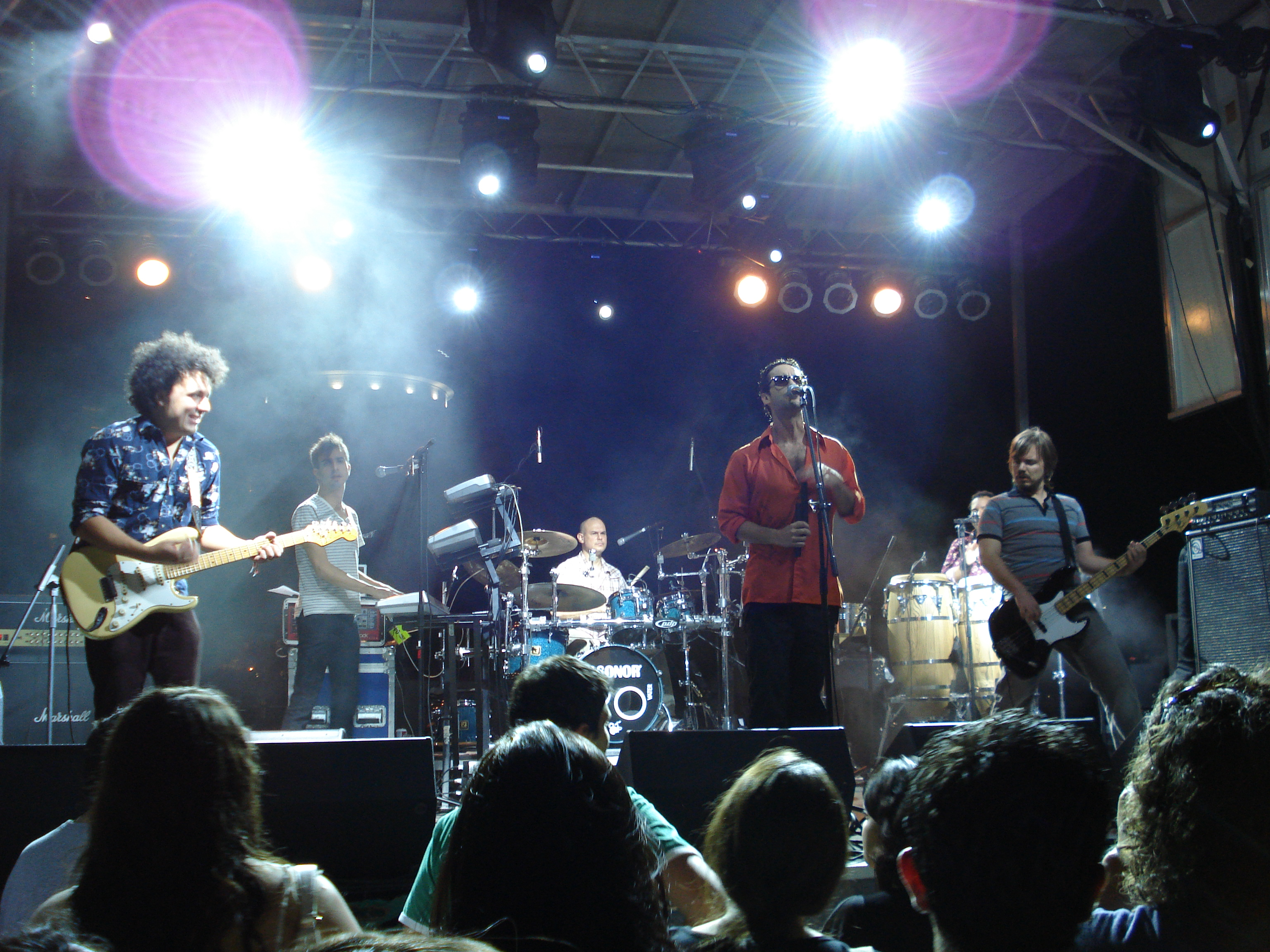

Background information
- Origin: Venezuela
- Genres: Acid jazz; disco; funk
- Years active: 1987–present
- Labels: EMI; Luaka Bop; Gozadera; Nacional
- Members: Julio Briceño; José Rafael Torres; Juan Manuel Roura
- Past members: Armando Figueredo; José Luis Pardo; Mauricio Arcas
- Website: amigosinvisibles.com

Los Amigos Invisibles (Spanish for "The Invisible Friends") is a Venezuelan band which plays a blend of disco, acid jazz and funk mixed with Latin rhythms. In addition to releasing eleven critically acclaimed albums, the band have been lauded internationally for their explosive live shows, spanning nearly 60 countries. They are considered the Venezuelan band with the greatest international recognition.

== History ==
In 1995, EMI released their debut album, A Typical and Autoctonal Venezuelan Dance Band, which was a huge success in their home country, enabling them to sell out clubs around Caracas for the next couple of years. In 1996, David Byrne's Luaka Bop record label signed the group after discovering a CD they had planted in a New York City record store. Shortly thereafter, they went into the studio to work on their sophomore record, The New Sound of the Venezuelan Gozadera, which was released in 1998.

Two years later and under the direction of famed producer Philip Steir, they released Arepa 3000: A Venezuelan Journey into Space, which received a Grammy nomination in the category of Best Latin Alternative Album and a Latin Grammy for Best Rock Album.

Following the success of this release, the band relocated to New York City and began work on The Venezuelan Zinga Son, Vol. 1, produced by "Little" Louie Vega of Masters at Work. Initially, the album was released in the UK and Japan through Long Lost Brothers Records, although a year later Luaka Bop released the album in the US, resulting in another Latin Grammy nomination in the category of Best Alternative Latin Album.

After ending their recording contract with Luaka Bop, Los Amigos Invisibles started their own label, Gozadera Records. The first release, Chill Out Venezuela, was a multiple-genre collection of Venezuelan artists, produced by Los Amigos Invisibles. For Gozadera's next release and the band's fifth studio album, they enlisted Dimitri from Paris to produce a collection of Venezuelan cover songs entitled Super Pop Venezuela, which was initially offered in their native country only. In 2006, the album was released in the US, landing the band another Grammy nomination, for Best Urban Latin Alternative Album.

After three more years, Los Amigos Invisibles released their album Commercial, in a joint production between Gozadera Records and Nacional Records. In an interview with America's National Public Radio, the band explained that the change in style was not by accident, nor was the decision to name the latest project Commercial. Rather, it was a tongue-in-cheek reference to band's former musical self. The release was a hit in Venezuela, debuting at #1 on the music charts. During the week of July 7, 2009, their song "Vivire Para Ti" featuring Natalia Lafourcade was offered as Single of the Week in the iTunes music store and in November 2009, Commercial won the Latin Grammy for Best Alternative Music Album. Following their Grammy win, 2010 saw festival appearances and shows throughout the United States, Latin America, Europe, Australia and New Zealand.

In 2011, the band released Not So Commercial, an EP of outtakes from the Commercial album. This album was a nominee for the Grammy Award for Best Latin Pop, Rock or Urban Album in 2012.

In April 2013, Repeat After Me was released. This album received a Grammy nomination in the category of Best Latin Alternative Album and a Latin Grammy for Best Alternative Album, Song of the Year, and Best Cover. In 2014, the band were named Pop Artist of the Year at the Pepsi Venezuela Music Awards. That year, keyboardist Armando Figueredo and guitarist José Luis Pardo (Cheo) left the band. Both were original members.

In 2015, the band released Acústico, a compilation of their greatest hits played in an acoustic style.

2017 saw the release of the album El Paradise. This was followed by a concert tour in the United States. In 2019 they won a Latin Grammy Award again, this time in the category Best Alternative Song for the song "Tócamela".

== Band members ==
=== Current members ===
- Julio Briceño (a.k.a. "Chulius", vocals, percussion, songwriting)
- José Rafael Torres (a.k.a. "Catire", bass, songwriting)
- Juan Manuel Roura (a.k.a. "Mamel", or "Mamulo," drums, percussion, songwriting)

=== Former members ===
- Armando Figueredo (a.k.a. "Armandito", keyboards, background vocals)
- José Luis Pardo (a.k.a. "Cheo" or "DJ Afro", guitar)
- Mauricio Arcas (a.k.a. "Maurimix", percussion, background vocals)

== Awards and nominations ==
=== Grammy Awards ===
Year	Nominee / work	Award	Result
43rd Annual Grammy Awards	Arepa 3000	Best Latin Rock or Alternative Album	Nominated
49th Annual Grammy Awards	Superpop Venezuela	Best Latin Rock, Alternative or Urban Album	Nominated
54th Annual Grammy Awards	Not So Commercial	Best Latin Pop	Nominated
56th Annual Grammy Awards	Repeat After Me	Best Latin Rock, Urban or Alternative Album	Nominated
60th Annual Grammy Awards	El Paradise	Best Latin Rock, Urban or Alternative Album	Nominated

=== Latin Grammy Awards ===
Year	Nominee / work	Award	Result
2nd Annual Latin Grammy Awards	Arepa 3000	Best Rock Album by a Duo or Group with Vocal	Nominated
6th Annual Latin Grammy Awards	The Venezuelan Zinga Son, Vol. 1	Best Alternative Music Album	Nominated
10th Annual Latin Grammy Awards	Commercial	Best Alternative Music Album	Won
14th Annual Latin Grammy Awards	José Luis Pardo — "La Que Me Gusta"	Song of the Year	Nominated
14th Annual Latin Grammy Awards	Masa — Repeat After Me	Best Recording Package	Nominated
20th Annual Latin Grammy Awards	David Julca, Jonathan Julca, Los Amigos Invisibles, Silverio Lozada and Servando Primera — Tócamela	Best Alternative Song	Won

== Discography ==
- A Typical and Autoctonal Venezuelan Dance Band (1995)
- The New Sound of the Venezuelan Gozadera (1998)
- Arepa 3000: A Venezuelan Journey into Space (2000)
- The Venezuelan Zinga Son, Vol. 1 (2003)
- Super Pop Venezuela (2005)
- Super Pop Venezuela, Remixes (2008)
- En una noche tan linda como ésta (2008)
- Commercial (2009)
- Not So Commercial (2011)
- Repeat After Me (2013)
- Acústico (2015)
- El Paradise (2017)
- Cool Love (2022)
