= Una Hora a Tokyo =

Una Hora A Tokyo

Studio album by Airbag
- Released: 11 October 2008
- Genre: Rock
- Label: Warner Music Latina

Airbag chronology
Blanco y Negro (2006)	Una Hora A Tokyo (2008)	Voragine (2011)

Una Hora A Tokyo is the third album by Argentine rock band Airbag. It was released on 11 October 2008. The album received a Latin Grammy Award nomination for Best Rock Vocal Album, Duo or Group. It was released by Warner Music Group in Argentina, Colombia and Mexico. to their first two albums, Una Hora a Tokyo was not a success commercially, since they changed direction and style, turning from pop and teen songs (as in their two predecessors) to more rock and more complex arrangements, and with another sound. Guido Sardelli in live performances, he left the drums and played the second guitar and sang vocals. A national tour was made in 2008 as a promotion, although the album took several months to come out. The album was presented with a tour that began in October 2008 and ended in October 2009.

== Track listing ==
The songs were composed by Patricio Sardelli, Guido Sardelli and Gastón Sardelli.

1. ¿Revolución?
2. Mi Sensación
3. Una Hora a Tokio
4. Noches de Abril
5. Lo Sentirás
6. Lejos del Sol
7. Ella No Está
8. Un Día Diferente
9. Dulce Condena
10. Algo en mi Mente
11. Sinfonía Eléctrica
12. Blues
