= Arepa 3000 =

Studio album by Los Amigos Invisibles
- Released: September 12, 2000
- Genres: Funk, dance, disco, merengue, salsa, rumba, rock en español
- Label: Luaka Bop

Los Amigos Invisibles chronology
The New Sound of the Venezuelan Gozadera (1998)	Arepa 3000 (2000)	The Venezuelan Zinga Son, Vol. 1 (2003)

Professional ratings
Review scores
Source	Rating
AllMusic	4/5 stars

Arepa 3000 is a studio album by acid jazz band Los Amigos Invisibles. It was released in 2000 on Luaka Bop.

== Track listing ==
No.	Title	Length
1.	"Intro"
2.	"Arepa 3000"
3.	"La Vecina"
4.	"Qué Rico"
5.	"Cuchi Cuchi"
6.	"Si Estuvieras Aquí"
7.	"Masturbation Session"
8.	"Mami Te Extraño"
9.	"Mujer Policía"
10.	"No Le Metas Mano"
11.	"Amor"
12.	"Pipí"
13.	"El Barro"
14.	"Domingo Echao"
15.	"Piazo E' Perra"
16.	"El Baile Del Sobón"
17.	"Fonnovo"
18.	"Caliente"
19.	"Llegaste Tarde"
