= Black Drawing Chalks =

Brazilian rock band

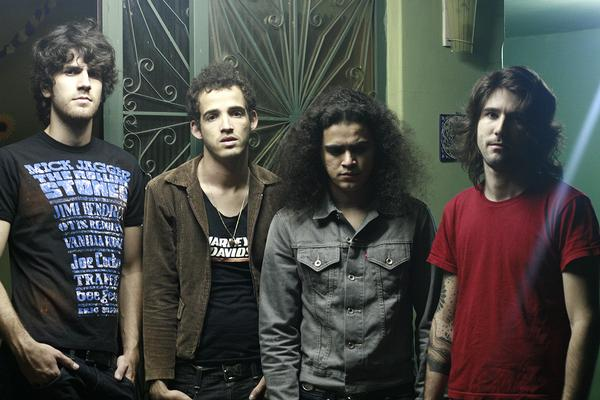

Background information
- Origin: Goiânia, Goiás, Brazil
- Genres: Hard rock, Stoner rock
- Years active: 2005–present
- Labels: Monstro Records
- Members: Edimar Filho; Victor Rocha; Denis de Castro; Douglas de Castro
- Past members: Marco Bauer; Renato Cunha
- Website: BlackDrawingChalks.com

Black Drawing Chalks is a Brazilian rock band from Goiânia, Goiás, Brazil, formed in 2005, by a group of graphic design students.

== History ==
Black Drawing Chalks began with Victor Rocha and Douglas Castro, which were working and studying together, added to Castro’s brother, Denis, in 2005. By that time, Rocha used to share the vocal tracks with Marco Bauer, who decided to leave the band in 2007, after recording their first album. Bauer was replaced by Renato Cunha on the guitar. The name of the band refers to a German brand of writing tools.

In 2007 they released their first album, Big Deal. After the release, the band started to play gigs around Brazil and played along with bands like Nashville Pussy, The Datsuns, Motörhead and Eagles of Death Metal.

After touring in Canada, in 2009, the band released their second album, Life is a Big Holiday For Us. Counting on a big attention from the media, the band was nominated to three awards in MTV VMB, the Brazilian version of MTV Video Music Awards.

The band performed at the SXSW Music and Film Festival in Austin, Texas in 2013. Louder Than Hell Interview, March 2013.

== Members ==
- Victor Rocha – vocals and guitar
- Edimar Filho – guitar
- Denis de Castro – bass
- Douglas de Castro – drums

== Discography ==
- Big Deal (2007)
- Life Is a Big Holiday for Us (2009)
- Live in Goiânia (2010)
- No Dust Stuck On You (2012)
