= Dance and Dense Denso =

Studio album by Molotov
- Released: February 25, 2003
- Recorded: Fall 2002
- Studios: Larabee Studios, LA
- Genres: Latin rock; punk
- Length: 38:08
- Label: Universal Latino
- Producer: Gustavo Santaolalla

Molotov chronology
Apocalypshit (1999)	Dance and Dense Denso (2003)	Con Todo Respeto (2004)

Singles from Dance and Dense Denso
- 1. "Frijolero" Released: 2002; 2. "Hit Me (Gimme Tha Power II)" Released: 2002; 3. "Here We Kum" Released: 2003

Dance and Dense Denso is the third studio album by Mexican band Molotov, released on February 25, 2003, through Universal Music Latino. It was produced by Argentine musician Gustavo Santaolalla.

The title of the album is in Spanglish, and can be very roughly translated as: "Dance and beat each other out (Dense) intensely (Denso)". The verb "Dar", is conjugated in an imperative mode of the third person plural. "Dense" is used in several places in Latin America meaning to engage in sexual intercourse, as well as to engage in a fight. Both the title and the cover-art are references to Moshing (slam-dancing), where participants push or slam into each other.

At the 4th Annual Latin Grammy Awards, the album was nominated for Best Rock Album by a Duo or Group with Vocal and "Frijolero" was nominated for Record of the Year and Best Rock Song and won Best Short Form Music Video, being the band's first Latin Grammy Award. The following year, at the 5th Annual Latin Grammy Awards, two other songs from the album received nominations, both "Here We Kum" and "Hit Me" were nominated for Best Rock Song, with the latter also being nominated for Best Short Form Music Video.

The album peaked at numbers 19 and 10 at the Top Latin Albums and Latin Pop Albums charts, respectively, being the first appearance of the band in the latter chart as well as their highest in the former. It was also certified gold in Mexico and Argentina.

== Background ==
The album was recorded from June to September 2002 at Larabee Studios in Los Angeles, United States, with Gustavo Santaolalla as producer and Aníbal Kerpel as associate producer, it was mixed by Robert Carranza at Soundcastle, also in United States, and features a cover designed by Edoardo Chavarín.

The album deals political issues similar to their debut album ¿Dónde Jugarán las Niñas? (1997), the band has said that "we returned to the idea of making songs with a background that affects a lot of people, but it's more hip hop, eighties funk", the album blends humor, with comical song titles such as "Changüich a la Chichona" and "No Me Da Mi Navidad (Punketon)" and social commentary in songs like "Frijolero" about the racism in United States towards Latin American immigrants, "I'm the One" about the difficulties in the relationships of parents and their children and "Que Se Caiga el Teatro" that criticises corruption in governments and politicians.

Namely, "Frijolero", which means "beaner" in Spanish, deals with the racism in United States, the use of slurs towards Latin Americans and the involvements of United States within international wars, with the song featuring the lines "escucha entonces cuando digo, no me llames Frijolero, y aunque exista algún respeto, y no metamos las narices, nunca inflamos la moneda, haciendo guerra a otros países" ("listen when I tell you, don't call me a beaner, and even if there is some respect and we don't stick our noses, we never inflate the currency by making wars with other countries"), making clear references to United States, according to the band "Frijolero is an absolutely despective word used by gringos towards Latinos". The music video for the song also reflects the critiques towards the country featuring American politicians like George W. Bush hugging the devil while bombs and oil containers fall from the sky. The song faced backlash and censorship from several American radio stations who censored some parts of the song, their label, Universal Music released a censored version of the song under the name "Frijolero (Propina Edit)".

== Critical reception ==
Professional ratings
Review scores
Source	Rating
Allmusic	4.5/5 stars
Orlando Weekly	Positive

John Bush from AllMusic gave the album four and a half stars out of five writing the with Dance and Dense Denso "it became clear that Molotov rated as one of the best in the rock en español movement's contemporary wing", he continued writing that ""Here We Kum" is a brilliant Spanglish jam, with an infectious singalong chorus ("Here we come and we don't care nacha!"), while the hilarious food-and-sex metaphors of "Changüich a la Chichona" ("I want to get down into your juju bees") show that Molotov have a good handle on tongue-in-cheek humor", the finished the review calling the album "one of the best Latin rock releases of the year".

== Track listing ==
No.	Title	Writer(s)	Length
1.	"Dance and Dense Denso"	Ismael Fuentes de Garay; Juan Francisco Ayala Gonzalez; Miguel Ángel Huidobro Preciado; Randall Ebright	1:52
2.	"Here We Kum"	Fuentes	4:14
3.	"Chandwich a la Chichona (sic)"	Ayala; Ebright	3:29
4.	"No Me Da Mi Navidad (Punketon)"	Ayala; Huidobro	4:38
5.	"Noko"	Fuentes	3:30
6.	"Frijolero"	Ayala; Huidobro; Ebright	3:30
7.	"E. Charles White"	Huidobro; Ayala	3:38
8.	"Queremos Pastel"	Huidobro	3:12
9.	"I'm the One"	Ebright	3:20
10.	"Nostradamus Mucho (Que Se Caiga El Teatro)"	Fuentes	2:25
11.	"Hit Me (Gimme Tha Power II)"	Huidobro	4:16
Total length:			38:08

== Charts ==
Weekly chart performance for Dance and Dense Denso
Chart (2003)	Peak position
US Top Latin Albums (Billboard)	19
US Latin Pop Albums (Billboard)	10

== Sales and certifications ==
Region	Certification	Certified units/sales
Argentina (CAPIF)	Gold	20,000^{^}
Mexico (AMPROFON)	Gold	75,000^{^}
^{^} Shipments figures based on certification alone.
