= Airbag (band) =

Argentine rock band

- Origin: Buenos Aires, Argentina
- Genres: Hard rock; progressive rock
- Years active: 1999–present
- Label: Warner
- Members: Patricio Sardelli; Gastón Sardelli; Guido Sardelli
- Website: airbag.la

Airbag is an Argentine hard rock band formed in Buenos Aires in 1999, consisting of three brothers: Patricio Sardelli (lead guitar, keyboards, vocals), Gastón Sardelli (bass, backing vocals), and Guido Sardelli (drums, rhythm guitar, vocals). They have released eight studio albums and two live albums, and tour mostly around Latin America.

== History ==
=== Beginnings (1999–2003) ===
Originally from Don Torcuato town in Buenos Aires Province, Airbag started by playing covers of songs by Deep Purple, the Beatles, Guns N' Roses, Chuck Berry, Green Day, and Blink 182. In 2003, they signed with Warner Music for the release of their self-titled debut album.

=== Blanco y Negro (2006) ===
At the beginning of 2006, Airbag traveled to Spain to record their second album, Blanco y Negro, which was presented at the Luna Park Stadium. The same year, they contributed the song "A Whole Life Waiting for You" to the soundtrack of the television series Alma Pirata.

=== Una Hora a Tokyo (2007–08) ===
In December 2007, Airbag started recording their third album, Una Hora a Tokyo. It released in 2008.

During this time, they entered into a legal conflict with their former manager and decided to break with their record label, Warner.

One of the first concerts they performed in promotion of their new album was at the ALAS solidarity festival with Shakira, Alejandro Sanz, and Calle 13.

=== Vorágine, Samsara (2011–12) ===
In an interview with Clarín's Yes! magazine, Patricio explained that they had composed close to 100 songs, of which twelve were selected for their next album, which the band released independently.

In August 2012, Airbag released a video for the song "Cae el Sol", directed by Patricio Sardelli and Gabriel Grieco.

=== Libertad (2013) ===
In November 2013, Airbag released their fifth studio album, Libertad. It spawned the singles "Por mil noches" and "Libertad".

The same year, Airbag contributed the song "Naturaleza Muerta" to the soundtrack of the film Still Life, which included a few appearances by Patricio.

=== Mentira La Verdad (2016–18) ===
In September 2016, Airbag published a new album, titled Mentira la Verdad. The first single was "Vivamos El Momento".

=== Al parecer todo ha sido una trampa (2019–present) ===
In 2019, Airbag opened for Muse at the Palermo Hippodrome in Buenos Aires.

In 2020, the band planned to release their new album, but due to the global COVID-19 pandemic, this was delayed.

The new record, titled Al Parecer Todo Ha Sido Una Trampa, was released on 15 October and included a song with Los Enanitos Verdes, called "Volver a casa".

== Band members ==
- Patricio Sardelli – vocals, guitar, keyboards
- Gastón Sardelli – bass, backing vocals
- Guido Sardelli – drums, rhythm guitar, backing vocals

== Discography ==
Studio albums

- Airbag (2004)
- Blanco Y Negro (2006)
- Una Hora a Tokyo (2008)
- Voragine (2011)
- Libertad (2013)
- Mentira La Verdad (2016)
- Al Parecer Todo Ha Sido Una Trampa (2021)
- El Club de la Pelea I (2025)

Live albums

- Samsara (2012)
- En Vivo, Estadio Vélez (2024)
