= Molotov (band) =

Mexican rock band

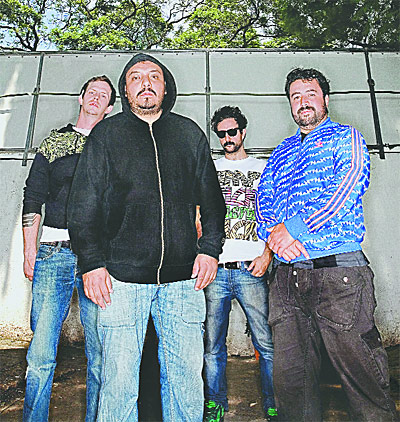
- Molotov for a photoshoot in 2008; From left to right: Randy Ebright, Paco Ayala, Tito Fuentes, and Micky Huidobro

Background information
- Origin: Mexico City, Mexico
- Genres: Rap metal; rock en español; political hip-hop
- Years active: 1995–present
- Label: Universal Music Latin Entertainment
- Members: Tito Fuentes; Micky Huidobro; Paco Ayala; Randy Ebright
- Past members: Jay de la Cueva; Iván Jared Moreno
- Website: www.molotovoficial.mx

Molotov is a Mexican rock band formed in Mexico City in 1995. Their lyrics, which are rapped and sung by all of their members, feature a mixture of Spanish and English. The band members switch instruments and roles depending on which song they are performing. Their lyrics are known for political satire and social criticism towards the Mexican government and society, which led them to be censored at the beginning of their career. Molotov are one of the best-selling Latin bands of all time, having sold more than four million copies of their albums worldwide. Described as one of the most irreverent Mexican rock bands, they are considered one of the best in contemporary rock en español.

== History ==
The band began in 1995 when two friends, Tito Fuentes (guitar) and Micky "Chicho" Huidobro (bass), started playing together. Javier “J” de la Cueva and Iván Jared "La Quesadillera" Moreno joined them in September of that year, becoming the first line up for the band. Moreno would eventually leave and be replaced by Randy Ebright, the only American member of the band, in October 1995. In February 1996, de la Cueva would also leave. He was replaced by Paco Ayala, establishing the four-member lineup that has remained consistent over the years.

Throughout 1996, the band played in many underground locations in Mexico City and began to gain a small group of fans. More success came when they opened for Héroes del Silencio in Monterrey and later for La Lupita in Puebla. During a concert at which they opened for Illya Kuryaki and The Valderramas, talent scouts from Universal Music Latin Entertainment offered them a record deal. It was a difficult period, with the band having to sell cassettes during their concerts while they prepared their debut album.

In July 1997, they released their debut album ¿Dónde Jugarán las Niñas? The album took its name partly from Maná's album ¿Dónde Jugarán los Niños? The album generated controversy because of its lyrics and cover, with stores refusing to sell it. Molotov went out to the street to sell their album as a form of protest. In 1998, they participated with the song "Payaso" in the album Volcán: Tributo a José José a tribute to legendary singer José José.

In 1998, Molotov released Molomix, an album with remixes of Donde Jugarán, including a version of the classic Queen song "Bohemian Rhapsody" titled "Rap, Soda y Bohemia", and a new song, "El Carnal de las estrellas", which attacks the Mexican television network Televisa as a response to its refusal to air the band's videos. In September 1999, Apocalypshit was released and the band toured Europe, including Russia, and were also a part of the 1999 Vans Warped Tour. In 2001, after a couple of years of touring, they took a rest and contributed to the soundtrack of the film Y tu mamá también. The soundtrack was nominated for a Latin Grammy.) They also worked on the soundtrack of the film Atlético San Pancho.

Molotov were part of the 2000 Watcha Tour, which included 17 shows with Los Enanitos Verdes, Aterciopelados, Café Tacuba, and A.N.I.M.A.L. In 2003, the band's new album, Dance and Dense Denso, was released and featured the Grammy-winning single "Frijolero", which became the band's biggest hit to date. In 2004, the band released Con Todo Respeto, which consisted of covers of groups such as The Misfits, Beastie Boys, ZZ Top, and Los Toreros Muertos.

On 18 January 2007, Molotov's official website addressed a separation rumor, saying that it could neither be confirmed or denied but that more information would be coming soon. A few weeks later, the band confirmed on its website that it would indeed be touring and posted dates starting on 3 April in Ventura, California, and ending on 15 April in Dallas, Texas. Despite no official break-up update, many radio stations announced the tour as Molotov's last. Later that year, the band released the album Eternamiente (a portmanteau of eternamente [eternally] and miente [he lies]) with the hit song "Yofo". The album saw first-week sales of nearly 1,000 copies.

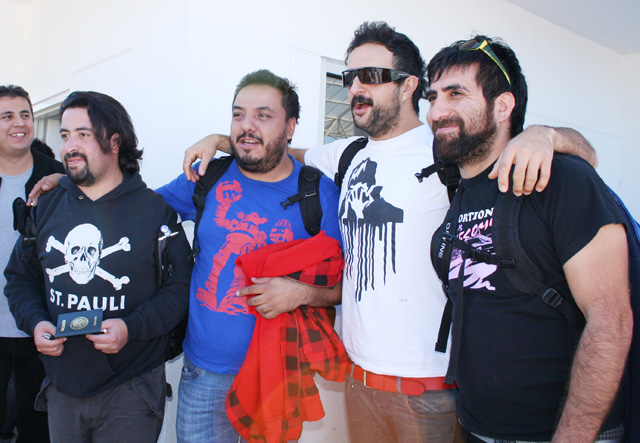
Molotov in November 2006

Molotov performed at the 2009 Coachella Music Festival. In an interview, the band talked about the possibility of releasing a live DVD. In a later interview, Ebright said the DVD would possibly be directed by Y tu mamá también director Alfonso Cuarón. The band's manager, Jorge Mondragón, has said that a book would be published recounting their 15 years as a band.

Band lead guitar Tito Fuentes said that their next album would be released independently during 2010. On 14 May 2010, it was announced that the band would perform at Mexico City's Zócalo for the first time in the band's history, having been denied the chance to play the venue in their hometown five times before. The band performed a concert along with other bands such as Jaguares and Maldita Vecindad to protest against Arizona's SB 1070 law. The band recorded their performance at the Creation of Peace Festival in Kazan in Russia. In May 2012, this was released as the live album Desde Rusia con amor, with an accompanying DVD. The band worked with Mexican film director Olallo Rubio, providing music for a documentary called Gimme the Power in which Rubio analyzes Mexico under the power of the Institutional Revolutionary Party. The documentary was released on 1 June 2012, a month before the 2012 Mexican general election was held.

== Music and lyrics ==
Molotov's lyrics include a mixture of politics, sex, and expletives with dark humour and social commentary which made it hard for Molotov to enter mainstream media. LGBT organisation GLAAD criticized the band for their song "Puto", which GLAAD categorised as being homophobic. Molotov's lead vocalist and guitarist Tito Fuentes responded to the controversy over the song by stating, "It's about cowards not homosexuals," further elaborating in regard to their lyricism, "We don't [care] about being politically correct. We respect the art of it. The expression."

Publications such as Vibe said that their music "is incendiary by nature [...] with poisoned darts aimed directly at the heart of the oppressive paternalism of the government". For example, the song "Gimme Tha Power" contained a line that literally translated to, "We have to rip out the problem by the roots and change the government of our country." These lyrics reflected aspects of the tumultuous political climate of the late 1990s. In 2000, the voting public in Mexico elected a president from a different political party than that which had held uninterrupted power since 1940.

Molotov's music incorporates elements of hip hop, funk, pop, disco, dance-pop and punk rock into their musical style, which has been classified as rock en español, rap metal, alternative rock, hard rock, post-grunge, nu metal, rap rock, and Latin rock.

== In popular culture ==
- In 2001, the song Polkas Palabras was featured in the soundtrack of the film The Fast and the Furious.
- In 2005, the songs Karmara, Step Off, El Mundo, Cerdo, Molotov Cocktail Party, Que No Te Haga Bobo Jacobo, Mátate Teté, No Manches Mi Vida and Apocalypshit were featured in the soundtrack of the game Total Overdose.
- In 2007, 10 songs by the band were featured in the video game Crackdown, and occasionally gang members can be seen wearing Molotov shirts.
- In 2008, the song Apocalypshit was used in the closing scene of the first episode of the crime drama series Breaking Bad.
- In 2018, the song Gimme Tha Power was featured in the episode "Cucaracha/K’uruch", the seventh episode of the second season of the crime drama television series Mayans M.C.
- In 2021, the song Here We Kum was featured in the radio soundtrack of Far Cry 6.

== Members ==
Note: The members alternate instruments depending on what song they are performing; the below list shows their main roles in the band.

Tito Fuentes

Ismael Fuentes de Garay Poeta (born 6 September 1974) is a guitarist, bassist, and vocalist for the band. Born in Mexico City to exiled parents from Barcelona after the Spanish Civil War, Fuentes was part of a rock group called La Candelaria after completing high school, of which fellow Molotov member Micky Huidobro was part of as well. His uncle, Alfonso de Garay, is one of the authors of the official anthem for the National Autonomous University of Mexico.

Micky Huidobro

Miguel Ángel Huidobro Preciado (born 11 January 1974) bassist, guitarist, drummer, and vocalist for the band. A Mexico City native, he is the younger brother of Francisco Huidobro, co-founder and lead guitarist of Fobia.

Paco Ayala

Juan Francisco Ayala (born 16 May 1977) bassist, guitarist, drummer, and vocalist for the band. Ayala began his career at a very young age, participating in children's groups until he turned 11 when he decided to become a musician. Before joining Molotov, Ayala collaborated with several bands and artists such as Kenny y los Eléctricos, César Costa, and Thalía. In 1995, the first national rock contest organised by Coca-Cola was held where Ayala, along with his band Perro Bomba placed 5th, the same contest where Molotov won 1st place. Finally, he joined Molotov in February 1996. He was the last to join the group as the fourth vocalist. Ayala is married to internet personality, Heydee Hofmann.

Randy Ebright

Randy Clifford Ebright Wideman (born 16 May 1977) is a drummer and a vocalist for the band, and sometimes plays the guitar and bass. Born in Ithaca, Michigan, his father worked in law enforcement with the Drug Enforcement Administration, having joined the agency in 1984. Upon his recuritment, Ebright and his parents moved and lived in Louisiana for several years until Ebright's father was assigned to work in Mexico City in 1992. Ebright completed his high school studies in Mexico but was introverted with few friends. As a result, he started playing the drums in his spare time. He participated in several bands of different musical styles until in 1995, Jay de la Cueva recruited him to join Molotov after the departure of Iván Jared Moreno from the band. Ebright has been in a relationship with Paraguayan actress and model Fiorella Migliore since 2017, and they have two children.

=== Current members ===
- Tito Fuentes – guitar, bass, vocals (1995–present, on hiatus since 2025)
- Micky Huidobro – bass, guitar, drums, vocals (1995–present)
- Paco Ayala – bass, guitar, drums, vocals (1996–present)
- Randy Ebright – drums, guitar, vocals (1995–present)

=== Past members ===
- Jay de la Cueva – bass, vocals (1995–1996, substitute for Tito Fuentes since 2025), guitar, drums (touring 2025)
- Iván Jared Moreno – drums (1995, guest in 2025)

=== Guest members ===
- Francisco Huidobro – guitar (1997–2000, 2004–2006, 2010–present)
- Gerardo Rodríguez – percussion (1997–2000)
- Gustavo Santaolalla – guitar (1995–1997)

== Discography ==
Studio albums

- ¿Dónde Jugarán las Niñas? (1997)
- Apocalypshit (1999)
- Dance and Dense Denso (2003)
- Eternamiente (2007)
- Agua Maldita (2014)
- Sólo D'Lira (2023)

Remix albums

- Molomix (1998)

Compilation albums

- Con Todo Respeto (2004)
- Exitos (2016)

Live albums

- Desde Rusia con Amor (2012)
- MTV Unplugged (2018)
- ¿Dónde Jugarán lxs Niñxs? (2019)

== Awards ==
Band awards:

- 1998: MTV Video Music Awards - International Viewer's Choice (Latin America, North and South): "Gimme Tha Power"
- 2003: MTV Video Music Awards Latinoamérica 2003 - Best Group or Duet, Best Alternative Artist, Best Artist from Mexico.
- 2004: Viña del Mar International Song Festival - Antorcha de Plata, Antorcha de Oro, Gaviota de Plata.

Dance and Dense Denso:

- Latin Grammy for Best Music Video (Frijolero).
- MTV Video Music Awards Latinoamérica 2003 for Video of the Year (Frijolero)

Con Todo Respeto:

- Latin Grammy for Best Rock Vocal Album, Duo or Group

Eternamiente:

- Latin Grammy for Best Rock Vocal Album, Duo or Group

Desde Rusia Con Amor:

- Latin Grammy for Best Rock Album 2012

"Agua Maldita"

- Latin Grammy 2014 Best Rock Vocal Album, Duo or Group

“Sólo D’ Lira”

- Latin Grammy 2023 Best Rock Album
