= Time Warner Cable Amphitheater =

Outdoor music venue in Cleveland, Ohio

Coordinates: 41°29′38.0″N 81°41′25.5″W

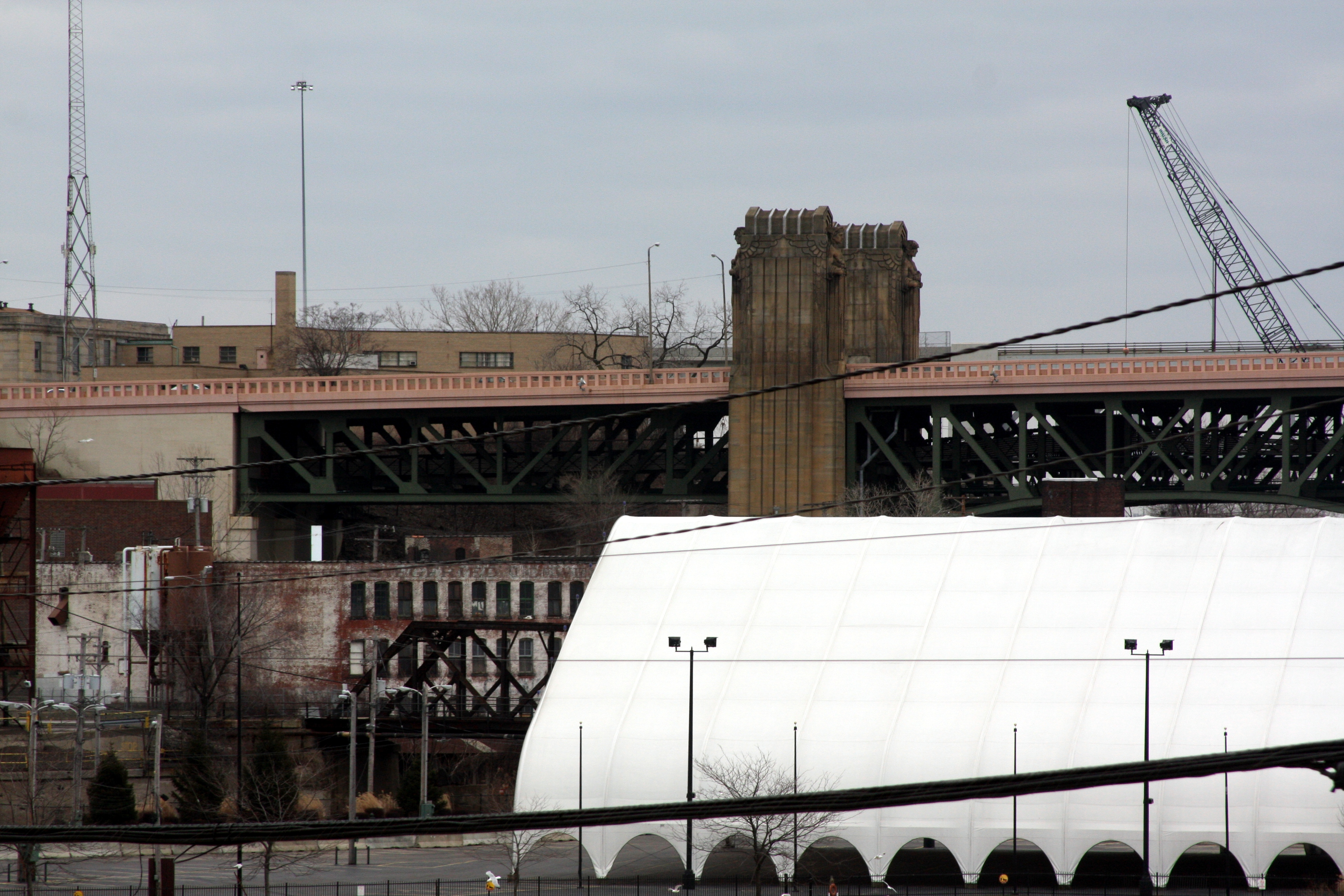
- The amphitheater sat near the Lorain–Carnegie Bridge. (c. 2012)
- Interactive map of Time Warner Cable Amphitheater
- Former names: Tower City Amphitheater (2001–2007)
- Address: 1887 W 3rd St; Cleveland, OH 44113-1444
- Owner: Forest City Enterprises
- Capacity: 5,000
- Type: amphitheater

Construction
- Opened: October 6, 2001
- Closed: March 31, 2011
- Demolished: 2012

The Time Warner Cable Amphitheater (formerly Tower City Amphitheater) was an outdoor concert venue and part of the mixed-use Tower City Center development in downtown Cleveland, Ohio.

The approximately 5,000-seat venue opened in 2001 and closed in March 2011 due to construction related to the Horseshoe Casino Cleveland. The structure later was used for covered parking until it was removed in April 2012.

With a location along the banks of the Cuyahoga River, the structure offered scenic views of the city lights and the river bridges. The amphitheater typically hosted 25–30 events per year, including festivals such as Great American Rib Cook-off and the Taste of Cleveland. Shows sometimes began as early as April and typically ran through September.

In 2006, the building played host to such acts as Chicago, Rob Zombie, Dave Chappelle and Alice Cooper.

Time Warner Cable Amphitheater was owned and operated by Live Nation, a company that also runs Jacobs Pavilion and Blossom Music Center.

== See also ==
- List of contemporary amphitheatres
