= Commercial (album) =

Studio album by Los Amigos Invisibles
- Released: June 9, 2009
- Genres: Electronica, Latin pop, Latin rock, Dance
- Length: 49:34
- Label: Gozadera Records

Los Amigos Invisibles chronology
En una noche tan linda como ésta (2008)	Commercial (2009)	Not So Commercial (2011)

Professional ratings
Review scores
Source	Rating
AllMusic	4/5 stars

Commercial is the sixth studio album recorded by Venezuelan band Los Amigos Invisibles released on June 9, 2009. In 2009 the album won the Latin Grammy Award for Best Alternative Music Album.

== Track listing ==
No.	Title	Writer(s)	Length
1.	"Fuerza"	José Luis Pardo	0:29
2.	"Mentiras"	Mauricio Arcas, José Luis Pardo	3:21
3.	"Vivire Para Ti"	Mauricio Arcas, José Luis Pardo	3:27
4.	"Desnudos"	José Luis Pardo	0:22
5.	"Sueño Erotico"	José Luis Pardo	4:02
6.	"Loco por Tu Amor"	Mauricio Arcas, José Luis Pardo	4:10
7.	"Burundanga"	José Luis Pardo	4:59
8.	"Plastic Woman"	José Luis Pardo	3:25
9.	"In Luv with U"	Armando Figueredo	4:05
10.	"Romantico Palman Izum"	José Luis Pardo	0:59
11.	"Como Sabes Tu"	José Luis Pardo	3:39
12.	"Merengue Killa"	Mauricio Arcas, José Luis Pardo	1:00
13.	"Dubi-Dubi"	José Luis Pardo	1:02
14.	"Oyeme Nena"	Mauricio Arcas, José Luis Pardo	4:26
15.	"Dulce"	Mauricio Arcas, José Luis Pardo	5:03
16.	"Es La Verdad"	Mauricio Arcas, José Luis Pardo	5:05
