= Polbo =

Rock band from Puerto Rico

- Origin: Humacao, Puerto Rico
- Genres: Alternative rock, Latin
- Years active: 1998–present
- Labels: Universal Music Latino, Warner/Chappell Music, Ojo de Tigre
- Members: Jorge Colón; Eric O. de la Cruz; André Hernández; Francisco Santiago Loza
- Past members: Alberto Colón; Ricardo Díaz; Eduardo Martínez; Josean Rosario; Harold Wendell Sanders; Jorge Bebo Rivera

Polbo is a rock en Español band from Puerto Rico. Its members are Jorge Colón (vocals, guitar), Eric O. de la Cruz (drums), André Hernández (bass), and Francisco Santiago Loza (guitar, vocals). Their debut album was nominated at the Latin Grammy Awards of 2006 for best rock album by a duo or group with vocal.

== Discography ==
- Polbo (CD+DVD)(2006)
- Limonada (CD)(2009)
- Demos 2001-2005 (12-inch LP)(2023)
- Polbo (7-inch EP)(2025)

== See also ==
- Puerto Rican rock
