= Eternamiente =

Compilation album by Molotov
- Released: October 16, 2007
- Genre: Thrash metal; funk; rap metal
- Length: 52:28
- Label: Universal Music Mexico
- Producer: Molotov

Molotov chronology
| Con Todo Respeto (2004) | Eternamiente (2007) | Desde Rusia Con Amor (2012) |

Professional ratings
Review scores
| Source | Rating |
|---|---|
| Allmusic | 3/5 stars |

Eternamiente (Eternal-lie) is Molotov's fifth album, which was released October 16, 2007. It's a compilation of four EPs, each one made by a member of the band individually, plus two new tracks. The EPs were released in the band's website and there was an online poll where the fans could vote for their favorite EP.

These EPs are Hasta la basura se separa by Micky Huidobro, El Plan de Ayala by Paco Ayala, Sintitolo by Tito Fuentes and Miss Canciones by Randy Ebright, each one containing 4 songs. The EPs' music vary in style, with Hasta la Basura Se Separa consisting of thrash metal and Miss Canciones consisting of rap metal.

The song title Eternamiente is a play on the words "eternally" and "lie", and can be roughly translated as Eternalie. The title of the song "Huidos need no education" is a reference to the line "we don't need no education" of the song "Another Brick In the Wall Pt. II" by British band Pink Floyd.

Although each member carried out their works separately, Randy Ebright participated in the four projects. Tito Fuentes did so in some songs.

This album received a Latin Grammy Award for Best Rock Vocal Album, Duo or Group at the Latin Grammy Awards of 2008.

== Track list ==
| No. | Title | Writer(s) | Length |
|---|---|---|---|
| 1. | "No Deje Que El Peje Lo Apendeje" | Micky Huidobro | 3:36 |
| 2. | "Eternamiente Molotov" | Huidobro | 2:22 |
| 3. | "Hasta La Basura Se Separa" | Huidobro | 4:12 |
| 4. | "Huidos Needs No Education" | Huidobro | 3:04 |
| 5. | "Déjate Algo" | Paco Ayala | 3:15 |
| 6. | "No Me Moleste Nadie" | Ayala | 3:29 |
| 7. | "Fiel Por Feo (FXF)" | Ayala | 4:13 |
| 8. | "Bien" | Ayala | 3:54 |
| 9. | "Yofo" | Tito Fuentes | 3:31 |
| 10. | "DDT" | Fuentes | 3:36 |
| 11. | "Yase" | Fuentes | 2:55 |
| 12. | "Por?" | Fuentes | 2:39 |
| 13. | "Sentido Común" | Randy Ebright | 2:41 |
| 14. | "Blame Me" | Ebright | 2:51 |
| 15. | "Guácala Q Rico" | Ebright | 3:27 |
| 16. | "Watts" | Ebright | 2:55 |
| 17. | "Eternamiente Molotov" (Acoustic) | Huidobro | 4:03 |
| 18. | "Girls Singing" | Ebright | 0:43 |
| Total length: | | | 52:28 |
