= Paradise (Brandon Flowers song) =

Single by Brandon Flowers

from the album Thrasher
- Released: July 17, 2026
- Recorded: July 2025
- Studio: RCA Studio A (Nashville, Tennessee); June Audio (Provo, Utah)
- Genre: Country; americana
- Length: 3:46
- Label: Island
- Songwriter: Brandon Flowers
- Producers: Jonathan Rado; Shawn Everett; Jed Jones

Brandon Flowers singles chronology
"Plans" (2026)	"Paradise" (2026)	"Tiger's Blood" (2026)

Music videos
- "Paradise (Live From Historic RCA Studio A)" on YouTube; "Paradise (Official Lyric Video)" on YouTube

"Paradise" is a song by American singer-songwriter Brandon Flowers, frontman of rock group the Killers, from his third solo studio album Thrasher (2026). The song was released as the second single from the album on July 17, 2026, to mostly positive reviews. "Paradise", written by Flowers, features production work from Jed Jones, Jonathan Rado, and Shawn Everett.

== Background and composition ==
"Paradise" was recorded at RCA Studio A in Nashville, Tennessee and June Audio in Provo, Utah in July 2025. The title of the song is a direct reference to the town of the same name that contains the Las Vegas Strip. Flowers stated that "Paradise" was written "about an ageing valet parker named Parker" and draws from his "extended family working and aging in the casino ecosystem of Vegas". Flowers told NME:

My uncles and cousins raised families on their wages from the casinos: from bellmen to valet parkers to people that worked in the food industry. That was their lifeblood. It wasn’t that far-fetched, but the idea was that I wanted to work at a nice place – The Bellagio, The Wynn or something like that.

"Paradise" features musicians such as pedal steel player Bruce Bouton, former TCB Band keyboardist Bobby Ogdin, and Bob Dylan harmonica player Charlie McCoy, and makes use of "galloping banjo, keening steel guitar, and country-honkin' harmonica." The song was produced by Jed Jones, as well as Jonathan Rado and Shawn Everett, who produced the Killers' Imploding the Mirage (2020) and Pressure Machine (2021), and has a runtime of 3 minutes and 46 seconds.

== Release and reception ==
Flowers revealed the release date and cover art for the single in a social media post on July 13. In the post, he announced that he would be "returning [Phil Collins' 1989 song 'Another Day in Paradise'] to its rightful owner" and revealed the release date as the upcoming Friday. The song was released on July 17, to mostly positive reviews from critics. Rolling Stone praised the song, describing it as "one for the croupiers", and remarking that "Flowers knows when to hold ’em and fold ’em as he spits out gambling puns." Stereogum panned the song, remarking that it "moves with less of an epic sweep [than preceding single 'Plans']" and "could almost pass for disco-country," while NME described the song as a "jaunty, country cut."

== Music video ==
Like its preceding single "Plans", a live recording of "Paradise" was released as a music video on July 17. The video, also directed by Jared L. Christopher, was recorded inside of RCA Studio A in Nashville, Tennessee, the same studio in which Thrasher was recorded. The video features Flowers and session musicians performing the song, while the video switches consistently between pro-shot footage and handheld format footage. A lyric video for "Paradise" was released on August 4.

== Personnel ==
Credits adapted from the liner notes of Thrasher.

=== Technical ===
- Brandon Flowers – vocals
- Bruce Bouton – pedal steel guitar
- Sam Bacco – percussion
- Jonathan Rado – bass, acoustic guitar, banjo
- Kiley Phillips – backing vocals
- Maureen Murphy – backing vocals
- Margo Price – backing vocals
- Todd Lombardo – acoustic guitar, mandolin
- Laur Joamets – guitar
- Bobby Ogdin – piano
- Steve Nathan – organ
- Jeremy Fetzer – guitar
- Charlie McCoy – harmonica
- Fred Eltringham – drums
- Maxwell Karmazyn – violin, violas
- Debra Fotheringham – backing vocals
- Marie Bradshaw – backing vocals
- Glenn Worf – bass

=== Technical and creative ===
- Shawn Everett – production, recording, mixing
- Jonathan Rado – production
- Jed Jones – recording, production
- Ian Gold – recording
- Connor Theriot – engineering assistance
- Philip Smith – engineering assistance
- Diana Walsh – engineering assistance
- Warren Fu – creative direction, artwork
- Chris Phelps – photography
- Britt McCamey – styling

== Charts ==
Chart (2026)	Peak position
UK Singles Downloads (Official Charts)	86
