= Jonathan Rado =

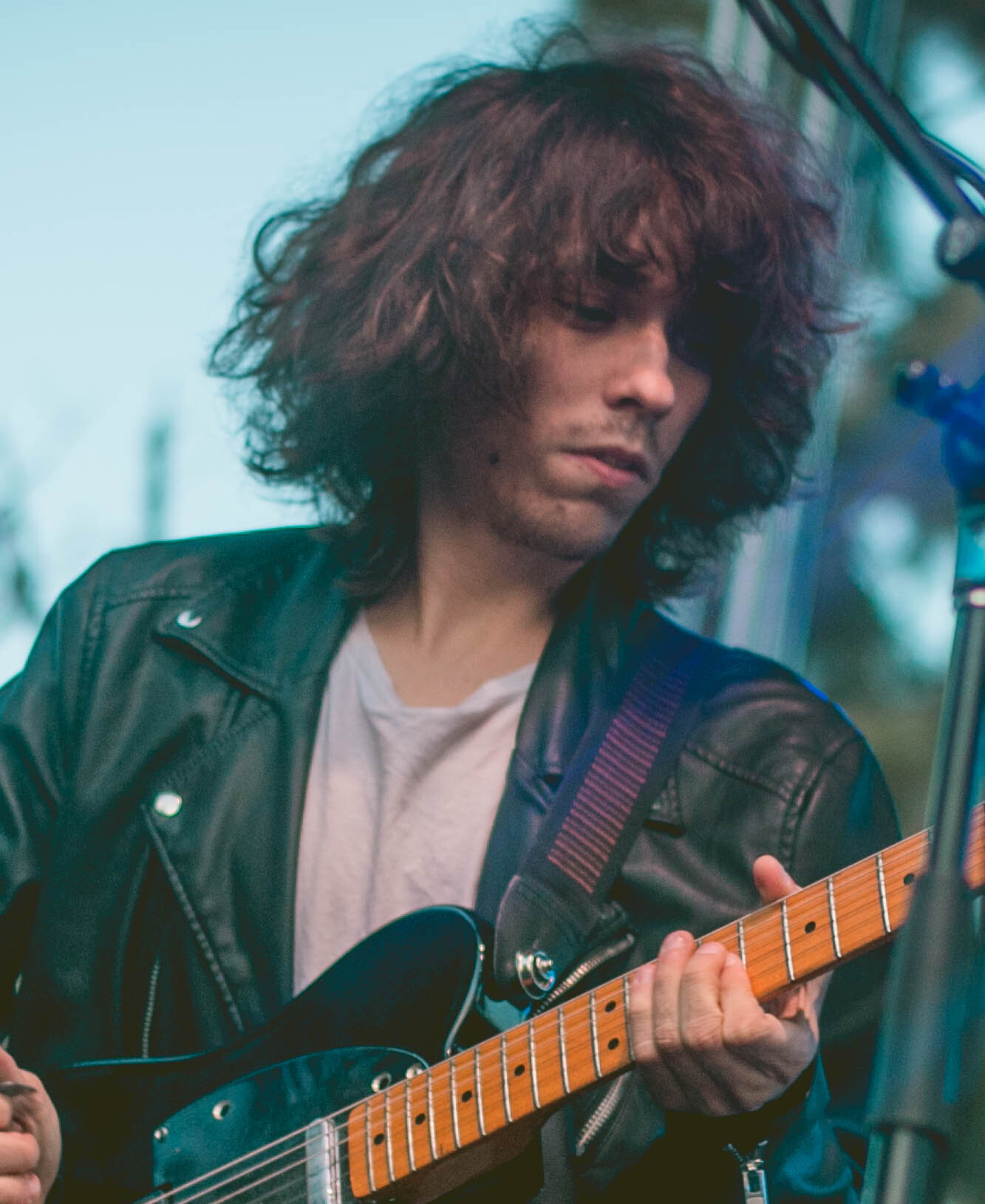
- Jonathan Rado performing with Foxygen in 2017

Background information
- Origin: Westlake Village, California, U.S.
- Genre: Indie rock
- Occupations: Musician; producer; engineer
- Instruments: Guitar; bass guitar; keyboards; synthesizers
- Years active: 2005–present
- Labels: Woodsist; Western Vinyl
- Member of: Foxygen

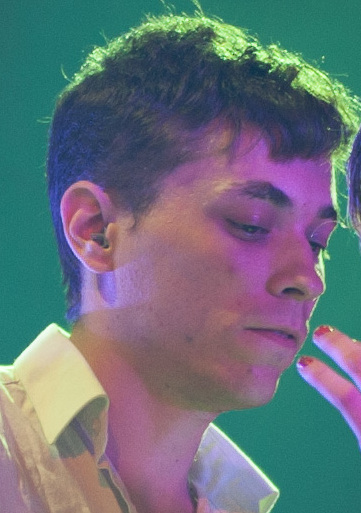
Rado in 2015

Jonathan Rado is an American musician, record producer and engineer, best known as a multi-instrumentalist in the indie rock duo Foxygen. Rado is a native of Westlake Village, California, where he formed Foxygen with his classmate Sam France in 2005.

After releasing four albums with Foxygen, Rado began producing albums for other artists, including the Killers, the Lemon Twigs, Tim Heidecker, Matt Maltese, Whitney, Alex Cameron, Father John Misty and Weyes Blood. In 2018, Billboard called Rado "one of indie rock's most in-demand producers". Rolling Stone called him an "analog fetishist who's become a producer of choice for a particular breed of like-minded indie-pop artists."

Rado is married to singer-songwriter Jackie Cohen. He also appeared in a 2008 episode of the television series Weeds and a 2009 episode of the sitcom Community. Rado is of Hungarian descent. He studied screenwriting at the School of Visual Arts in New York.

== Discography ==
Solo

- Law and Order (2013)
- Born to Run (2017)
- For Who the Bell Tolls For (2023)

with Foxygen

- Jurrassic Exxplosion Phillipic (2007)
- Take the Kids Off Broadway (2011)
- We Are the 21st Century Ambassadors of Peace & Magic (2013)
- ...And Star Power (2014)
- Hang (2017)
- Seeing Other People (2019)

== Credits ==
Year	Artist	Album	Credits
2013	Foxygen	We Are the 21st Century Ambassadors of Peace & Magic	Performer, Songwriter
2014	Foxygen	...And Star Power	Producer, Performer, Songwriter
2014	Dub Thompson	9 Songs	Producer
2015	Dante Elephante	Anglo-Saxon Summer	Producer
2016	Tim Heidecker	In Glendale	Additional Production
2016	Whitney	Light Upon the Lake	Producer
2016	The Lemon Twigs	Do Hollywood	Producer
2017	Foxygen	Hang	Producer, Performer, Songwriter
2017	Los Angeles Police Department	Los Angeles Police Department	Producer
2017	Beach Fossils	Somersault	Producer
2017	Trevor Sensor	Andy Warhol's Dream	Producer
2017	Alex Cameron	Forced Witness	Producer
2018	Cut Worms	Hollow Ground	Producer
2018	Father John Misty	God's Favorite Customer	Producer
2018	Matt Maltese	Bad Contestant	Producer
2018	Jackie Cohen	Tacoma Night Terror, Part 1: I've Got the Blues	Producer
2018	Houndmouth	Golden Age	Producer
2018	Jackie Cohen	Tacoma Night Terror, Part 2: Self-Fulfilling Elegy	Producer
2019	Weyes Blood	Titanic Rising	Producer
2019	Foxygen	Seeing Other People	Producer, Performer, Songwriter
2019	Houndmouth	"Talk of the Town" from California Voodoo Part II	Producer, Songwriter
2019	Jackie Cohen	Zagg	Producer, Songwriter
2019	Tim Heidecker	What the Brokenhearted Do...	Producer
2019	Cuco	"KeepingTabs" and "Far Away From Home" from Para Mi	Producer
2019	Whitney	Forever Turned Around	Producer
2019	Alex Cameron	Miami Memory	Producer
2019	Jungle Green	Runaway with Jungle Green	Producer
2019	Adam Green	Engine of Paradise	Producer
2020	Purr	Like New	Producer
2020	Alex Izenberg	"Caravan Château" from Caravan Château	Producer
2020	Matt Maltese	"Queen Bee", "Madhouse", "Leather Wearing AA" from Madhouse EP	Producer
2020	The Lemon Twigs	Songs for the General Public	Additional Production
2020	The Killers	Imploding the Mirage	Producer, Songwriter
2020	Tim Heidecker	Fear of Death	Additional Production
2021	Crumb	Ice Melt	Producer
2021	Silvertwin	Silvertwin	Producer
2021	The Killers	Pressure Machine	Producer, Performer, Songwriter
2021	Oberhofer	Smothered	Producer, Performer
2022	Diane Coffee	With People	Producer, Performer
2022	Jackie Cohen	Pratfall	Producer
2022	Weyes Blood	And in the Darkness, Hearts Aglow	Producer
2023	Whitney	"For a While"	Producer, Performer
2023	Purr	Who is Afraid of Blue?	Producer
2023	Whitney	"Kansas"	Producer
2024	Beyonce & Miley Cyrus	"II Most Wanted" from Cowboy Carter	Additional Production, Performer
2024	Crumb	Amama	Producer
2024	The Killers	"Bright Lights"	Producer
2025	Miley Cyrus	Something Beautiful	Producer, Songwriter, Performer
2026	Brandon Flowers	Thrasher	Performer, Producer
