= Tiger's Blood (song) =

Single by Brandon Flowers

from the album Thrasher
- Released: August 7, 2026
- Recorded: July 2025
- Studio: RCA Studio A (Nashville, Tennessee); June Audio (Provo, Utah)
- Genre: Alternative rock
- Length: 4:10
- Label: Island
- Songwriter: Brandon Flowers
- Producers: Jonathan Rado; Shawn Everett; Jed Jones

Brandon Flowers singles chronology
"Paradise" (2026)	"Tiger's Blood" (2026)

Music audio
- "Tiger's Blood (Official Audio)" on YouTube

"Tiger's Blood" is a song by American singer-songwriter Brandon Flowers, frontman of rock group the Killers, from his third solo studio album Thrasher (2026). The song was released as the third single from the album on August 7, 2026. "Tiger's Blood" was written by Flowers and features production work from Jed Jones, Jonathan Rado, and Shawn Everett.

== Background and composition ==
"Tiger's Blood" was recorded at RCA Studio A in Nashville, Tennessee and June Audio in Provo, Utah in July 2025, and features musicians such as pedal steel player Bruce Bouton, former TCB Band keyboardist Bobby Ogdin, and Bob Dylan harmonica player Charlie McCoy. The song departs from the country and Americana sound of the rest of the album, instead drawing alternative rock influence from Bruce Springsteen. Flowers described the song as one "that just feels very much like it’s part of Pressure Machine", the Killers' 2021 studio album, telling Rolling Stone Australia:

It’s about me moving to that little town and being an outlier. But then I’m making these friends, and I’m coming to that age again that we talked about where some of those kids that I jumped on the trampoline with are now buried in the cemetery in that town. So it’s sort of an exercise of just remembering them.

The song, described as "an anthemic reckoning with nostalgia, loss, and getting older", was written solely by Flowers, and has a runtime of 4 minutes and 10 seconds. "Tiger's Blood" features production work from Jed Jones, as well as Jonathan Rado and Shawn Everett, who previously both produced the Killers' Imploding the Mirage (2020) and Pressure Machine.

== Release and reception ==
Flowers debuted "Tiger's Blood" at the Newport Folk Festival on July 26, 2026, 12 days before the single's release on August 7. The song received positive reviews upon its release. Rolling Stone and NME both described the song as "Springsteen-esque", with NME noting that the song is an "anthem that packs a bigger punch than Flowers’ previous two offerings ['Plans' and 'Paradise']". Stereogum called the song "a propulsive rocker" that holds even more "Springsteen influence than so many past Flowers and Killers songs", comparing the song's vocals to Springsteen's "I'm on Fire". Pitchfork described the song as Flowers "[blasting] past everything—tired songwriting tropes, stock phrases ('Roll on like a runaway train'), at least one reference to an old Killers hit ('When We Were Young')", praising the song's chorus.

== Personnel ==
Credits adapted from the liner notes of Thrasher.

=== Musicians ===
- Brandon Flowers – vocals
- Bruce Bouton – pedal steel guitar
- Sam Bacco – percussion
- Jonathan Rado – bass, Jupiter-4
- Kiley Phillips – background vocals
- Maureen Murphy – background vocals
- Margo Price – background vocals
- Todd Lombardo – acoustic guitar
- Laur Joamets – guitar
- Bobby Ogdin – piano
- Taylor Goldsmith – guitar
- Maxwell Karmazyn – violin, viola
- Griffin Goldsmith – drums
- Dennis Karmazyn – cello
- David Rawlings – acoustic guitar
- Mariachi Los Camperos de Jesús Chuy Guzmán – mariachi ensemble

=== Technical and creative ===
- Shawn Everett – production, recording, mixing
- Jonathan Rado – production
- Jed Jones – recording, production
- Ian Gold – recording
- Connor Theriot – engineering assistance
- Philip Smith – engineering assistance
- Diana Walsh – engineering assistance
- Warren Fu – creative direction, artwork
- Chris Phelps – photography
- Britt McCamey – styling

== Charts ==
Chart (2026)	Peak position
UK Singles Downloads (Official Charts)	52
