= Thrasher (album) =

Studio album by Brandon Flowers
- Released: August 21, 2026
- Recorded: July 2025
- Studios: RCA Studio A (Nashville, Tennessee); June Audio (Provo, Utah) (Note: Tracks 3, 5, and 10)
- Genres: Country; Americana; country western
- Length: 42:46
- Label: Island
- Producers: Jonathan Rado; Shawn Everett; Jed Jones

Brandon Flowers chronology
The Desired Effect (2015)	Thrasher (2026)

Singles from Thrasher
- 1. "Plans" Released: June 26, 2026; 2. "Paradise" Released: July 17, 2026; 3. "Tiger's Blood" Released: August 7, 2026

Thrasher (stylized in all caps) is the third solo studio album by American singer-songwriter Brandon Flowers, lead singer of rock group the Killers, released on August 21, 2026 by Island Records. The album has features of country and Americana, marking a stylistic departure from Flowers' 2015 solo studio album The Desired Effect. Thrasher features musicians such as Charlie McCoy, David Rawlings, Bruce Bouton as well as production work from Jonathan Rado, Shawn Everett, and Jed Jones.

Thrasher is a concept album that serves as a follow up to the Killers' 2021 album Pressure Machine, which explores Flowers' childhood growing up in Nephi, Utah. Influenced by Johnny Cash and Waylon Jennings, the album was recorded at the historic RCA Studio A in Nashville, Tennessee, as well as June Audio in Provo, Utah, throughout July 2025.

Thrasher was preceded by three singles—"Plans", "Paradise", and "Tiger's Blood"—all of which received praise from critics. The album was critically acclaimed upon release, receiving praise for its storytelling and incorporation of Americana. In support of the album, Flowers toured North America and Europe. Commercially, it debuted on the UK Albums Chart at number three, on the Scottish Albums Chart at number two, and on the Billboard 200 at number 196.

== Background ==
Flowers revealed in 2023 that he was working on at least one solo record that embodied "a little bit of [his] first two solo records [Flamingo and The Desired Effect]," describing the album as "almost wrapped up". Flowers later told NME that he had two solo albums he was working on, revealing that "one is almost mixed [and] the other will follow shortly." Thrasher was recorded at RCA Studio A in Nashville, Tennessee with musicians such as Bob Dylan harmonica player Charlie McCoy, guitarist David Rawlings, and pedal steel player Bruce Bouton. Three songs, "Tiger's Blood", "Paradise", and "An American Dream", were recorded at June Audio in Provo, Utah. Produced by Jed Jones, as well as Jonathan Rado and Shawn Everett, who produced the Killers' Imploding the Mirage (2020) and Pressure Machine (2021), Flowers told NME that he "had a ball" making the album.

Flowers cited influences such as Johnny Cash and Waylon Jennings from his "father's music", and described the album as "country western music" with "a breezy enthusiasm." Flowers described how he would get "in the car with [his] dad [and] it would be Waylon Jennings and Willie Nelson" and as he's "gotten older, [he's] just gravitated a little bit more towards [his] father's music." Thrasher has also been compared to the "Americana and Western stylings" similar to that of the Killers' Sam’s Town (2006) and Pressure Machine. The album originated in 2021, with songs such as "An American Dream" being written shortly after the Killers' seventh studio album Pressure Machine was released, which serves as the precursor to Thrasher. Described as "a heartfelt and adventurous document of all the people Flowers has known and loved and feared", the album strikes "a balance between sadness and humour, and captures thinly veiled stories from" Flowers' childhood and is said to pick "up where 'Pressure Machine' left off".

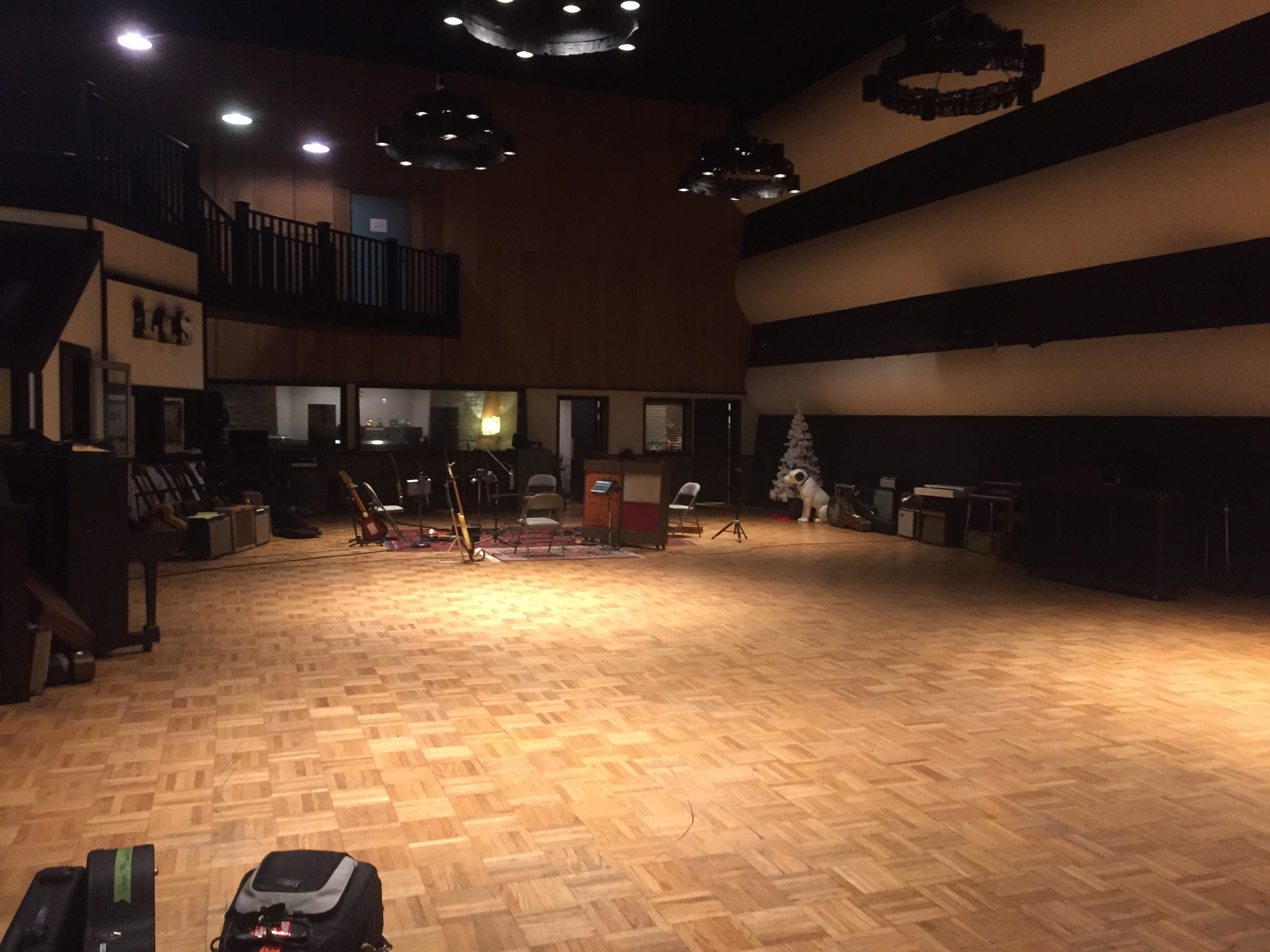
Thrasher was recorded at Nashville's historic RCA Studio A in July 2025

=== Recording ===
The recording process for the album took place throughout July 2025. Progress was initially slow at first, with Flowers recalling that "every day [the group would] start late because people would sit and tell stories", with Flowers himself feeling "humbled" by the other musicians. More than 30 tracks were written for Thrasher as well as Flowers' upcoming fourth studio album, which he described as "a romantic South West record". The group recorded each song "three or four times live" until "one of them ended up being the take". Lead single "Plans" was the last song recorded for the album, as it originally wasn't a country song, but was slowed down and mixed into one from Flowers' original recording of it on the Voice Memos app. Flowers', who "hadn’t recorded that way since [the Killers'] Hot Fuss (2004) and Sam's Town (2006), described the process as "one of the highlights of [his] recording career", praising the "experience and competence in the room".

== Music and lyrics ==
Musically, Thrasher has been described as comprising elements of country, country western and Americana.

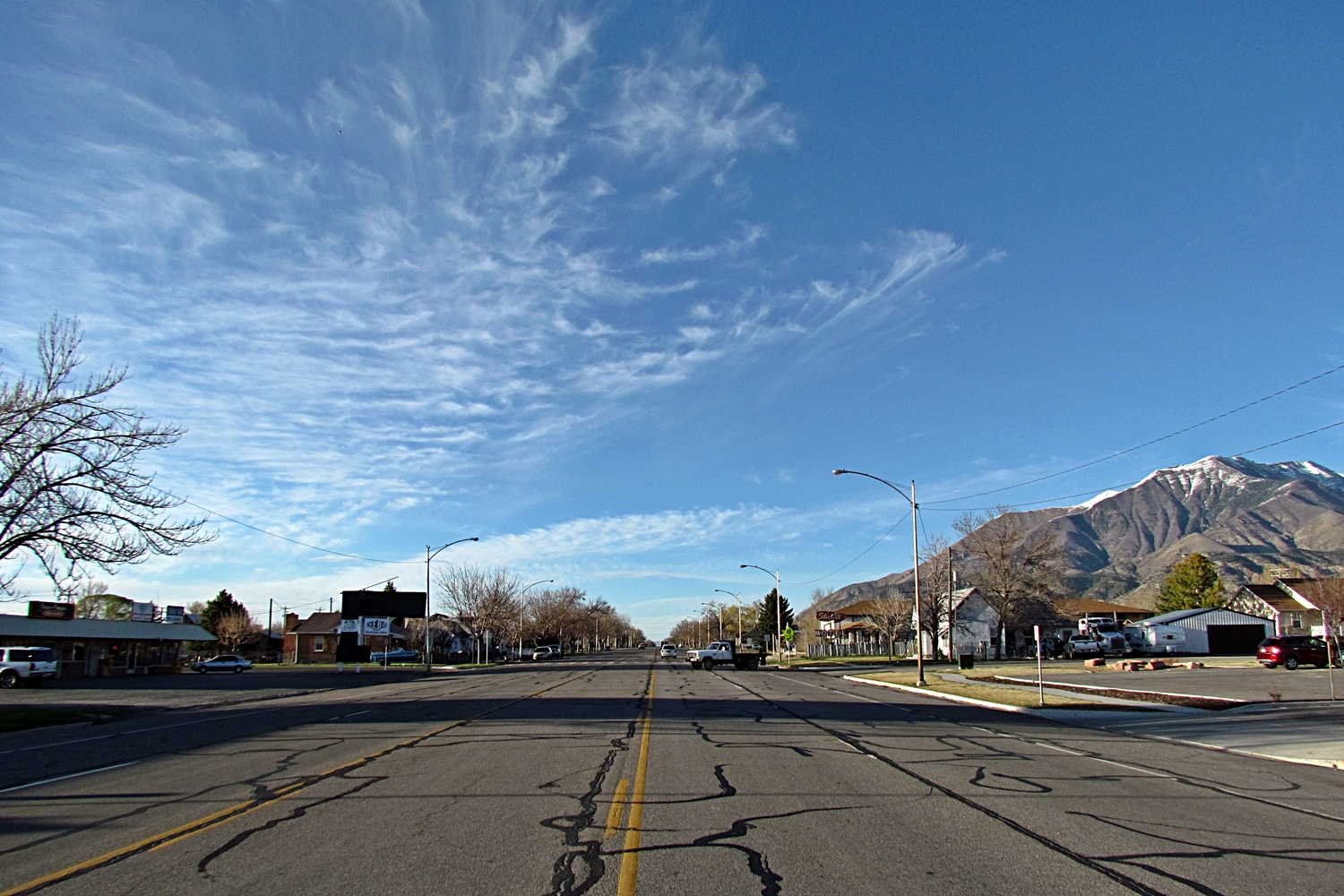
Nephi, Utah serves as Flowers' hometown and subject of the album.

Lyrically, Thrasher focuses on Flowers' childhood in Nephi, Utah, where he lived from the age of 8 until his junior year in high school, similar to that of the Killers' Pressure Machine. Certain songs detail Flowers' nostalgia of his youth, such as "Does It Ever Cross Your Mind?" which displays his appreciation of the "happenstance beauty" of being placed "next to the people with whom we spend the rest of our lives", and "Miss America", which chronicles Flowers' memories of "'80s shopping mall pageants and fraught early childhood memories." Other tracks display the guilt and sadness faced in Flowers' personal life, such as "One of Us", a lyrical tribute to Flowers' brother-in-law "who suddenly passed several years ago." Closing track "An American Dream" is described as a "phantasmagoric" track where Flowers' recalls his mom "watching his dad near the end of his life" (the both of which were previously the subject of the Killers' "A Dustland Fairytale" from Day & Age).

== Promotion and singles ==
Flowers unveiled the title of Thrasher on WXPN's World Cafe show at NON-COMMvention on May 7, 2026, alongside the announcement of "Plans" as an upcoming lead single. At the convention, Flowers hosted a listening session for songs such as "Plans", "Paradise", "Does It Ever Cross Your Mind?" and "Tiger's Blood", as well as a live performance of "Miss America" with Rado on acoustic guitar. Flowers officially announced Thrasher through social media trailers preceding and on June 23, with pre-orders starting the same day.

Lead single "Plans" was released on June 26 to mostly positive reviews, alongside a music video featuring Flowers and additional session musicians performing the song inside the "historic RCA Studio A." A lyric video for "Plans" was released on July 9. Announced on July 13, "Paradise" was released as the second single on July 17. A music video was released on the same day, and a lyric video on August 4. "Tiger's Blood" was released as the third single on August 7. A music video for "Does It Ever Cross Your Mind?" was released to coincide with the album's release on August 21.

Flowers announced a tour in support of Thrasher on June 24. The tour began on August 28 with a North American leg throughout September, followed by a stop at Austin City Limits Music Festival on October 2. Following this, Flowers embarked on a tour of the United Kingdom in late October before ending in Dublin on October 27. Pre-sale tickets went on sale on June 25, with general sale beginning on June 26. Flowers also performed at the Newport Folk Festival on July 26, and performed "An American Dream" on The Tonight Show Starring Jimmy Fallon on September 22, 2026.

== Release and artwork ==
Thrasher was released on August 21, 2026 by Island Records. An LP bundled with a signed poster was released in addition to standard formats such as CD, vinyl, and cassette. A limited edition hand-stamped hand-numbered white label LP was also released. The cover art for the album, depicting Flowers punching while wearing a "tassel heavy" western shirt, was shot by Chris Phelps, with creative direction for the cover by Flowers and Warren Fu.

== Critical reception ==
Professional ratings
Aggregate scores
Source	Rating
Any Decent Music	6.9/10
Metacritic	73/100
Review scores
Source	Rating
The Guardian	4/5 stars
NME	4/5 stars
Pitchfork	7.0/10
PopMatters	7/10
Rolling Stone	2.5/5 stars

On Any Decent Music, the album has a weighted average score of 6.9 out of 10 from twenty critic scores. According to Metacritic, it received "generally favorable" reviews based on a weighted average score of 73 out of 100 from seventeen critic scores.

Shaad D'Souza of The Guardian called it a "rip-snorting, honky-tonking, Nudie suit-wearing country" album, remarking that in comparison to "2015's The Desired Effect, Flowers' last solo record, Thrasher is front-to-back a far stronger, more enjoyable album." Andrew Trendell of NME complimented the album, describing it as "a whole lotta soul sold on pure and thorough conviction" and praising Flowers' storytelling, drawing comparison to the Killers' "underrated epic 'Imploding the Mirage'" (2020). Jayson Greene of Pitchfork rated the album a 7/10, comparing Flowers' voice to that of Waylon Jennings, and his songwriting to that of his "spiritual predecessor" Garth Brooks, saying "Flowers' voice glints like sunlight off a Ford truck’s chrome sideview mirror. It sounds so good, and so convincing." John Amen of Pop Matters gave the album a 7/10, writing, "Thrasher's characters suffer, sometimes acutely, particularly on the album's later tracks. That said, Brandon Flowers' melodies are largely airy, ebullient, even life-affirming. Articulating the troubles we face, he also, and perhaps ultimately, pays homage to our resilience". Jon Dolan of Rolling Stone panned the album, describing it as "drunk on sweeping Americana imagery and marveling at the sound of his voice booming across those sweet Nashville studios", calling the album not "quite strong enough to be this epically melodramatic".

== Track listing ==
All tracks written by Brandon Flowers. All tracks produced by Jonathan Rado and Shawn Everett, except where noted.

No.	Title	Producers	Length
1.	"Does It Ever Cross Your Mind?"		3:11
2.	"One of Us"		3:18
3.	"Tiger's Blood"	Rado, Everett, Jed Jones	4:10
4.	"Plans"		3:51
5.	"Paradise"	Rado, Everett, Jones	3:46
6.	"Miss America"		4:55
7.	"Angel"		5:02
8.	"The Red Ground"		4:06
9.	"In a Heartbeat"		4:40
10.	"An American Dream"		5:43
Total length:			42:46

== Personnel ==
Credits are adapted from the liner notes of Thrasher.

=== Musicians ===
- Brandon Flowers – vocals (all tracks); Juno (track 6)
- Bruce Bouton – pedal steel (all tracks); Dobro (track 2)
- Sam Bacco – percussion (all tracks); drums (track 6); tubular bells (track 8)
- Jonathan Rado – bass (tracks 1–9); acoustic guitar (tracks 1, 5); mandolin (track 1); Jupiter-4 (track 3); banjo (track 5); bowed guitar (track 6); guitar (track 7); baritone guitar (track 8); pump organ (track 10)
- Maureen Murphy – backing vocals (tracks 1–6, 8–10)
- Kiley Phillips – backing vocals (tracks 1–6, 8–10)
- Margo Price – backing vocals (tracks 1–6, 8–10)
- Todd Lombardo – acoustic guitar (tracks 1–4, 6–10); mandolin (tracks 1, 2, 5)
- Laur Joamets – guitar (tracks 1–3, 5–10); baritone guitar (track 4)
- Bobby Ogdin – piano (tracks 1–3, 5–10); keyboards (track 4)
- Steve Nathan – organ (tracks 1, 2, 4–7, 9, 10); Wurlitzer (track 4)
- Jeremy Fetzer – guitar (tracks 1, 2, 4–6, 8, 9); baritone guitar (track 4)
- Charlie McCoy – harmonica (tracks 1, 2, 4, 5, 7, 9, 10); bass harp (track 8)
- Fred Eltringham – drums (tracks 1, 2, 5)
- Taylor Goldsmith – guitar (tracks 1, 3, 7, 10); bass, baritone guitar (track 8); backing vocals (track 9)
- Maxwell Karmazyn – violins, violas (tracks 3–5, 7, 8)
- Griffin Goldsmith – drums (tracks 3, 4, 7–9); bowed guitar (track 6); backing vocals (track 9)
- Dennis Karmazyn – cello (tracks 3, 4, 8)
- Dave Rawlings – acoustic guitar (tracks 3, 6, 8)
- Mariachi los Camperos de Jesús Chuy Guzmán – mariachi ensemble (tracks 3, 7, 8)
- Debra Fotheringham – backing vocals (track 5)
- Marie Bradshaw – backing vocals (track 5)
- Glenn Worf – bass (track 5)
- Jake Blanton – gang vocals, bass (track 10)
- Jed Jones – gang vocals (track 10)
- Ronnie Vannucci Jr. – drums (track 10)

=== Technical and creative ===
- Shawn Everett – production, recording, mixing
- Jonathan Rado – production
- Jed Jones – recording (all tracks); production (tracks 3, 5)
- Ian Gold – recording
- Scott Wiley – recording (track 10)
- Connor Theriot – engineering assistance
- Philip Smith – engineering assistance
- Diana Walsh – engineering assistance
- Ruairi O'Flaherty – mastering (track 4)
- Warren Fu – creative direction, artwork
- Chris Phelps – photography
- Britt McCamey – styling

== Charts ==
Chart performance for Thrasher
Chart (2026)	Peak position
Australian Albums (ARIA)	44
Australian Country Albums (ARIA)	7
Belgian Albums (Ultratop Flanders)	114
Belgian Albums (Ultratop Wallonia)	85
French Physical Albums (SNEP)	130
French Rock & Metal Albums (SNEP)	42
Irish Albums (Official Charts)	33
Scottish Albums (Official Charts)	2
Swiss Albums (Schweizer Hitparade)	54
UK Albums (Official Charts)	3
UK Americana Albums (Official Charts)	1
UK Country Albums (Official Charts)	1
US Billboard 200	196
US Americana/Folk Albums (Billboard)	16
US Top Country Albums (Billboard)	38
