= Light Upon the Lake =

Studio album by Whitney
- Released: June 3, 2016
- Recorded: 2015
- Studio: Jonathan Rado's house in Los Angeles
- Genres: Americana; country soul; indie pop
- Length: 29:58
- Label: Secretly Canadian
- Producers: Whitney; Jonathan Rado

Whitney chronology
Light Upon the Lake (2016)	Forever Turned Around (2019)

Singles from Light Upon the Lake
- 1. "No Woman" Released: January 18, 2016; 2. "Golden Days" Released: March 23, 2016; 3. "No Matter Where We Go" Released: May 24, 2016

Light Upon the Lake is the debut studio album by American rock band Whitney, released on June 3, 2016, on Secretly Canadian.

== Background and recording ==
The album is Max Kakacek and Julien Ehrlich's first release since the breakup of their previous band, Smith Westerns, for which Kakacek was the guitarist and Ehrlich was the drummer. Ehrlich was also formerly the drummer of the band Unknown Mortal Orchestra.

Light Upon the Lake was written during the winter in the band's hometown of Chicago, Illinois and was recorded in the San Fernando Valley in California with Foxygen member Jonathan Rado, who also produced the album along with the band. The band joined Rado at his home in Los Angeles and slept in tents in his backyard.

== Release ==
The album was preceded by the singles "No Woman," "Golden Days," and "No Matter Where We Go". Each single was released alongside a music video. "No Woman" was later featured in the 2018/19 video game Life Is Strange 2.

== Critical reception ==
Professional ratings
Aggregate scores
Source	Rating
AnyDecentMusic?	7.8/10
Metacritic	83/100
Review scores
Source	Rating
AllMusic	4/5 stars
Clash	9/10
Consequence of Sound	B+
DIY	4/5 stars
The Guardian	4/5 stars
The Irish Times	4/5 stars
NME	4/5
Pitchfork	8.3/10
Q	4/5 stars
Uncut	8/10

Light Upon the Lake received wide acclaim from contemporary music critics. At Metacritic, which assigns a normalized rating out of 100 to reviews from mainstream critics, the album received an average score of 83, based on 18 reviews, which indicates "universal acclaim".

Nikki Volpicelli of Paste praised the album, stating, "Sure, literally speaking all of the songs off of Light Upon the Lake conjure up failure to maintain a relationship with a loved one, but how can you relate a new band’s debut record—and one that’s so so fully realized to the point of even having a mission statement in the Whitney, as a man, as a writing prompt and concept—with a break up? If anything, it’s the start of something new." Matthew Schnipper of Pitchfork gave the album a favorable review, stating, "Whitney might not reinvent anything, but they sound perfect right now, and it’s hard to argue with being in the right place at the right time."

Michael Hann of The Guardian gave the album a favorable review, stating, "Those with a low tolerance for winsome male falsettos may wish to steer clear, but anyone who loves the strain of American pop that began when the Byrds started branching out in 1966 and 1967 should rush to hear this delightful confection." Matt Wilkinson of NME praised the album, stating, "Bass, horns, strings, organ and choir provide the backbone, and when Whitney allow themselves to kick it up a gear and really let rip, as on ‘Golden Days’ (with its cathartic “Na na na” outro) or the George Harrison-meets-The Band magnificence of ‘Dave’s Song’, they're untouchable."

=== Accolades ===
Accolades for Light Upon the Lake
Publication	Accolade	Year	Rank	Ref.
Consequence of Sound	Top 50 Albums of 2016	2016	38	
The Guardian	The Best Albums of 2016	2016	33	
NME	NME's Albums of the Year 2016	2016	42	
Paste	The 50 Best Albums of 2016	2016	37	
Pitchfork	The 20 Best Rock Albums of 2016	2016	—N/a	
Rough Trade	Albums of the Year	2016	58	
The Skinny	Top 50 Albums of 2016	2016	38	

== Track listing ==
All tracks are written by Julien Ehrlich and Max Kakacek.

Light Upon the Lake track listing
No.	Title	Length
1.	"No Woman"	3:57
2.	"The Falls"	2:20
3.	"Golden Days"	4:02
4.	"Dave's Song"	3:01
5.	"Light Upon the Lake"	3:09
6.	"No Matter Where We Go"	2:41
7.	"On My Own"	2:14
8.	"Red Moon"	1:42
9.	"Polly"	3:26
10.	"Follow"	3:26
Total length:		29:58

== Personnel ==
Credits adapted from the liner notes of Light Upon the Lake.

- Julien Ehrlich – performer
- Max Kakacek – performer
- Charles Glanders – performer
- Josiah Marshall – performer
- Malcolm Brown – performer
- Tracy Chouteau – performer
- Will Miller – performer
- Jonathan Rado – additional performer
- Macie Stewart – additional performer
- Myra Hinrichs – additional performer
- Ziyad Asrar – additional performer

Production

- Whitney – production, mixing (track 1)
- Jonathan Rado – production
- Daniel J. Goodwin – mixing (tracks 4, 6, 9)
- Jacob Portrait – mixing (tracks 1–3, 5, 7, 8, 10)
- Miles Johnson – art direction, design
- Sandy Kim – photography
