= Ice Melt =

2021 studio album by Crumb

Studio album by Crumb
- Released: April 30, 2021
- Length: 29:32
- Label: Crumb
- Producer: Jonathan Rado

Crumb chronology
Jinx (2019)	Ice Melt (2021)	AMAMA (2024)

Ice Melt is a studio album by Crumb, released on April 30, 2021.

== Production ==
The album was written over the course of two years, and was first demoed by Crumb frontwoman Lila Ramani in 2019. It was recorded at a Los Angeles studio and produced by Jonathan Rado of Foxygen. It was produced and released independently on the band's own label, Crumb Records.

== Composition ==
The album features fluidity and water imagery. During recording, the band lowered a microphone protected by a condom into a bucket of water, so that they could produce an underwater sound effect.

== Release ==
The album was released on April 30, 2021. Three songs from the album were released as singles, including "Trophy", "BNR", and "Balloon".

== Reception ==
Professional ratings
Aggregate scores
Source	Rating
Metacritic	76/100
Review scores
Source	Rating
Beats Per Minute	80/100
Clash	7/10
DIY	2.5/5 stars
Pitchfork	7.5/10

The album has a score of 76 on Metacritic, indicating "generally favorable" reviews. It received praise for layered instrumentals and strong vocals, with some critics also writing favorably about its atmospheric songwriting.

Nick Roseblade of Clash called it a "a delightful album filled with clever melodies and delicious vocals".

Alex Cabre of DIY gave the album a more negative review, saying it "struggles to reach the same bright heights as its predecessor." He criticized the album as lacking direction or momentum.

== Track listing ==
All tracks are written by Crumb.

Ice Melt track listing
No.	Title	Length
1.	"Up & Down"	3:23
2.	"BNR"	3:01
3.	"Seeds"	3:21
4.	"L.A."	2:17
5.	"Gone"	3:32
6.	"Retreat!"	1:30
7.	"Trophy"	3:12
8.	"Balloon"	3:05
9.	"Tunnel (All That You Had)"	3:37
10.	"Ice Melt"	2:28
Total length:		29:32

== Personnel ==
- Lila Ramani – guitar, vocals
- Jesse Brotter – bass, vocals
- Bri Aronow – synthesizers, keyboard, saxophone
- Jonathan Gilad – drums
- Maeve Feinberg - strings
- Jonathan Rado – production
- Joe LaPorta – mastering engineer
- Michael Harris – mixing, engineering
