= No Destruction =

Single by Foxygen

from the album We Are the 21st Century Ambassadors of Peace & Magic
- B-side: "Where's the Money?"
- Released: 28 May 2013
- Recorded: 2012
- Genre: Psychedelic folk; psychedelic pop
- Length: 4:55
- Label: Jagjaguwar
- Songwriters: Sam France; Jonathan Rado

Foxygen singles chronology
"San Francisco" (2012)	"No Destruction" (2013)	"We Are the 21st Century Ambassadors of Peace & Magic" (2013)

"No Destruction" is a song by American indie rock band Foxygen. It is the third single from their third studio album We Are the 21st Century Ambassadors of Peace & Magic (2013). The song was released as a digital download on 28 May 2013.

== Music video ==
The music video for "No Destruction" was first released onto YouTube on 10 May 2013 at a total length of 4 minutes and 55 seconds. The music video was directed by Bryan Felber. The music video contains content used from various homemade videos from 2005-2009 as well as new content.

== Track listing ==
No.	Title	Length
1.	"No Destruction"	4:55
2.	"Where's the Money?"	4:38
Total length:		9:33

== Reception ==
"No Destruction" received very positive reviews from contemporary music critics. The song was chosen upon release as Pitchfork Media's "Best New Track". Mike Powell stated that, "Foxygen's 'No Destruction' is essentially a collage of quotes: Bob Dylan's straight-on delivery of crooked, impressionistic lyrics, the warm weariness of the Velvet Underground's self-titled third album, and the lazy anthems of Pavement. In short: big-budget feeling, played with shoestring ambition. What makes it sound fresh isn't that it faithfully imitates the past, but that it somehow fails to—a product of alluringly broken logic." Powell continues by saying, "Listeners coast-to-coast will no doubt notice the jab 'There's no need to be an asshole/ You're not in Brooklyn anymore', but the lyrical heart of the song comes later: 'You think it's over, oh you think it's over / To be someone who smokes pot in the subway with me', a semi-desperate diss from an old friend who can't see how things really are in part because they can't let go of how they were. Awkward nostalgia is a good subject for a band whose music sounds like it traveled decades to get here and got roughed up every step of the way."

== Release history ==
Date	Format	Label
28 May 2013	Digital download	Jagjaguwar
