= Para Mi (Cuco album) =

Studio album by Cuco
- Released: July 26, 2019
- Studios: Sonora Recorders, Los Angeles; 5ta Estudio, Bogotá, Colombia
- Genres: Indie pop; rock
- Length: 37:39
- Languages: English; Spanish
- Label: Interscope
- Producers: Cuco; Jonathan Rado

Cuco chronology
Chiquito (2018)	Para Mi (2019)	Fantasy Gateway (2022)

Singles from Para Mi
- 1. "Hydrocodrone" Released: April 2, 2019; 2. "Bossa No Sé" Released: May 22, 2019

Para Mi (transl. "For Me") is the debut studio album by American singer-songwriter Cuco. It was released on July 26, 2019, through Interscope Records. The album was co-produced by Cuco and Jonathan Rado of Foxygen. The album touches on recent problems that Cuco has experienced first-hand, including a tour bus accident that sent him and his band to hospital.

== Background ==
After the release of his fourth extended play, Chiquito, Cuco released several songs and collaborations. In 2018, he collaborated with Clairo on a non-album single called "Drown" as well as with Polyphia on a track called "So Strange" off their album New Levels New Devils. In 2019, he collaborated with his childhood Chicano rap idols MC Magic and Lil Rob on a track called "Search". Cuco signed with Interscope Records in March 2019 after a bidding war that lasted two years. On April 2, 2019, Cuco released the lead single for his album, "Hydrocodone" as well as "Bossa No Sé" featuring Jean Carter on May 22, 2019.

== Critical reception ==
Professional ratings
Aggregate scores
Source	Rating
Metacritic	68/100
Review scores
Source	Rating
AllMusic	3/5 stars
Crack Magazine	6/10
Highsnobiety	3.5/5 stars
Newsday	3/4 stars
NME	4/5 stars
Paste	6.4/10
Pitchfork	6.8/10
Rolling Stone	3.5/5 stars
The 405	6.5/10

Para Mi received generally positive reviews from music critics. At Metacritic, which assigns a normalized rating out of 100 to reviews from mainstream publications, the album received an average score of 68, based on 10 reviews. Mark Richardson of Wall Street Journal deemed the album "charmingly loose and endearingly quirky," while Suzy Exposito of Rolling Stone wrote that Cuco "transmutes various pop methodologies to create his own blend of burnout soul." Hua Hsu from The New Yorker expressed that "Banos's identity comes out, subtly, through language and his affection for tender, tear-jerking soul ballads." Safiya Hopfe from Exclaim! described the album as "rhythmically punchy and melodically smooth" and insisted that Cuco "juggles catchiness and variability without dropping the ball."

== Track listing ==
No.	Title	Writer(s)	Producer(s)	Length
1.	"Intro" (featuring Foos Gone Wild)	Steven Martinez	Cuco	0:29
2.	"Keeping Tabs" (featuring Suscat0)	Cuco; David Rodriguez	Cuco; Jonathan Rado	4:08
3.	"Bossa No Sé" (featuring Jean Carter)	Cuco; Chazz Eugene Carter	Cuco	3:21
4.	"Perihelion" (interlude)	Cuco	Cuco	2:32
5.	"Feelings"	Cuco	Cuco	3:10
6.	"Lovetripper"	Cuco	Cuco	5:10
7.	"Ego Death in Thailand"	Cuco	Cuco	3:14
8.	"Hydrocodone"	Cuco	Cuco	2:32
9.	"Far Away from Home"	Cuco	Cuco; Jonathan Rado	4:26
10.	"Brokey the Pear" (interlude)	Cuco	Cuco	1:25
11.	"Best Friend"	Cuco	Cuco	2:30
12.	"Room Tone" (interlude)	Cuco	Cuco	1:11
13.	"Do Better"	Cuco	Cuco	3:31
Total length:				37:39

== Personnel ==
Credits adapted from the AllMusic webpage on Para Mi.

=== Performers ===
- Cuco – production, vocals, arrangement
- Gabe Baltazar – guitar
- Fernando Carabajal – guitar
- Jean Carter – vocals, arrangement
- Julian Farias – drums
- Esai Salas – bass
- Suscat0 – vocals
- Mauri Tapia – drums

=== Production and recording ===
- Cuco – mixing, producer
- Jonathan Rado – engineer, producer
- Lars Stalfors – mastering, mixing
- Nicholas Ladron De Guevara – engineer
- Anthony Dolhai – mixing
- Steven Martinez – arrangement
- Tristan Friedberg Rodman – assistant engineer
- David Rodriguez – arrangement

== Charts ==
Chart (2019)	Peak position
US Billboard 200	94
US Top Alternative Albums	6
