= Locket (disambiguation) =

A locket is a type of jewelry pendant.

Locket may also refer to:

- Locket (film), a 1986 Indian Hindi-language film
- Locket (My Little Pony), a mainline pony in the My Little Pony franchise
- Locket Chatterjee (born 1974), Indian Bengali actress and politician
- Locket (EP), an extended play by American psychedelic rock band Crumb
- Locket (album), a 2026 studio album by American singer Madison Beer

== See also ==
- Lockets, a brand of throat lozenge
- Lockett, a surname
- The Locket (disambiguation)
