= Ryan Pollie =

American musician (born 1988)

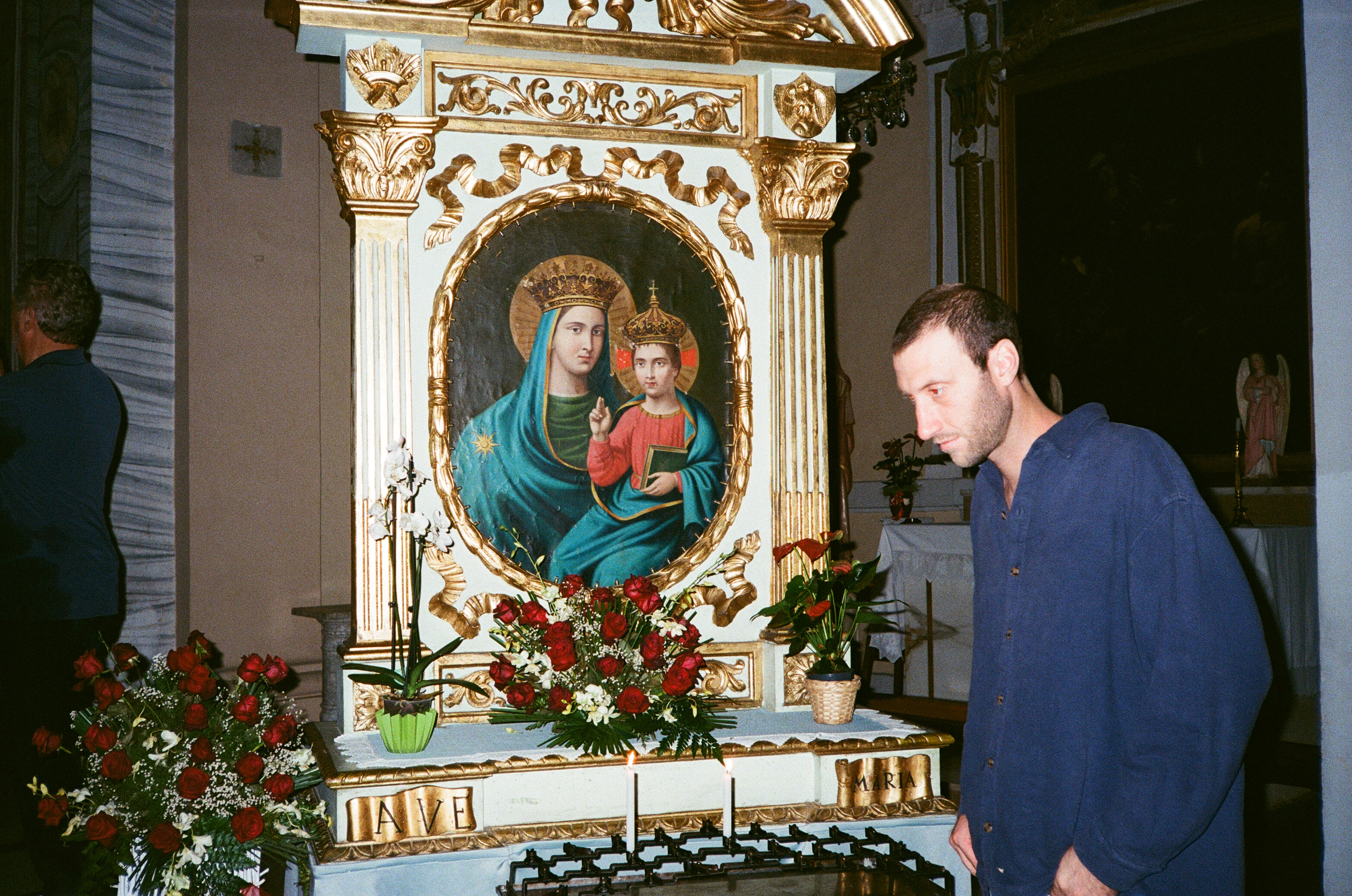
- Pollie in 2018

Background information
- Born: Ryan William Pollie; August 2, 1988 (age 38)
- Origin: Los Angeles, California, U.S.
- Genres: Indie rock; Singer-songwriter; Folk rock
- Years active: 2010–present
- Labels: Anti-; Fat Possum Records; Forged Artifacts; Chill Mega Chill

Ryan William Pollie (born August 2, 1988) is an American musician from Philadelphia, Pennsylvania who now lives in Los Angeles, California. Pollie is primarily known for music under his own name and as Los Angeles Police Department. He is also a music producer who mostly self produces his own albums.

== Career ==
Pollie moved to Los Angeles after completing a degree in music from Bates College in Maine in 2010. In 2014, Pollie began the recording project Los Angeles Police Department. The long, anonymous band name was inspired by 60s artists like Jimi Hendrix Experience, Creedence Clearwater Revival and The Mothers of Invention.

Pollie's self-titled debut album was released in 2014, and was called one of the best debuts of 2014 by Flood Magazine. The same year he was named a "Band To Watch" by Stereogum. Pitchfork, citing his "intense Smile studying" and ambitious arrangements and melodies, gave the record a 7.5 score.

In 2017, Pollie linked with Foxygen’s Jonathan Rado for production assistance and released his 2nd self titled record as Los Angeles Police Department. The album deals with his struggles with depression and anxiety, and the album cover alludes to his fear of flying. The first single "Hard" premiered on the Fader and the LA Times called the album "a memorable record from start to finish", citing "After the Gold Rush-era Neil Young" and "Brian Wilson" as influences.

While working on his first album under his own name, Pollie was diagnosed with cancer in 2018. He finished the record while receiving chemotherapy. Pollie's first single "Aim Slow" was premiered on NPR and the album was named one of New Commute's Albums of the Year, as well as one of Uproxx’s Best Indie Albums of 2019. The album was described by Pitchfork as a "folky blend of California pop and country" [10]. NPR favorably compared the music to ‘70s songwriters like Jackson Browne and Graham Nash.

In March 2020, Pollie released a concert film and accompanying EP titled "Live at the Grove." Around the same time, Pollie organized and created the first ever Highland Park Folk Festival which was staged outside at La Tierra de la Culebra Park. It featured music, comedy, and an outdoor festival flea market and was free to the public.

Pollie's next album will be titled Stars, the first album of his not self-titled.
