= Plans (Brandon Flowers song) =

Single by Brandon Flowers

from the album Thrasher
- Released: June 26, 2026
- Recorded: July 2025
- Studio: RCA Studio A (Nashville, Tennessee)
- Genre: Country; Americana
- Length: 3:51
- Label: Island
- Songwriter: Brandon Flowers
- Producers: Jonathan Rado; Shawn Everett

Brandon Flowers singles chronology
"I Can Change" (2015)	"Plans" (2026)	"Paradise" (2026)

Music videos
- "Plans (Live From Historic RCA Studio A)" on YouTube; "Plans (Official Lyric Video)" on YouTube

"Plans" is a song by American singer-songwriter Brandon Flowers, frontman of rock group the Killers, released as the lead single from his third solo studio album Thrasher (2026). The song, written by Flowers and produced by Jonathan Rado and Shawn Everett, was released on June 26, 2026.

== Background and composition ==
"Plans" was recorded at RCA Studio A in Nashville, Tennessee in July 2025, and features musicians such as pedal steel player Bruce Bouton, former TCB Band keyboardist Bobby Ogdin, and Bob Dylan harmonica player Charlie McCoy. "Plans" was written about Flowers' fallout and reflection of his unrealized and "ill-fated dreams" in his adult life and his return to his hometown of Nephi, Utah preceding the Killers' Pressure Machine (2021). Flowers recalled that when he "realised he could write about things that were more personal to" him, "there’s this whole other treasure trove to unlock and dive into," adding that it took a while for Flowers to "recognize that [his] story was never just [his] own" and that "turning them into songs just helps [him] make sense of it," which is the focus of "Plans" as well as Thrasher.

The song was written solely by Flowers and produced by Rado and Everett, who previously both produced the Killers' Imploding the Mirage (2020) and Pressure Machine. With a runtime of 3 minutes and 51 seconds, "Plans" has been cited as containing elements of country and americana. The song employs the use of acoustic guitar, pedal steel and "some rich female backing vocals, making way for lush strings" according to NME. In the song, Flowers describes himself and other residents of Nephi grappling with the burden of small town dead-end life, with Flowers recalling others "Whispering sweet nothings about / Gearing up and chasing down / A plan I drew up years ago."

== Release and reception ==
During an appearance on WXPN's World Cafe show at NON-COMMvention 2026 in Philadelphia where the title of Thrasher was unveiled, Flowers announced his plans to release "Plans" as Thrasher's lead single, due for a June release.

"Plans" was released as the lead single from Thrasher on June 26, 2026, to mostly positive reviews. NME described it as a "twangy, wistful song" that "sees the singer lean heavily into an Americana, old school country-tinged sound", noting the similarities to the Killers' "slow-burning, contemplative" Pressure Machine, with Stereogum praising Flowers' voice on the song, remarking that it "translates extremely well to this genre" and is used "to reflect on the timeless subject of how time's crucible alters our best-laid plans", while also remarking that the song "sounded like a Killers song with more pedal steel". BrooklynVegan complimented the song, calling it "a twangy, vintage-sounding, fiddle-and-pedal-steel-fueled ballad that you could picture soundtracking a honky tonk slow dance", while Rockshot Magazine described the song as having "understated instrumentation and evocative lyricism", but marking "a noticeable departure from the stadium-ready sound synonymous with The Killers while showcasing Flowers' ever-present gift for melody." DIY called the song "an evocative, widescreen number that’s immediately nostalgic and effortlessly affecting" and encouraged readers to listen to the song.

== Music videos ==
A live recording of the song was released as a music video on June 26. The video, directed by Emmy-nominated filmmaker Jared L. Christopher, depicts Flowers and additional musicians performing "Plans" inside RCA Studio A, the same studio where Thrasher was recorded. A lyric video was later released on July 9.

== Personnel ==
Credits adapted from the liner notes of Thrasher.

=== Musicians ===
- Brandon Flowers – vocals
- Bruce Bouton – pedal steel guitar
- Sam Bacco – percussion
- Jonathan Rado – bass
- Maureen Murphy – backing vocals
- Kiley Phillips – backing vocals
- Margo Price – backing vocals
- Todd Lombardo – acoustic guitar
- Laur Joamets – baritone guitar
- Bobby Ogdin – keyboards
- Steve Nathan – organ, electric piano
- Jeremy Fetzer – guitar, baritone guitar
- Charlie McCoy – harmonica
- Maxwell Karmazyn – violins, violas
- Griffin Goldsmith – drums
- Dennis Karmazyn – cello

=== Technical and creative ===
- Shawn Everett – production, recording, mixing
- Jonathan Rado – production
- Jed Jones – recording
- Ian Gold – recording
- Connor Theriot – engineering assistance
- Philip Smith – engineering assistance
- Diana Walsh – engineering assistance
- Ruairi O'Flaherty – mastering
- Warren Fu – creative direction, artwork
- Chris Phelps – photography
- Britt McCamey – styling

== Charts ==
Chart (2026)	Peak position
US Adult Alternative Airplay (Billboard)	13
UK Singles Downloads (Official Charts)	31
