= Amama (album) =

2024 studio album by Crumb

AMAMA

Studio album by Crumb
- Released: May 17, 2024
- Genre: Psychedelic pop; alternative rock
- Length: 35:14
- Label: Crumb
- Producer: Crumb; Jonathan Rado; Johnscott Sanford

Crumb chronology
Ice Melt (2021)	AMAMA (2024)

AMAMA is the third studio album by American band Crumb, released on May 17, 2024.

== Production and release ==
The album was announced in March 2024. The album was produced by Johnscott Sanford and Jonathan Rado.

Lila Ramani, Crumb's frontwoman, said the album is dedicated to her grandmother. Some of the songs featured on AMAMA were written during the production of the band's previous album, Ice Melt, and others predate the band's first album, Jinx.

== Critical reception ==
Professional ratings
Aggregate scores
Source	Rating
Metacritic	78/100
Review scores
Source	Rating
Pitchfork	8.1/10

AMAMA received a score of 78 out of 100 on review aggregator Metacritic based on five critics' reviews, which the website categorized as "generally favorable" reception.

Samuel Hyland, writing for Pitchfork, praised AMAMA and contrasted it positively with the band's first two albums, referring to it as a "a sleeker, riskier, and more rewarding iteration of Crumb's approach", and gave it a 8.1 rating out of 10.

== Track listing ==
All lyrics are written by Lila Ramani; all music is composed by Bri Aronow, Jesse Brotter, Jonathan Gilad, and Lila Ramani.

AMAMA track listing
No.	Title	Length
1.	"From Outside a Window Sill"	2:37
2.	"Side by Side"	3:07
3.	"The Bug"	3:56
4.	"AMAMA"	3:10
5.	"Genie"	5:48
6.	"Crushxd"	3:06
7.	"Nightly News"	0:49
8.	"(Alone in) Brussels"	3:18
9.	"Sleep Talk"	2:51
10.	"Dust Bunny"	3:04
11.	"Swarmed"	1:06
12.	"XXX"	2:22
Total length:		35:14

== Personnel ==
Crumb

- Bri Aronow – production, mixing (all tracks); piano (tracks 1, 6, 9), alto saxophone (1, 10), whistle (1), synthesizer (2–11), Rhodes (2, 3, 6, 9), Mellotron (2, 5, 6, 8, 10, 11), harpsichord (3), organ (9)
- Jesse Brotter – bass, production, mixing (all tracks); additional feedback (track 10)
- Jonathan Gilad – production, mixing (all tracks); drums (tracks 1–6, 8–11), shaker (1), drum programming (2, 6, 7, 9, 10, 11), tambourine (3), electronic drums (8, 9), MPC (12)
- Lila Ramani – production, mixing, additional recording (all tracks); vocals (tracks 1–6, 8–12), synthesizer (1, 4, 5, 10, 11); acoustic guitar, Mellotron (1); keyboards (2, 4, 5), guitar (3, 5–12), drum programming (4, 5), electric sitar (4), piano (6)

Additional contributors

- Jonathan Rado – production (all tracks), theremin (track 9)
- Johnscott Sanford – production, mixing, engineering
- Joe LaPorta – mastering
- James Riotto – engineering assistance
- Josh Schuback – engineering assistance
- Nathan Cimino – engineering assistance
- Robert Shelton – engineering assistance
