= Take the Kids Off Broadway =

Studio album by Foxygen
- Released: May 2011 (original release); July 24, 2012 (Jagjaguwar reissue)
- Recorded: 2011
- Genre: Experimental rock; psychedelic rock
- Length: 36:26
- Label: Jagjaguwar; Breakfast Horse
- Producer: Foxygen; Richard Swift

Foxygen chronology
Jurrassic Exxplosion Phillipic (2007)	Take the Kids Off Broadway (2011)	We Are the 21st Century Ambassadors of Peace & Magic (2013)

Original release cover

Professional ratings
Aggregate scores
Source	Rating
Metacritic	80/100
Review scores
Source	Rating
AllMusic	4/5 stars
Pitchfork Media	7.9/10

Take the Kids Off Broadway is the second studio album and major debut release by the American indie rock band Foxygen, released through Jagjaguwar on July 24, 2012. The album was preceded by the release of the album's only single, "Make It Known," in May 2012.

== Track listing ==
All tracks are written by Sam France and Jonathan Rado.

No.	Title	Length
1.	"Abandon My Toys"	6:05
2.	"Make It Known"	4:51
3.	"Take the Kids Off Broadway"	3:14
4.	"Waitin' 4 U"	4:07
5.	"Teenage Alien Blues"	10:05
6.	"Why Did I Get Married?"	4:03
7.	"Middle School Dance (Song for Richard Swift)"	3:59
Total length:		36:26

== Personnel ==
Foxygen

- Sam France – vocals, guitar, piano, horns; mixing (track 1, 4)
- Jon Rado – all other instruments; mixing (track 1, 4)

Musicians and personnel

- Richard Swift – mixing (track 2, 3, 5, 6, 7)
- TW Walsh – mastering
- Onasis – artwork
- Justin Nijssen – bass (track 5), vocals (track 4)
- Jaclyn Cohen – vocals
