= Hang (Foxygen album) =

Studio album by Foxygen
- Released: January 20, 2017
- Studio: Electro-Vox Studios; (Los Angeles, CA); Spacebomb Studios; (Richmond, VA)
- Genre: Baroque pop; glam rock
- Length: 32:18
- Label: Jagjaguwar
- Producer: Foxygen

Foxygen chronology
...And Star Power (2014)	Hang (2017)	Seeing Other People (2019)

Hang is the fifth studio album by American indie rock duo Foxygen, released on January 20, 2017 on Jagjaguwar.

== Reception ==
Professional ratings
Aggregate scores
Source	Rating
Metacritic	76/100
Review scores
Source	Rating
AllMusic	4/5 stars
Pitchfork	7/10
The Observer	4/5 stars
NME	4/5 stars

In a mostly positive review for Pitchfork, Evan Rytlewski praised the album's stylistic departure from its predecessor, ...And Star Power, and its high concept direction: "Hang is the kind of investment of time, money, and patience a band can only make if they intend to stick around for a while, an audacious timpani crash of an album that satirizes its own grandiosity in real time." Writing for NME magazine, Ben Homewood gave the album a positive review, saying "...don’t take this sumptuous fifth record ... as a step towards convention. ‘Hang’ may be crisp, clear and smooth, but Foxygen are still very much a force for chaos."

== Track listing ==
All tracks are written by Foxygen.

No.	Title	Length
1.	"Follow the Leader"	4:13
2.	"Avalon"	3:46
3.	"Mrs. Adams"	4:29
4.	"America"	5:19
5.	"On Lankershim"	2:59
6.	"Upon a Hill"	1:37
7.	"Trauma"	4:45
8.	"Rise Up"	5:10

== Personnel ==
=== Foxygen ===
- Sam France – vocals, backing vocals, production
- Jonathan Rado – guitar, bass guitar, keyboards, percussion, production

=== Additional musicians ===
- Michael D'Addario – percussion
- Brian D'Addario – acoustic guitar, bass guitar, piano
- Trey Pollard – conductor, orchestral arrangements
- Matthew E. White – arrangement
- Bryce McCormick – score preparation
- Grace Bauson – harp
- Stephanie Barrett – cello
- Jason McComb – cello
- Shara Stamps – cello
- Treesa Gold – string contractor, violin
- Anna Bishop – violin
- Elise Blake – violin
- Faith Hofma – violin
- Stacy Matthews – violin
- Adrian Pintea – violin
- Melissa Sunderland – violin
- Tom Stevens – viola
- Johanna Beaver – viola
- Pinson Chanselle – chimes, timpani
- Reginald Chapman – trombone
- Scott Flynn – trombone
- Bryan Hooten – trombone
- Toby Whitaker – trombone
- JC Kuhl – tenor saxophone
- Suzi Fischer – saxophone
- Kevin Simpson – saxophone
- Bob Miller – flugelhorn, trumpet
- Rob Quallich – flugelhorn, trumpet
- Taylor Barnett – flugelhorn, trumpet
- Marcus Tenney – flugelhorn, trumpet
- Rick Reiger – clarinet, saxophone
- Jason Scott – clarinet, saxophone
- John Winn – clarinet, saxophone
- Lauren Serpa – flute
- Anthony Smith – flute, piccolo flute
- Laura Smith – oboe
- Victoria Hamrick – English horn, oboe
- Erin Lano – French horn
- Rachel Velvikis – French horn
- Amanda Winger – French horn
- Stephanie Ycaza – tuba

=== Production ===
- Adrian Olsen – engineering
- Michael Harris – engineering
- Christopher Cerullo – engineer assistance
- Cian Riordan – mixing
- Bob Ludwig – mastering
