= Spark (Whitney album) =

Studio album by Whitney
- Released: September 26, 2022
- Studio: Sonic Ranch (Tornillo); Palisade (Chicago); Spacebomb (Richmond)
- Length: 38:18
- Label: Secretly Canadian
- Producer: John Congleton; Brad Cook

Whitney chronology
Candid (2020)	Spark (2022)	Small Talk (2025)

Singles from Spark
- 1. "Real Love" Released: June 16, 2022

Professional ratings
Aggregate scores
Source	Rating
Metacritic	64/100
Review scores
Source	Rating
AllMusic	2.5/5 stars
Clash	7/10
Exclaim!	7/10
The Line of Best Fit	7/10
Pitchfork	5.8/10
Under the Radar	7.5/10

Spark is the third studio album by American rock duo Whitney. It was released on September 16, 2022, on Secretly Canadian.

== Background ==
In the fall of 2019, band members Julian Ehrlich and Max Kakacek left Chicago for Portland, Oregon, after they both had recently gone through breakups. Due to the COVID-19 pandemic, they stayed in a rented house in Portland longer than expected, where they began working on what would become Spark. They wrote the album in Portland over the course of 14 months. It was recorded at Sonic Ranch in Tornillo, Texas.

The album is noted for its classic pop sound, rather than the duo's previous folk-soul sound. Kakacek described it as "trying to make music that sounds like the early 2000s," with influences including Usher, Ne-Yo, and Gwen Stefani. The album was produced by Brad Cook and John Congleton.

The album was announced on June 16, 2022, along with the release of the single "Real Love". On September 29, 2022, the band began a North American and European tour in support of the album.

== Track listing ==
All tracks are written by Max Kakacek and Julien Ehrlich; "Real Love" written with Ziyad Asrar; "Memory" and "Terminal" written with Will Miller.

Spark track listing
No.	Title	Length
1.	"Nothing Remains"	3:00
2.	"Back Then"	2:29
3.	"Blue"	3:05
4.	"Twirl"	4:32
5.	"Real Love"	2:56
6.	"Memory"	3:53
7.	"Self"	2:40
8.	"Never Crossed My Mind"	3:25
9.	"Terminal"	3:11
10.	"Heart Will Beat"	2:51
11.	"Lost Control"	2:48
12.	"County Lines"	3:22
Total length:		38:18

== Personnel ==
Credits adapted from the album's liner notes.

=== Whitney ===
- Max Kakacek – guitar, keyboards (all tracks); bass (tracks 1–3, 5–11), synthesizer (1, 4, 6–11), drum programming (2, 5, 8, 9), sample programming (2)
- Julien Ehrlich – vocals, keyboards (all tracks); guitar (1, 2, 4, 6–8, 10, 11), drums (1, 3, 6, 11), percussion (2, 3, 5, 10, 11), vibraphone (8), synthesizer (9)

=== Additional musicians ===
- Will Miller – keyboards (1, 3, 6, 9), horns (3, 4, 7, 9, 11), synthesizer programming (4, 6, 9), EWI (4, 7, 9, 11), synthesizer (5, 11), trumpet (11)
- Lia Kohl – cello (1, 3, 4, 9)
- Whitney Johnson – viola, violin (1, 4, 9)
- Brad Cook – bass (4, 6), synthesizer (4, 7), drum programming (7)
- Trey Pollard – string arrangement, conductor (6)
- Ellen Riccio – violin (6)
- Adrian Pintea – violin (6)
- Stacy Matthews – violin (6)
- Jeannette Jang – violin (6)
- Treesa Gold – violin (6)
- Anna Bishop – violin (6)
- Molly Sharp – viola (6)
- Hyoojoo Uh – viola (6)
- Fitz Gary – viola (6)
- Jason McComb – cello (6)
- Nate Mercereau – additional guitar arrangement (8), additional synthesizer arrangement (9)
- Nick Hakim – keyboards (8)
- Malcolm Brown – additional bass arrangement (8)
- Wills McKenna – flute (9, 10)
- Rob Moose – string arrangement (12)
- Sam Gendel – saxophone (12)

=== Technical and visuals ===
- John Congleton – production (all tracks), mixing (12)
- Jacob Portrait – additional production (2), mixing (1–3, 5–11)
- Ziyad Asrar – mixing (4), additional engineering (all tracks)
- Gerardo Ordoñez – engineering
- Heba Kadry – mastering
- Michelle Alvarez – additional engineering
- Curtis Fye – additional engineering
- Driely Carter – art direction, packaging
- Victor Clemente – art direction, packaging
- Christoph Gromer – art direction, packaging

== Charts ==
Chart performance for Spark
Chart (2022)	Peak position
US Top Current Album Sales (Billboard)	91
