= Whitney (band) =

American indie rock band

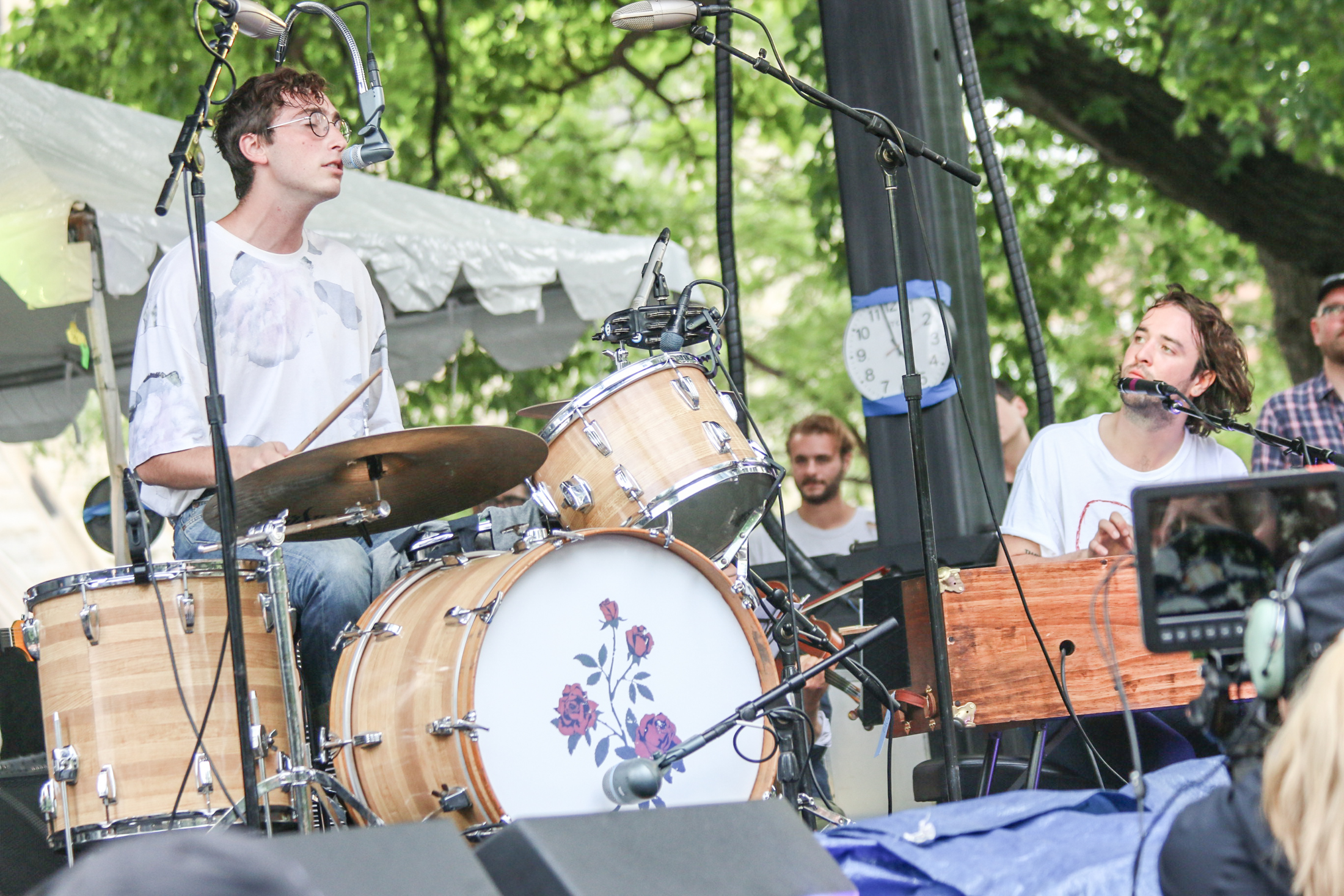
- Whitney performing at Pitchfork Music Festival in 2016

Background information
- Origin: Chicago, Illinois, U.S.
- Genres: Indie rock; indie folk; soft rock; country soul; indie pop
- Years active: 2015–present
- Labels: Secretly Canadian, Spinning Top Music
- Spinoff of: Smith Westerns
- Members: Max Kakacek; Julien Ehrlich; Josiah Marshall; Will Miller; Malcolm Brown; Print Chouteau; Charles Glanders; Ziyad Asrar; Colin Croom
- Website: whitneytheband.com

Whitney is an American indie rock band formed in Chicago in 2015. The band was formed shortly after the breakup of members Max Kakacek and Julien Ehrlich's band Smith Westerns in late 2014. They released their debut album, Light Upon the Lake, in 2016, and have since released the albums Forever Turned Around (2019), Candid (2020), Spark (2022), and Small Talk (2025).

== Career ==
After the breakup of Smith Westerns in 2014, guitarist Max Kakacek joined with drummer Julien Ehrlich, who also played drums for Unknown Mortal Orchestra, to form Whitney. As roommates, the duo shared songwriting duties while Ehrlich became the main vocalist. Initially the band also featured members of the Touching Voids, Ehrlich's previous band. In June 2015, the band made the song "No Matter Where We Go" available digitally through the Lead Riders label. It included former Smith Westerns member Ziyad Asrar on rhythm guitar, Malcolm Brown on keyboards, bassist Josiah Marshall and brass player Will Miller.

In 2015, the band played around thirty shows, mostly in support of other artists. This included Tobias Jesso Jr., who got the band in contact with Jonathan Rado, who would produce their debut studio album. In September of that year, they joined Rado at his Los Angeles home studio to record. In January 2016, the band released the single "No Woman" supported by a video and toured Europe in anticipation of their new album. They also performed at the 2016 SXSW Festival.

On June 3, 2016, the band's debut album Light Upon the Lake was released, and shortly afterwards they embarked on their first headlining European tour.

In 2017, the band announced a new demos album with a previously unreleased song, "You and Me". In March 2017, Whitney released two new songs, both covers: "You've Got a Woman" and "Gonna Hurry (As Slow as I Can)". Light Upon the Lake: Demo Recordings was released on November 10, 2017.

In an interview published in April 2019, the band mentioned their second official album, due in 2019, would deal with "fear, confusion, and substance abuse". They shared a song titled "FTA" from the album in June 2019, and released the lead single “Giving Up” on June 6.

The album Forever Turned Around was released on August 30, 2019. It was partially recorded at a winery in Cotati, California. To celebrate the release, Chicago mayor Lori Lightfoot announced August 30 as Whitney Day.

In May 2020, Whitney and Waxahatchee released covers of both "Take Me Home, Country Roads" and "Rain". Both tracks appeared on Whitney's album of covers titled Candid, which was released on August 14, 2020, and also included covers of "Strange Overtones" (originally by David Byrne and Brian Eno) and "Hammond Song" (originally by The Roches).

On June 16, 2022, Whitney released their single "Real Love" and announced that their next album Spark would be released on September 16, 2022, on Secretly Canadian. The album features production by John Congleton and Brad Cook. On December 9, 2022, Whitney released the EP Live at Electric Lady, which includes a cover of Beach House's "Other People".

In May 2025, Whitney released the single "Darling", from their upcoming fifth studio album, Small Talk, which was released on November 7, 2025. They also released a music video for their single "Dandelions".

On June 5, 2026, ten years after the release of their first studio album, Whitney released Light Upon The Lake (10^{th} Anniversary Edition). The album included four different recordings of previous songs, along with a cover of "So Sad (To Watch Good Love Go Bad)" (originally by The Everly Brothers).

== Style ==
Whitney's musical style has been described as indie rock, indie folk, soft rock, country soul and indie pop.

Ehrlich outlined the approach to songwriting as "when we were writing for Whitney, we were doing what we wanted to do, the music was really freeing". Paul Lester in the Guardian described the band as "think Bon Iver, with elements of folk and country, only given a Chicago soul makeover". They cite Levon Helm and Allen Toussaint as inspiration.

== Discography ==
=== Albums ===
Studio albums

- Light Upon the Lake (2016)
- Forever Turned Around (2019)
- Candid (2020)
- Spark (2022)
- Small Talk (2025)

Reissues

- Light Upon The Lake (10^{th} Anniversary Edition) (2026)

EPs

- Live at Electric Lady (2022)

Demo albums

- Light Upon the Lake: Demo Recordings (2017)

=== Singles ===
- "No Matter Where We Go" (June 2015)
- "No Woman" (January 2016)
- "You've Got a Woman / Gonna Hurry (As Slow as I Can)" (March 2017)
- "You and Me" (Demo) (September 2017)
- "Giving Up" (June 2019)
- "FTA" (November 2019)
- "Far, Far Away" (November 2019)
- "Rain" (May 2020)
- "Take Me Home, Country Roads" (May 2020)
- "Hammond Song" (July 2020)
- "Strange Overtones" (August 2020)
- "Real Love" (June 2022)
- "Blue / Twirl" (July 2022)
- "Memory / County Lines" (August 2022)
- "For A While" (January 2023)
- "Kansas" (August 2023)
- "Darling" (May 2025)
- "Dandelions" (July 2025)
- "Back to the Wind" (September 2025)
- "Damage" (October 2025)
- "Evangeline" (November 2025)
- "See You Later, I'm Gone" (May 2026)
