= We Are the 21st Century Ambassadors of Peace & Magic =

Studio album by Foxygen
- Released: January 22, 2013
- Recorded: 2011–2012
- Genres: Pop; psychedelic rock
- Length: 36:39
- Label: Jagjaguwar
- Producer: Richard Swift

Foxygen chronology
| Take the Kids Off Broadway (2011) | We Are the 21st Century Ambassadors of Peace & Magic (2013) | ...And Star Power (2014) |

Singles from We Are the 21st Century Ambassadors of Peace & Magic
- 1. "Shuggie" Released: October 4, 2012; 2. "San Francisco" Released: January 9, 2013; 3. "No Destruction" Released: May 28, 2013

We Are the 21st Century Ambassadors of Peace & Magic is the third studio album by American indie rock duo Foxygen, released on January 22, 2013 through Jagjaguwar.

The album was promoted pre-release with the singles "Shuggie" on October 4, 2012, "San Francisco" on January 9, 2013. After the album's release, "No Destruction" was released as the third and final single on May 23, 2013.

== Critical reception ==
Professional ratings
Aggregate scores
| Source | Rating |
|---|---|
| AnyDecentMusic? | 7.3/10 |
| Metacritic | 80/100 |
Review scores
| Source | Rating |
| AllMusic | 4.5/5 stars |
| Consequence of Sound | 3.5/5 stars |
| DIY | 8/10 |
| The Irish Times | 4/5 stars |
| Mojo | 4/5 stars |
| NME | 8/10 |
| The Observer | 3/5 stars |
| Paste | 8.2/10 |
| Pitchfork | 8.4/10 |
| Under the Radar | 8/10 |

Christian Taylor 90FM said of the album: "On the whole, the album carries hints of Tame Impala's recent album, Lonerism, and adds a whole lot of swagger. Fans of Pond, the Velvet Underground, and Lou Reed should find plenty to love in this phenomenal piece of retro-rock work." Austin Trunick of Under the Radar said: "The record taps into old AM hippie rock territory ... Motown, soul, acid rock ... and even classic French pop." In a favourable review for NME, Lisa Wright states that "Foxygen have managed to spray every shade from their bizarre, Technicolor imaginations onto a record that bursts with lovable eccentricities, but never tries too hard."

== Track listing ==
| No. | Title | Length |
|---|---|---|
| 1. | "In the Darkness" | 2:00 |
| 2. | "No Destruction" | 4:55 |
| 3. | "On Blue Mountain" | 5:50 |
| 4. | "San Francisco" | 3:47 |
| 5. | "Bowling Trophies" | 1:47 |
| 6. | "Shuggie" | 3:22 |
| 7. | "Oh Yeah" | 5:16 |
| 8. | "We Are the 21st Century; Ambassadors of Peace & Magic" | 4:27 |
| 9. | "Oh No 2" | 5:22 |
| Total length: | | 36:39 |

== Personnel ==
Foxygen

- Sam France – lead and backing vocals, piano, horns
- Jonathan Rado – guitars, bass, piano, organ, percussion, synthesizers, mellotron

Additional musicians

- Richard Swift – piano, organ, guitars, bass, drums, percussion, vocals, synthesizers, mellotron, theremin, glockenspiel
- Jessie Baylin – backing vocals (track 4)
- Sarah Versprille – backing vocals (track 4)
- Crumbs – backing vocals (track 3)
- Luke Suzumoto – handclaps, artwork
