= ...And Star Power =

Studio album by Foxygen
- Released: October 14, 2014
- Recorded: 2013–2014
- Genres: Psychedelic pop; psychedelic rock; glam rock; garage rock; folk
- Length: 82:07
- Label: Jagjaguwar
- Producer: Foxygen

Foxygen chronology
We Are the 21st Century Ambassadors of Peace & Magic (2013)	...And Star Power (2014)	Hang (2017)

Singles from ...And Star Power
- 1. "How Can You Really" Released: July 30, 2014; 2. "Cosmic Vibrations" Released: September 3, 2014

...And Star Power is the fourth studio album by American indie rock duo Foxygen, released October 14, 2014 through Jagjaguwar. It is a double album that follows a loose concept around the eponymous fictional band Star Power.

Unlike their previous full-length, the album was recorded almost entirely at home and in various locations in Los Angeles, such as the Chateau Marmont and Beverly Hills Hotel.

Professional ratings
Aggregate scores
Source	Rating
Metacritic	62/100
Review scores
Source	Rating
AllMusic	2.5/5 stars
The A.V. Club	B
Consequence	B−
Los Angeles Times	2/5 stars
The Observer	2/5 stars
Paste	8.8/10
Pitchfork	7.0/10
PopMatters	5/10
Rolling Stone	2.5/5 stars
Slant Magazine	4/5 stars

== Track listing ==
Pitchfork released the track listing on July 30, 2014.

Side One, Part One: The Hits
No.	Title	Length
1.	"Star Power Airlines"	1:11
2.	"How Can You Really"	3:05
3.	"Coulda Been My Love"	3:52
4.	"Cosmic Vibrations"	5:01
5.	"You & I"	2:17

Side One, Part Two: Star Power Suite
No.	Title	Length
6.	"Star Power I: Overture"	1:41
7.	"Star Power II: Star Power Nite"	2:14
8.	"Star Power III: What Are We Good For"	3:20
9.	"Star Power IV: Ooh Ooh"	1:50

Side Two: The Paranoid Side
No.	Title	Length
10.	"I Don't Have Anything/The Gate"	4:35
11.	"Mattress Warehouse"	4:26
12.	"666"	2:05
13.	"Flowers"	3:11
14.	"Wally's Farm"	1:58
15.	"Cannibal Holocaust"	3:48
16.	"Hot Summer"	1:49

Side Three: Scream: Journey Through Hell
No.	Title	Length
17.	"Cold Winter/Freedom"	6:14
18.	"Can't Contextualize My Mind"	3:54
19.	"Brooklyn Police Station"	4:21
20.	"The Game"	2:21
21.	"Freedom II"	3:53
22.	"Talk"	4:07

Side Four: Hang on to Love
No.	Title	Length
23.	"Everyone Needs Love"	6:47
24.	"Hang"	4:07

== Personnel ==
Foxygen

- Sam France – vocals, guitar, drums, piano, horns
- Jonathan Rado – guitar, bass guitar, keyboards, piano, drums
