= Small Talk (Whitney album) =

Studio album by Whitney
- Released: November 7, 2025
- Recorded: Mid-2024
- Length: 35:55
- Label: AWAL
- Producer: Whitney

Whitney chronology
Spark (2022)	Small Talk (2025)

Singles from Small Talk
- 1. "Darling" Released: May 28, 2025; 2. "Dandelions" Released: July 16, 2025; 3. "Back to the Wind" Released: September 10, 2025; 4. "Damage" Released: October 8, 2025; 5. "Evangeline" Released: November 4, 2025

Small Talk is the fourth studio album by American indie rock band Whitney, released on November 7, 2025, on AWAL.

== Background ==
The album was recorded in mid-2024 and produced by the duo, Julien Ehrlich and Max Kakacek. On May 28, 2025, Whitney released the single "Darling", their first new music since 2023. On July 16, 2025, they released the single "Dandelions" and announced their upcoming fifth studio album, the follow-up to 2022's Spark.

== Critical reception ==
Professional ratings
Aggregate scores
Source	Rating
Metacritic	72/100
Review scores
Source	Rating
AllMusic	4/5 stars
Pitchfork	4.8/10
The Line of Best Fit	8/10
PopMatters	8/10

Dylan Weinert of Newcity called Small Talk "a masterpiece." Luke Winstanley of The Line of Best Fit gave the album an 8/10, writing, "when Whitney are operating in this ecstatic sphere of glorious, glacial sounds of the late 60s and early 70s, they’re nothing short of irresistible." However, Grace Robins-Somerville of Pitchfork called the album "the most anonymous, uninspiring music you can possibly imagine."

== Track listing ==
All tracks are written by Julien Ehrlich and Max Kakacek, with additional writers noted.

Small Talk track listing
No.	Title	Writer(s)	Length
1.	"Silent Exchange"		3:41
2.	"Won't You Speak Your Mind"		3:17
3.	"The Thread"		3:01
4.	"Damage"	Ziyad Asrar	3:34
5.	"Dandelions"	Asrar	3:16
6.	"Islands (Really Something)"		3:12
7.	"In the Saddle"	Will Miller	2:48
8.	"Evangeline" (featuring Madison Cunningham)		3:26
9.	"Back to the Wind"	Asrar	3:20
10.	"Small Talk"	Miller	3:27
11.	"Darling"		2:53
Total length:			35:55

== Personnel ==
Credits adapted from the album's liner notes.

=== Whitney ===
- Julien Ehrlich – vocals, drums, acoustic guitar, piano, organ, percussion, auxiliary percussion, production
- Max Kakacek – acoustic guitar, electric guitar, piano, Wurlitzer, organ, EBow, banjo, Minotaur, production

=== Additional contributors ===
- Brian Seyler – saxophone
- Colin Croom – pedal steel
- JJ Kirkpatrick – trumpet
- Katie Stewart – violin
- Madison Cunningham – backing vocals, vocals
- Malcolm Brown – bass guitar, piano, Wurlitzer, organ
- Vivian McConnell – flute
- Whitney Johnson – viola
- Will Miller – trumpet, piano, Wurlitzer
- Ziyad Asrar – piano, engineering, mixing
- Heba Kadry – mastering
- Alexa Viscius – cover photo, creative direction
- Jessica Viscius – creative direction
- Bradley Pinkerton – packaging design, layout
