= Jurrassic Exxplosion Phillipic =

Studio album by Foxygen
- Released: 2007
- Recorded: 2006–2007
- Genre: Avant-garde; experimental rock; psychedelic rock; indie rock
- Length: 58:52

Foxygen chronology
Jurrassic Exxplosion Phillipic (2007)	Take the Kids Off Broadway (2011)

Jurrassic Exxplosion Phillipic or The Jurrasic Explosion Philippic is the debut album by indie rock duo Foxygen, who "self-produced a string of adventurous records throughout high school." Jonathan Rado described the album to Interview Magazine as a "30 track space opera." It was initially released in 2007, but then a further release of a free download link was shown by Foxygen on social network sites such as Facebook and Twitter.

It was recorded when the band members were 15 years old.

We were babies. Neither one of us had hit puberty yet. Our voices were extremely high.

AL: When you played shows back when you were in High School, did you have a driver’s license, or did your parents have to drive you to shows?
Sam: Yeah. We played at the Whisky a-go-go a few times. Most of our shows were at school. It would be some class show where we would fuck around on melodica and guitar. Our early influences were The Brian Jonestown Massacre. We watched Dig The Movie every day. We were into the fact that Anton “played everything.” We wanted to play everything. So I went on eBay and bought every strange instrument. I would buy an accordion or a xylophone. We would bring them to shows and we couldn’t really play any of them. But it worked for some reason. We tried to get a sitar for a long time.

== Track listing ==
All tracks are written by Sam France and Jonathan Rado.

No.	Title	Length
1.	"Psychotron Schoolyard Philippic"	0:47
2.	"Fun Fun Fun Jesus!/Senoirita Anenome"	2:12
3.	"<<<Foxygem>>>"	0:06
4.	"Theme from Le Amputees"	2:10
5.	"Theme from Le Amputees (Reprise)"	0:30
6.	""NICO""	2:20
7.	"...Concerning the Abduction of Lil' James Kidd"	1:38
8.	"MAMA!!!"	2:09
9.	"Jesus Can't Help Him, (Now!)"	1:58
10.	"Psychotron - Swamp - Philippic"	0:15
11.	"Cat Night Even Specctraticca"	2:46
12.	"What (a) Wonderful World"	2:09
13.	"--->13<---"	0:06
14.	"Sepository Nihilist Blues"	1:01
15.	"YOU Can Fight EVIL!!!"	1:45
16.	"THE Apocalypse"	0:38
17.	"Psychotron "Drop-off-Procedure, '1.8.7.2.5'""	0:40
18.	"Caitlin"	1:15
19.	"Quintin: Stegosaurus/Mulla Surf Legend"	1:26
20.	"A) 21st Century Picnic Redemption @ Kava Deme B) We've Only Just Begun, Chile"	0:53
21.	"Pumpkin Patch"	1:59
22.	"Lil' James (vs.) The Government of the United States of America"	0:25
23.	"Octosurf, M'lady"	1:20
24.	"Cosmic Calendar"	0:44
25.	"The Mailman's Daughter"	2:13
26.	""Funky Palace Razorbladez""	2:24
27.	"(Rado's Dream)"	3:12
28.	""Unicorn Soup" Philippic"	1:42
29.	"Sad Toyz"	1:43
30.	"The "Get Down""	3:01
31.	"Krissmuss Tyme"	0:17
32.	"The "UbChub" Variations"	1:26
33.	"Phantasmic Ex-Eggspulsion"	3:14
34.	""Deep Down Dirty" Revisited"	3:23
35.	"Kidney Smoothie"	1:54
36.	"End Hole"	2:56
Total length:		58:52
