= Cut Worms (album) =

Studio album by Cut Worms
- Released: July 21, 2023
- Recorded: Brooklyn, NY; Catskill, NY
- Length: 34:52
- Label: Jagjaguwar
- Producer: Max Clarke

Cut Worms chronology
Nobody Lives Here Anymore (2020)	Cut Worms (2023)

Singles from Cut Worms
- 1. "Ballad of the Texas King" Released: 31 May 2023

Cut Worms is the third studio album by American indie rock musician Cut Worms (the music project of singer-songwriter Max Clarke). It was released on Jagjaguwar on July 21, 2023. The album debuted at number 69 on the Billboard Top Current Album Sales chart.

== Background ==
Clarke was influenced by the songwriting of Brian Wilson, emphasizing and four-and five-part harmonies. The album features Brian D'Addario and Michael D'Addario of The Lemon Twigs and Rick Spataro of Florist, as well as bandmates John Andrews on keyboards, Keven Louis Lareau on bass, and Noah Bond on drums. The lead single, "Ballad of the Texas King," was released on May 31, 2023.

== Critical reception ==
Professional ratings
Aggregate scores
Source	Rating
Metacritic	81/100
Review scores
Source	Rating
AllMusic	4/5 stars
The Line of Best Fit	8/10
Paste	8.6/10
New Noise Magazine	3.5/5 stars

Cut Worms received universal acclaim from contemporary music critics. At Metacritic, which assigns a normalized rating of 0-100 based on reviews from mainstream critics, the album received an average score of 81, based on 9 reviews. Matt Mitchell of Paste called it "one of the best rock 'n' roll records of 2023." Samantha Sullivan of Flood Magazine wrote, "Clarke combines the larger-than-life lore of yesteryear smash hits and forgotten bargain-bin gems to craft a record that's retro yet refreshing." John Amen of Beats Per Minute gave the album a score of 75% and wrote, "While Clarke remains tethered to his sources, he still manages to flap his way toward the sun. In this version of the myth, his wings hold up, his father congratulates him, and the gods give him a brief yet sincere ovation."

== Track listing ==
All music is composed by Max Clarke.

No.	Title	Length
1.	"Don't Fade Out"	4:11
2.	"Take it and Smile"	3:56
3.	"Ballad of the Texas King"	3:03
4.	"I'll Never Make It"	5:37
5.	"Is it Magic?"	3:33
6.	"Let's Go Out on the Town"	2:34
7.	"Living Inside"	3:32
8.	"Use Your Love! (Right Now)"	3:35
9.	"Too Bad"	4:46
Total length:		34:52

== Charts ==
Chart (2023)	Peak position
Billboard Top Current Album Sales	69
