= The Locket =

The Locket may refer to:

- The Locket (1946 film), an American film directed by John Brahm
- The Locket (1970 film), a Spanish film directed by Rafael Gil
- The Locket (2002 film), an American television film directed by Karen Arthur
- "The Locket" (Dynasty), a television episode
- "The Locket" (Farscape), a television episode
- "The Locket" (How I Met Your Mother), a television episode
- The Locket, a 1998 novel by Richard Paul Evans

== See also ==
- Locket (disambiguation)
