= Seeing Other People (album) =

Studio album by Foxygen
- Released: April 26, 2019
- Studio: Sonora Recorders
- Genres: Experimental; pop rock
- Length: 37:01
- Label: Jagjaguwar
- Producer: Foxygen

Foxygen chronology
Hang (2017)	Seeing Other People (2019)

Singles from Seeing Other People
- 1. "Livin' A Lie" Released: February 6, 2019; 2. "Work" Released: April 16, 2019

Professional ratings
Aggregate scores
Source	Rating
Metacritic	68/100
Review scores
Source	Rating
AllMusic	3.5/5 stars
DIY	3.5/5 stars
Exclaim!	7/10
musicOMH	4/5 stars
Pitchfork	5.0/10

Seeing Other People is the sixth and final studio album by American duo Foxygen. It was released on April 26, 2019, through Jagjaguwar.

== Critical reception ==
Seeing Other People received generally favorable reviews from contemporary music critics. At Metacritic, which assigns a normalized rating out of 100 to reviews from mainstream critics, the album received an average score of 68, based on 10 reviews.

There was no tour for the album.

== Track listing ==
No.	Title	Length
1.	"Work"	3:16
2.	"Mona"	4:15
3.	"Seeing Other People"	3:02
4.	"Face the Facts"	3:20
5.	"Livin' a Lie"	4:02
6.	"The Thing Is"	3:37
7.	"News"	5:05
8.	"Flag at Half-Mast"	5:31
9.	"The Conclusion"	4:53
Total length:		37:01
