= Cut Worms =

American music project

- Origin: Brooklyn, New York, U.S.
- Genres: Soft rock; indie pop; bedroom pop; indie folk
- Years active: 2015–present
- Label: Jagjaguwar
- Members: Max Clarke
- Website: cut-worms.com

Cut Worms is the music project of American singer, songwriter, and musician Max Clarke.

== History ==
Clarke, known by his stage name Cut Worms, is a singer, songwriter, and musician hailing from Strongsville, Ohio who is currently based in Brooklyn, New York. He has opened for bands such as Jenny Lewis, Kevin Morby, The Lemon Twigs and Michael Rault. Cut Worms released the EP Alien Sunset in 2017.

In 2018, Cut Worms released the debut album, Hollow Ground, on Jagjaguwar. Hollow Ground received a rating of 7.2 on Pitchfork.

In 2020, he released the double album Nobody Lives Here Anymore. His third, self-titled album was released on Jagjaguwar on July 21, 2023.

== Discography ==
Albums

- Hollow Ground – 2018, Jagjaguwar
- Nobody Lives Here Anymore – 2020, Jagjaguwar
- Cut Worms – 2023, Jagjaguwar
- Transmitter – 2026, Jagjaguwar

EPs

- Alien Sunset – 2017, Jagjaguwar
