= Crumb (band) =

American indie rock band

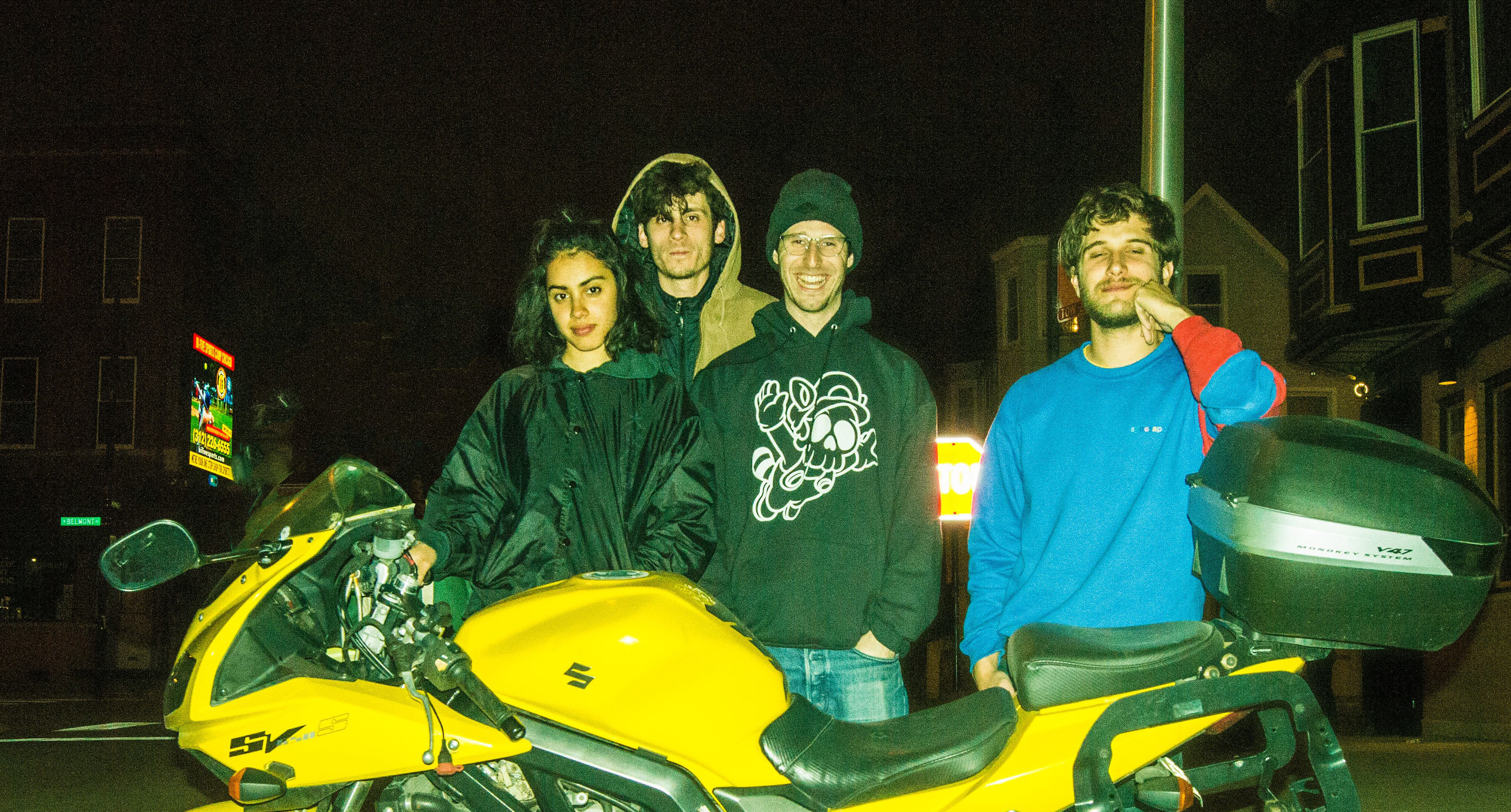
- Crumb in 2018

Background information
- Origin: Boston, Massachusetts
- Genres: Indie rock; psychedelic rock; neo-psychedelia; dream pop; trip hop; jazz rock; acid jazz
- Years active: 2016–present
- Label: Crumb Records
- Members: Lila Ramani; Jesse Brotter; Bri Aronow; Jonathan Gilad
- Website: www.crumbtheband.com

Crumb is an American psychedelic rock band. The group is a collaboration of Brooklyn-based musicians Lila Ramani (guitar, vocals), Jesse Brotter (bass, vocals), Bri Aronow (synthesizers, keyboard, saxophone), and Jonathan Gilad (drums), who met while attending Tufts University.

== History ==
Ramani, Brotter, Aronow, and Gilad met at Tufts University, often living and playing together until 2016, when they developed and recorded a collection of songs Ramani had started writing in high school and college. The collaboration resulted in the band’s first two EPs, Crumb (2016) and Locket (2017), the latter of which was released while the band was split between Boston and New York. Both EPs were independently released, with limited vinyl runs and cassettes released by independent record label Citrus City Records.

Crumb went on to release their debut full-length album, Jinx, on June 14, 2019. The album received positive reviews from music critics.

On March 10, 2021, the band released "Trophy", the first single since 2019. The music video was directed by Haoyan of America and features animations by Truba Animation. Their second full-length album Ice Melt was released on April 30, 2021.

In 2023 they released the single "Le Temple Volant" with French artist Melody's Echo Chamber.

In March 2024 the band announced their third studio album AMAMA and released a single of the same name. The second single called The Bug was released on April 24th, and the album was released on May 17, 2024.

== Musical style and influences ==
Crumb's music draws influence from jazz and psychedelic music. AllMusic called the style "dreamy indie pop", and described it as sounding "spaced out". Indie Current described Crumb's sound on Locket as psychedelic slacker rock. Paste magazine called their sound a meld of "60s psych, loose jazz, and freeform indie rock into a soothing pop amalgamation." Others^{[who]} described them as psychedelic jazzy lo-fi dream pop.

== Discography ==
=== Studio albums ===
- Jinx (2019)
- Ice Melt (2021)
- AMAMA (2024)

=== EPs ===
- Crumb (2016)
- Locket (2017)

=== Singles ===
- "Trophy" (2021)
- "BNR" / "Balloon" (2021)
- "Crushxd" (2023)
- "Dust Bunny" (2023)
- "Le Temple Volant" (2023) (with Melody's Echo Chamber)
- "AMAMA" (2024)
- "The Bug" (2024)
