= Locket (EP) =

EP by Crumb
- Released: June 23, 2017
- Genres: psychedelic, indie rock
- Length: 15:10
- Producers: John Scott, Crumb

Crumb chronology
| Crumb (2016) | Locket (2017) | Jinx (2019) |

Locket is the second extended play (EP) by the American psychedelic rock band Crumb. The song "Locket" from the EP has become one of the band's best performing songs, currently with over 118 million plays on Spotify.

== Music ==
The instrumentals on the EP have been described as being located in a "cloudy-but-clean pop/jazz realm" with themes and feelings of "detachment, melancholia, nostalgia, and uncertainty."

== Critical reception ==
Professional ratings
Review scores
| Source | Rating |
|---|---|
| Secret Meaning | 75/100 |

In a 75/100 review, Secret Meaning said of the instrumentals "Everything seems to happen in its own time, at the right time", while praising Ramani's voice. The EP was named Bandcamp's Album of the Day on July 17 2017, with the site noting its "expansive sounds" while describing the album as in the categories of psychedelic and indie rock. NPR specifically praised the song "Locket" along with its music video directed by Haoyan of America, noting both the song and video's "acid trip" psychedelic nature.

== Track listing ==
All tracks are written by Crumb.

| No. | Title | Length |
|---|---|---|
| 1. | "Plants" | 3:11 |
| 2. | "Recently Played" | 2:00 |
| 3. | "Thirty-Nine" | 4:39 |
| 4. | "Locket" | 5:18 |
| Total length: | | 15:10 |

== Personnel ==
Crumb

- Lila Ramani – guitar, vocals
- Jesse Brotter – bass, vocals
- Bri Aronow – synthesizers, keyboard, saxophone
- Jonathan Gilad – drums

Additional personnel

- John Scott – producer
- Adam P. Cissel – mastering
- Isaac Baird, Lilly Donlon, Jesse Brotter, and Lila Ramani – artwork
