= Cuco (musician) =

American singer-songwriter (born 1998)

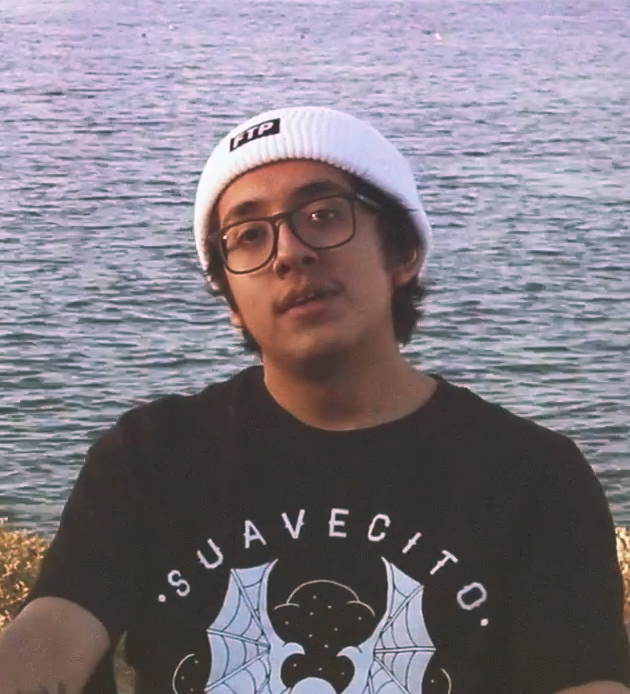
- Cuco in November 2018

Background information
- Born: Omar Banos; June 26, 1998 (age 28); Inglewood, California, U.S.
- Origin: Hawthorne, California, U.S.
- Genres: Bedroom pop; indie pop; synth-pop; indie rock; lo-fi
- Occupations: Singer-songwriter, producer
- Years active: 2015–present
- Label: Interscope
- Website: cucomusic.com

YouTube information
- Channel: Cuco
- Genres: Music; vlogging
- Subscribers: 2.06 million
- Views: 957.51 million
- Last updated: 29 March 2026

Omar Banos (born June 26, 1998), known professionally as Cuco, is an American singer-songwriter from Hawthorne, California. His music has been described as a blend of elements from bossa nova, indie-pop, and psychedelia.

Teaching himself how to make his own music, Cuco self-released his first EP, Wannabewithu in 2016, which featured some of his first songs to go viral, "Lover is a Day" and "Amor de Siempre". He then released his second EP, Songs4u, the following year. Cuco rose to prominence following the release of his 2017 single, "Lo Que Siento", allowing him to drop out of college to pursue a music career.

Signing with Interscope Records in 2019, he released his first studio album, Para Mi (2019). He released his second album, Fantasy Gateway in 2022, created with producers, Manuel Lara and Andres Rebellon. He released his third EP, Hitchhiker on November 10, 2023. In 2025, he released his third album Ridin'.

== Early life ==
Omar Banos was born an only child in Inglewood, California, on June 26, 1998, to immigrant Mexican parents. His mother, Irma, came from the city of Puebla, while his father, Adolfo, came from Mexico City. He grew up in the city of Hawthorne, California, and began playing music at the age of eight. He had experimented with trumpet, guitar, keyboard, drums, bass guitar, mellophone and French horn before the age of 15. Banos attended junior school in Lennox and graduated from Hawthorne High School where he played in the school marching band as well as the jazz band.

== Career ==
=== 2015: Heavy Trip ===
After graduating, Banos uploaded a slide guitar cover of Sleep Walk by Santo & Johnny to YouTube, which gained thousands of views. He began producing and releasing songs from his parents' home and releasing them onto Bandcamp and SoundCloud. In January 2015, Banos released his first EP on Bandcamp, titled Heavy Trip. In the same year, Banos had released his first song, "Yeah" on SoundCloud under the moniker of Heavy Trip. He then switched to Cuco, which was a nickname given to him by his mother as a child.

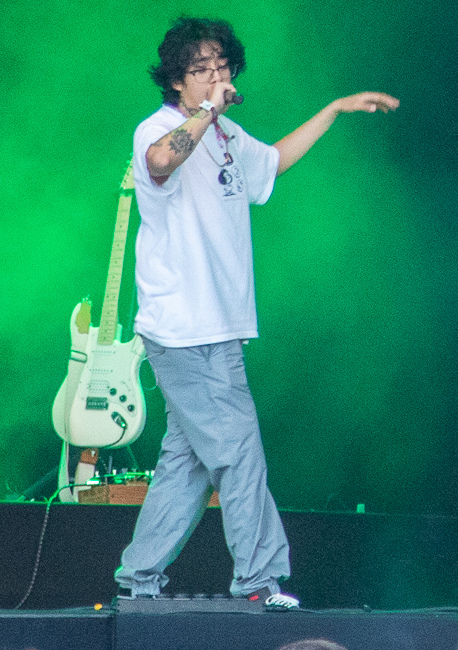
Cuco performing at Primavera Sound in May 2019

=== 2016–2017: Wannabewithu and Songs4u ===
By the age of 18, Banos had self-produced his first mixtape Wannabewithu in 2016, after teaching himself how to use Ableton Live software. Cuco released his second mixtape, Songs4u in 2017 when he started playing at clubs in Southern California, selling out his first two venues. Cuco released his first single "Lo Que Siento" in 2017, which has reached over 400 million streams on Spotify alone. Following the success of "Lo Que Siento," Cuco dropped out after a year of attending Santa Monica City College to pursue a career in music.

=== 2018–2019: Para Mi ===
Cuco collaborated with American singer Clairo for the single "Drown", which was released in August 2018. He then collaborated with Polyphia on a track called "So Strange" off their album New Levels New Devils, which was released in October 2018. Cuco played alongside saxophonist Kenny G at Coachella in April 2018, as well as at Lollapalooza in August 2018. In February 2019, he collaborated with his childhood Chicano rap idols MC Magic and Lil Rob on a track called "Search". After a bidding war that lasted two years, Banos signed under Interscope Records in March 2019. On April 2, 2019, Cuco released "Hydrocodone," the lead single for Para Mi, before releasing "Bossa No Sé" with Jean Carter on May 22, 2019. Cuco later released his debut studio album, Para Mi, on July 26. The album touches on recent problems that Cuco has experienced first-hand, including a tour bus accident that sent him and his band to hospital. It debuted at 94 on the US Billboard 200.

=== 2022–present: Fantasy Gateway and Ridin' ===
On April 29, 2022, Cuco released "Caution" as the lead single from his sophomore studio album, Fantasy Gateway. On July 22, 2022, Fantasy Gateway was released via Interscope Records. The 12-track LP includes appearances from Kacey Musgraves, Adriel Favela, Bratty, and DannyLux. On March 10, 2023, he collaborated with indie pop band the Marías on the song "Si Me Voy", later performing at the Camp Flog Gnaw music festival in November of that year. He released his third EP, Hitchhiker, on November 10, 2023, which included 6 tracks. He released his third studio album, Ridin', on May 9, 2025. It is a Chicano soul album inspired by norteño and lowrider culture, mixed by Tom Elmhirst, and influenced by artists Barbara Lewis, Ralfi Pagan, Joe Bataan, Smokey Robinson, Al Green, Brenton Wood, Thee Sacred Souls, Thee Sinseers, and Los Yesterdays.

== Artistry ==
=== Musical style and songwriting ===
Banos' musical style blends elements of bossa nova and indie pop. Suzy Exposito from Rolling Stone described his music as "psychedelia-soaked love ballads". Brett Calwood told LA Weekly that Banos's music has "smooth Latin influences with a nostalgic lean". Banos blends English and Spanish lyrics over what he describes as "alternative dream pop" melodies that have "a lot of synthesizers" and "a lot of 808's".

=== Influences ===
Banos grew up listening to Chicano rap from names such as Lil Rob, Baby Bash and MC Magic, as well as Spanish rock, boleros and other old ballads that his parents would play around the house. He listens to jazz, classical music and trap music, and has cited Kevin Parker of Tame Impala and Ariel Pink as some of his major musical influences. In an interview with Jesse Thorn from Bullseye, Banos described how the song, "Feels Like We Only Go Backwards" by Tame Impala helped him with visualizing his career in music and navigating his life in high school. Banos also points to Pink Floyd as an influence for his music, which can be heard on songs like 2022's "Pendant"

== Discography ==
=== Albums ===
List of studio albums, with selected details and chart positions.
Title	Album details	Peak chart positions	
Title	Album details	US	US Alt.
Para Mi	Released: July 26, 2019; Label: Interscope PS; Formats: CD, digital download, streaming, vinyl	94	6
Fantasy Gateway	Released: July 22, 2022; Label: Interscope PS; Formats: CD, digital download, streaming, vinyl	62	
Ridin'	Released: May 9, 2025; Label: Interscope PS; Formats: CD, digital download, streaming, vinyl, cassette		

=== Extended plays ===
Wannabewithu (2016)
No.	Title	Length
1.	"Lover Is a Day"	7:37
2.	"Cupid's Quiver"	4:20
3.	"Amor de Siempre"	5:21
4.	"When We Meet"	4:37
5.	"Mindwinder"	1:56
6.	"Lonelylife"	5:20
7.	"1Night"	2:19
Total length:		27:19

Songs4u (2017)
No.	Title	Length
1.	"One and Only"	3:26
2.	"Winter's Ballad"	4:37
3.	"We Had to End It"	5:49
4.	"Neon Baby"	3:54
5.	"Stay for a Bit"	4:05
6.	"Lava Lamp"	5:08
7.	"Rest Easy, I'll See You Again"	3:58
8.	"Lost / Heart"	4:32
9.	"I've Left My Body and I Don't Want to Come Back"	1:30
Total length:		36:59

Cuco on Audiotree Live (2018)
No.	Title	Length
1.	"Lo Que Siento (Audiotree Live Version)"	4:14
2.	"Lava Lamp (Audiotree Live Version)"	4:57
3.	"Lover Is a Day (Audiotree Live Version)"	7:43
4.	"Summertime Hightime (Audiotree Live Version)"	2:17
5.	"Amor de Siempre (Audiotree Live Version)"	5:12
6.	"We Had to End It (Audiotree Live Version)"	5:05
Total length:		29:28

Chiquito (2018)
No.	Title	Length
1.	"Lucy" (featuring J-Kwe$t)	4:47
2.	"Dontmakemefallinlove"	3:27
3.	"Sunnyside"	4:13
4.	"Summer Time High Time" (featuring J-Kwe$t)	3:28
5.	"Mi Infinita"	4:32
6.	"CR-V"	2:27
Total length:		22:54

Hitchhiker (2023)
No.	Title	Length
1.	"Edith"	3:24
2.	"Planet Express"	4:20
3.	"Give It the World"	4:08
4.	"Mesh Camp"	3:44
5.	"Junkies and Rarities"	4:34
6.	"Messenger"	4:04
Total length:		24:14

=== Singles ===
==== As lead artist ====
Year	Title	Certifications	Album/EP
2017	"Lo Que Siento"		Non-album singles
2018	"Sunnyside"		Non-album singles
2018	"CR-V"		Chiquito
2018	"Drown" (with Clairo)		Non-album singles
2018	"Lucy" (with J-Kwe$t)		Non-album singles
2019	"Hydrocodone"		Para Mi
2019	"Bossa No Sé" (with Jean Carter)	RIAA: Gold	Para Mi
2022	"Caution"		Fantasy Gateway
2022	"Time Machine"		Fantasy Gateway
2022	"Fin Del Mundo" (with Bratty)		Fantasy Gateway
2022	"Aura"		Fantasy Gateway
2023	"Si Me Voy" (with the Marías)		Non-album singles
2025	"ICNBYH"		Ridin'
2025	"My 45" (with Jean Carter)		Ridin'
2025	"Para Ti"		Ridin'
2025	"Phases"		Ridin'

==== As featured artist ====
Year	Title	Album
2018	"So Strange" (Polyphia featuring Cuco)	New Levels New Devils
2019	"Search" (MC Magic featuring Cuco & Lil Rob)	Non-album singles
2019	"DameLove" (Girl Ultra featuring Cuco)	Non-album singles
2019	"Fix Me" (Dillon Francis featuring Cuco)	Non-album singles
2019	"777" (Lilbootycall featuring Cuco and J Kwe$t)	Jesus Said Run It Back
2019	"Take Me Before I Die" (Pouya featuring Cuco)	The South Got Something to Say
2020	"Off the Goop" (Yung Gravy featuring bbno$ and Cuco)	Baby Gravy 2
2022	"La novela" (Boy Pablo featuring Cuco)	Non-album singles
2024	"Better" (Lava La Rue featuring Cuco)	Starface

=== Bandcamp releases ===
Heavy Trip (2015)
No.	Title	Length
1.	"Go Home"	3:28
2.	"Swear on a Soul"	4:09
3.	"Could've"	3:24
4.	"Face in Space"	2:43
Total length:		13:44

=== Music videos ===
List of music videos, showing year released and directors
Year	Title	Director(s)	Ref.
2018	"Sunnyside"	Ambar Navarro	
2018	"Summertime Hightime" (featuring J-Kwe$t)	Mu$ty Boyz	
2018	"CR-V"	David Gantz & Theo Cohn	
2019	"Search" (MC Magic featuring Cuco & Lil Rob)	Ali Zamani	
2019	"Hydrocodone"	Jazmin Garcia	
2019	"Bossa No Sé" (featuring Jean Carter)	Pasqual Gutierrez	
2019	"Feelings"	Francisco Outón	
2019	"Keeping Tabs" (featuring Suscat0)	Pasqual Gutierrez & RJ Sanchez	
2021	"Paradise"	Cliqua	
2021	"Forevermore"	Cliqua	
2021	"Under the Sun"	Carlos Lopez Estrada & Jeff Desom	
2021	"Piel Canela"	Basa	
2022	"Caution"	Cole Kush	
2022	"Sitting in the Corner" (featuring Kacey Musgraves & Adriel Favela)	Dan Streit	
2022	"First of the Year"	Suscato	
2023	"Best Disaster"	Eric Foster	
2023	"Si Me Voy" (featuring the Marías)	Carlos Lopez Estrada & Jeff Desom	
