= Jinx (Crumb album) =

Studio album by Crumb
- Released: June 14, 2019
- Studios: The Rare Book Room, Black Lodge Recording
- Genres: Psychedelic pop; indie rock
- Length: 27:22
- Label: Crumb
- Producers: Gabe Wax; Crumb

Crumb chronology
Locket (2017)	Jinx (2019)	Ice Melt (2021)

Jinx is the debut studio album by American pop band Crumb, released June 14, 2019.

== Background ==
The album's titular "Jinx", about a curse which befalls the band, was inspired by a near death experience involving the band, when they were in a near fatal car accident in Montreal in 2018. After the accident, several members of the band were injured and had to perform in casts. The album was produced and released independently, and was fully funded by listeners.

== Music ==
=== Composition ===
The album blends psych pop and indie rock. Some of the album's tracks contain heavy jazz influences, including keyboard riffs and minimal production effects. It is also influenced by lo-fi music aesthetics, including synthesizers. Rebecca Hammond of STGA, said that Ramani's vocals on the album are "a mix of grunge and indie", while the instrumentation evoked the psychedelic music of the 1960s.

=== Lyrics ===
Lyrically, the album is mostly abstract with only loose storytelling. However, many of its tracks focus on anxiety, fear of the unknown, and the uncanny aspects of mundanity. Sophia Ordaz of Slant Magazine compared its disorienting atmosphere to Radiohead's OK Computer album.

== Release and reception ==
Professional ratings
Aggregate scores
Source	Rating
Metacritic	80
Review scores
Source	Rating
Clash	7/10
Paste	8/10
Pitchfork	7.8/10

On April 9, 2019, Crumb released "Nina", the lead single from Jinx, and announced the album's release in June. The music video for "Nina" was directed by Haoyan of America, and starred David Patrick Kelly.

=== Critical reception ===
The album was met with generally positive reviews. Writing for Pitchfork, Ann-Derrick Gaillot said that it "[bends] indie rock and jazz influences to shape a clear-eyed perspective tinted amber with dirt." Wilf Skinner of Clash called it "hard to dislike [...] also a tad hard to really love."

Irene Monokandilos of Consequence of Sound praised the songwriting and instrumentation on the album, while commenting that the tracks could be somewhat indistinct, saying it "toes the line between a solid piece of work from start to finish and a 10-track blur." The album's lead single "Nina" was praised for its composition and use of psych-rock influences.

The album received a nomination for Best Indie Rock Album at the 2020 Libera Awards.

== Track listing ==
All songs composed by the members of Crumb.

Jinx track listing
No.	Title	Length
1.	"Cracking"	1:51
2.	"Nina"	3:20
3.	"Ghostride"	2:06
4.	"Fall Down"	2:53
5.	"M.R"	3:37
6.	"The Letter"	2:05
7.	"Part III"	3:32
8.	"And It Never Ends"	2:53
9.	"Faces"	2:09
10.	"Jinx"	2:41

Vinyl bonus track
No.	Title	Length
11.	"Better"	2:40

== Personnel ==
- Lila Ramani – guitar, vocals
- Jesse Brotter – bass, vocals
- Bri Aronow – synthesizers, keyboard, saxophone
- Jonathan Gilad – drums
