= Hollow Ground (album) =

Studio album by Cut Worms
- Released: May 4, 2018
- Recorded: July 2016
- Studios: Dream Star Studios, Los Angeles, California; Gary's Electric Studio
- Genre: Indie pop
- Length: 38:09
- Label: Jagjaguwar
- Producers: Jason Finkel; Jonathan Rado

Cut Worms chronology
Alien Sunset (2017)	Hollow Ground (2018)	Nobody Lives Here Anymore (2020)

Hollow Ground is the debut studio album by American musician Max Clarke, under his musical project Cut Worms. It was released on May 4, 2018, by Jagjaguwar.

== Critical reception ==
Professional ratings
Aggregate scores
Source	Rating
Metacritic	80/100
Review scores
Source	Rating
AllMusic	4/5 stars
Exclaim!	8/10
MusicOMH	3.5/5 stars
Pitchfork	7.2/10

Hollow Ground was met with "generally favorable" reviews from critics. At Metacritic, which assigns a weighted average rating out of 100 to reviews from mainstream publications, this release received an average score of 80, based on 7 reviews. Aggregator Album of the Year gave the release a 76 out of 100 based on a critical consensus of 8 reviews.

Tim Sendra from AllMusic said of the album: "With producers Jonathan Rado and Jason Finkel helping out, Clarke plays most of the instruments, vocally plays the role of both Phil and Don, and masterfully straddles the line between soda shop-sweet pop and richly twangy country as Hollow Ground's mix of jangling uptempo tracks, quiet ballads loaded with lap and pedal steel, and swaying midtempo doo wop roll by like the best songs on a greatest-hits album.

== Track listing ==
Hollow Ground track listing
No.	Title	Length
1.	"How It Can Be"	3:36
2.	"Coward's Confidence"	3:36
3.	"Don't Want to Say Goodbye"	2:51
4.	"It Won't Be Too Long"	3:17
5.	"Till Tomorrow Goes Away"	4:22
6.	"Like Going Down Sideways"	5:24
7.	"Think I Might Be in Love"	4:21
8.	"Cash for Gold"	3:35
9.	"Hanging Your Picture Up to Dry"	3:05
10.	"Mad About You"	4:02

== Personnel ==
Musicians

- Max Clarke – primary artist, vocals, guitar
- David Christian – drums
- Kyle Avallone – bass
- Ron Budman – sax

Production

- Jason Finkel – mixing, producer
- Jonathan Rado – mixing, producer
- Jarvis Taveniere – mixing
