= Steelism =

American instrumental band

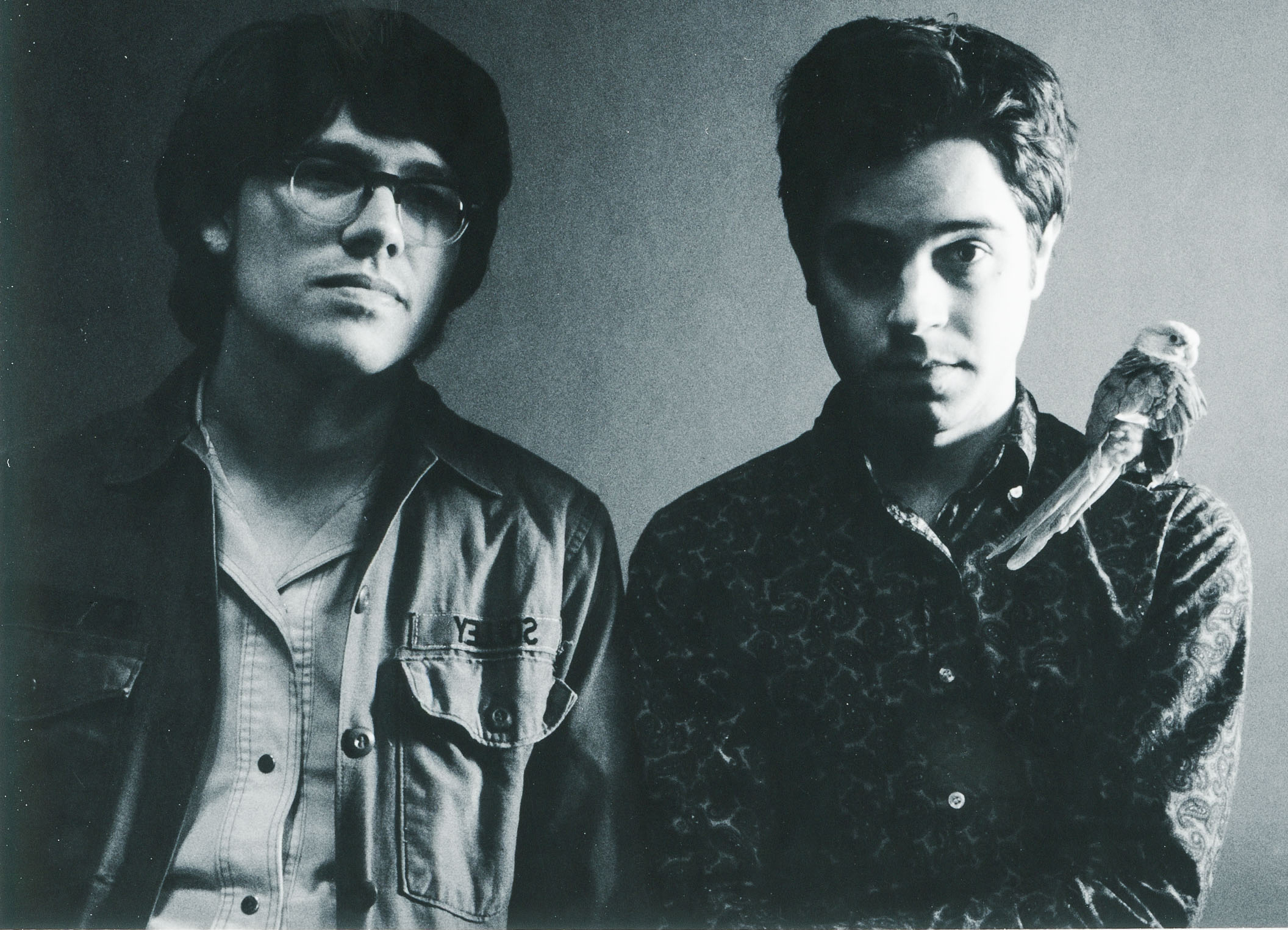

Background information
- Origin: Nashville, Tennessee, U.S.
- Genre: Instrumental
- Years active: 2011–present
- Labels: Single Lock Records, Intoxicating Sounds, Names Records, Theory 8 Records, Turbo Time Records
- Members: Jeremy Fetzer; Spencer Cullum Jr.
- Website: steelismmusic.com

Steelism is a Nashville-based instrumental band. A "country twang, jazz, blues, R&B, surf guitar, and Ennio Morricone-like movie soundtrack washed in a 21st century blend," Steelism is composed of guitarist Jeremy Fetzer and pedal steel player Spencer Cullum.

== History ==
Fetzer (from Canton, Ohio) and Cullum (from Essex, England) met while backing up singer Caitlin Rose on a UK tour. They began writing together after discovering a shared interest in classic movie soundtrack composers such as Ennio Morricone and 1960s instrumental artists including Booker T. and the M.G.s, The Ventures and Pete Drake. Their debut EP, The Intoxicating Sounds of Pedal Steel and Guitar, was released in October 2012.

In September 2014, the band released their debut full-length album, 615 to FAME, in North America on Single Lock Records. It was recorded at FAME Studios in Muscle Shoals, Alabama and at Club Roar in Nashville. The Fame Studios sessions were co-produced by Ben Tanner of the Alabama Shakes, who also played on the record.

Steelism released a limited-edition EP entitled The Drawing Room Vol. 1 in July 2015 on their own label, Intoxicating Sounds. Ism, their second album, was released in June 2017.

== Discography ==
- Ism (Album, 2017, Intoxicating Sounds)
- The Drawing Room, Volume 1 (EP, 2015, Intoxicating Sounds)
- "The Informant" / "The Spook" (Single, 2015, Turbo Time Records)
- 615 to FAME (Album, 2014, Single Lock Records)
- "China Plate" b/w "Emily", Split single with Andrew Combs (Electric Western, 2013)
- The Intoxicating Sounds of Pedal Steel & Guitar (EP, 2012, Theory 8)
- "9 to 5 Jive" / "Lewis & Clark" (Single, 2012, Theory 8)
