= Foxygen =

American indie rock duo

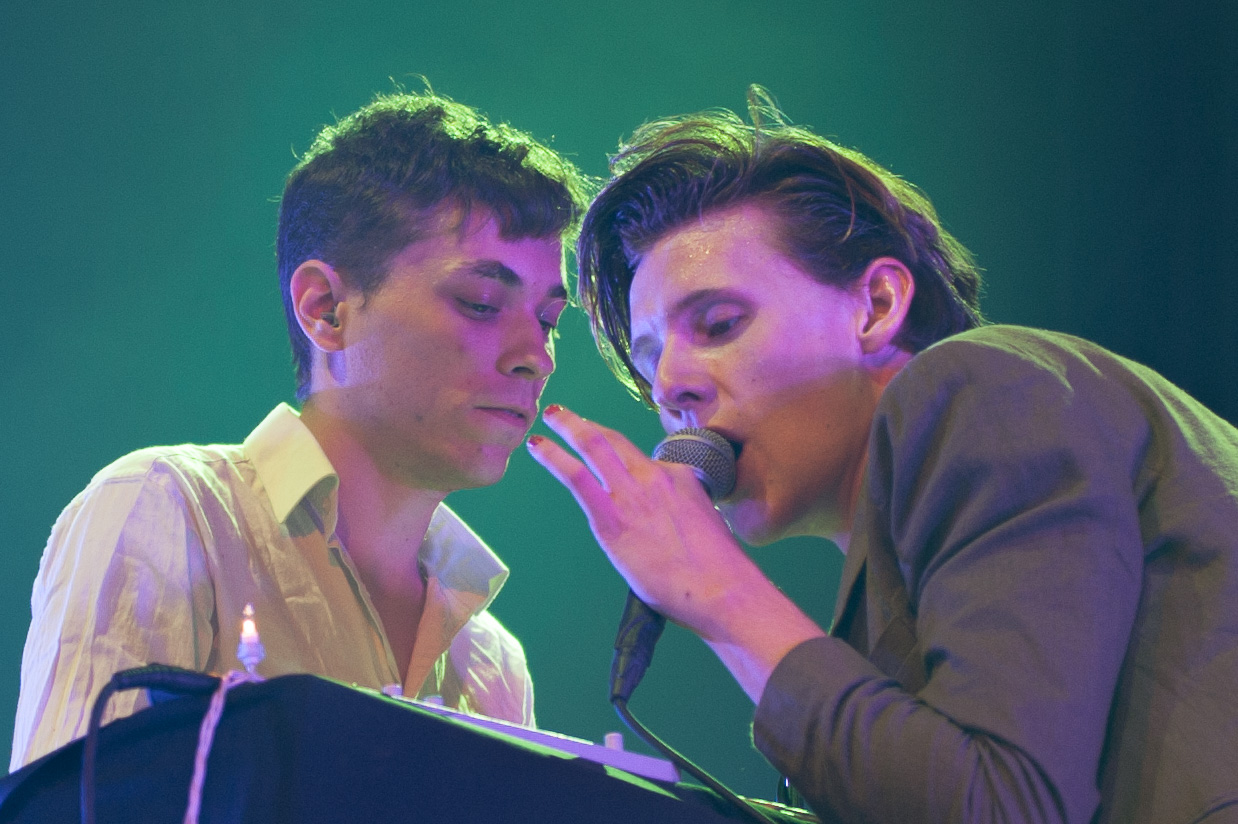
- Foxygen's Jonathan Rado (left) and Sam France (right) performing at Flow Festival in Helsinki, Finland, August 2015

Background information
- Origin: Agoura Hills, California, U.S.
- Genres: Indie rock; psychedelic rock; garage rock; baroque pop; experimental rock
- Years active: 2005–present
- Label: Jagjaguwar
- Members: Sam France; Jonathan Rado

Foxygen is an American indie rock duo from Westlake Village, California, formed in 2005. The band consists of multi-instrumentalist Jonathan Rado and vocalist Sam France. They have released six albums and a number of self-released EPs.

== History ==
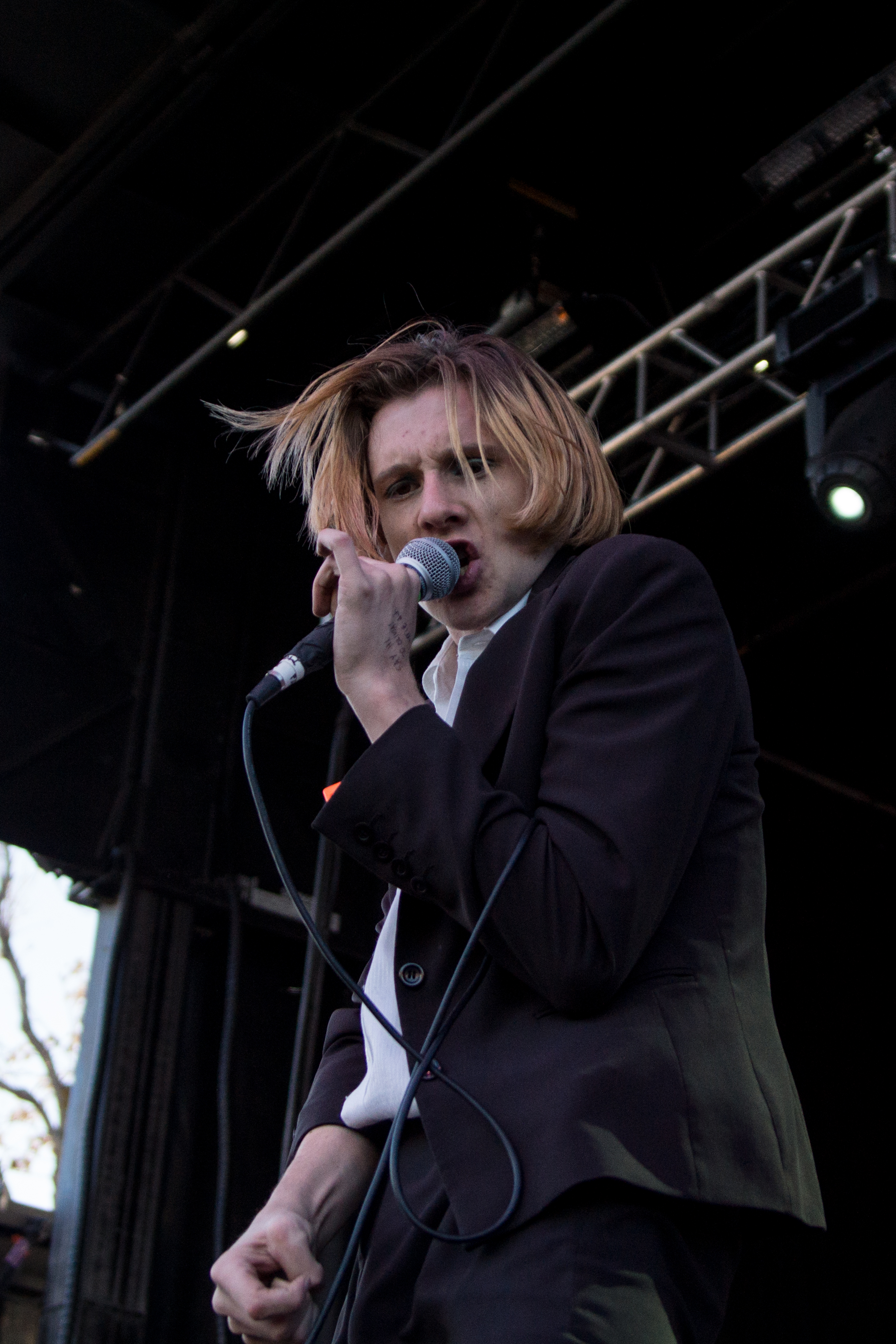
Sam France of Foxygen performing at Treefort Music Fest in March 2015

Rado and France started their band in high school when both were fourteen. After their formation in 2005, the band played experimental music; influenced by psychedelia and avant-garde. Their early music won them first place in Agoura High School's Battle of the Bands. They self-released four EPs between 2007 and 2011. In early 2011, they were 'discovered' by producer Richard Swift after handing him one of their EPs at a The Mynabirds show in New York. The group were later signed on to Jagjaguwar Records and their first studio album, Take the Kids Off Broadway, was released by Jagjaguwar on July 24, 2012.

On January 22, 2013, Jagjaguwar released Foxygen's second album, We Are the 21st Century Ambassadors of Peace & Magic. This album was produced by Richard Swift and recorded at his National Freedom studio. The record was preceded by the single "Shuggie," released on October 4, 2012. The album charted on Billboard, as did their follow-up, …And Star Power. In March 2013, Foxygen was named one of Fuse TV's 30 must-see artists at SXSW. In 2019, We Are the 21st Century Ambassadors of Peace & Magic came at no.11 on Happy Mag's list of "The 25 best psychedelic rock albums of the 2010s".

The band released their fourth LP, the theatrical Hang, on January 20, 2017, via Jagjaguwar. The album features collaborations with The Lemon Twigs, the Flaming Lips' Steven Drozd and a 40+ piece orchestra arranged by Trey Pollard and Matthew E White. The Irish Times said of the album: “Theatrical is an apt description of this collection as a whole," while noting that the album "edges perilously close to pastiche". The new album was admittedly referred to as a concept album by Sam France and Jonathan Rado themselves. The duo expressed their hope to create an album characterized by rock music mixing with the Hollywood style musical at the 30s. Allegedly, Hang is their first ever album to be recorded in a studio, prior to this their albums and songs written were all conducted at home. The duo also see the characters on the album as a continuation of their previous records.

In February 2019, they announced an April 26 release of a new album, Seeing Other People, via Jagjaguwar. The lead single is called "Livin' A Lie".

On August 30, 2022, the band suggested on their Instagram page that they had broken up. Since then, Rado has spoken about the band as still ongoing. On December 19, 2023, Foxygen performed a brief reunion show at Zebulon in Los Angeles.

On April 13, 2023, the band was featured on the song "There Is This Thing" by Reginald Chapman.

== Critical reception ==
The Entertainment Weekly staff wrote, "We just can't stop playing the scruffy psych-rock duo's Rolling Stones-obsessed album with the appropriately exuberant title We Are the 21st Century Ambassadors of Peace & Magic." In January 2013, Pitchfork cited Foxygen under "Best New Music" in their review of the new album. Their 2014 album, the Todd Rundgren-influenced ...And Star Power received decidedly mixed reviews. While Paste praised it as "indulgent, unhinged, sprawling, funny and sometimes spookily great," and Slant Magazine called it a "dense and rewarding listen," Hal Horowitz at American Songwriter called it "an occasionally interesting failed experiment."

== Discography ==
Studio albums

- Jurrassic Exxplosion Phillipic (2007)
- Take the Kids Off Broadway (2011)
- We Are the 21st Century Ambassadors of Peace & Magic (2013)
- ...And Star Power (2014)
- Hang (2017)
- Seeing Other People (2019)
