= Brandon Flowers discography =

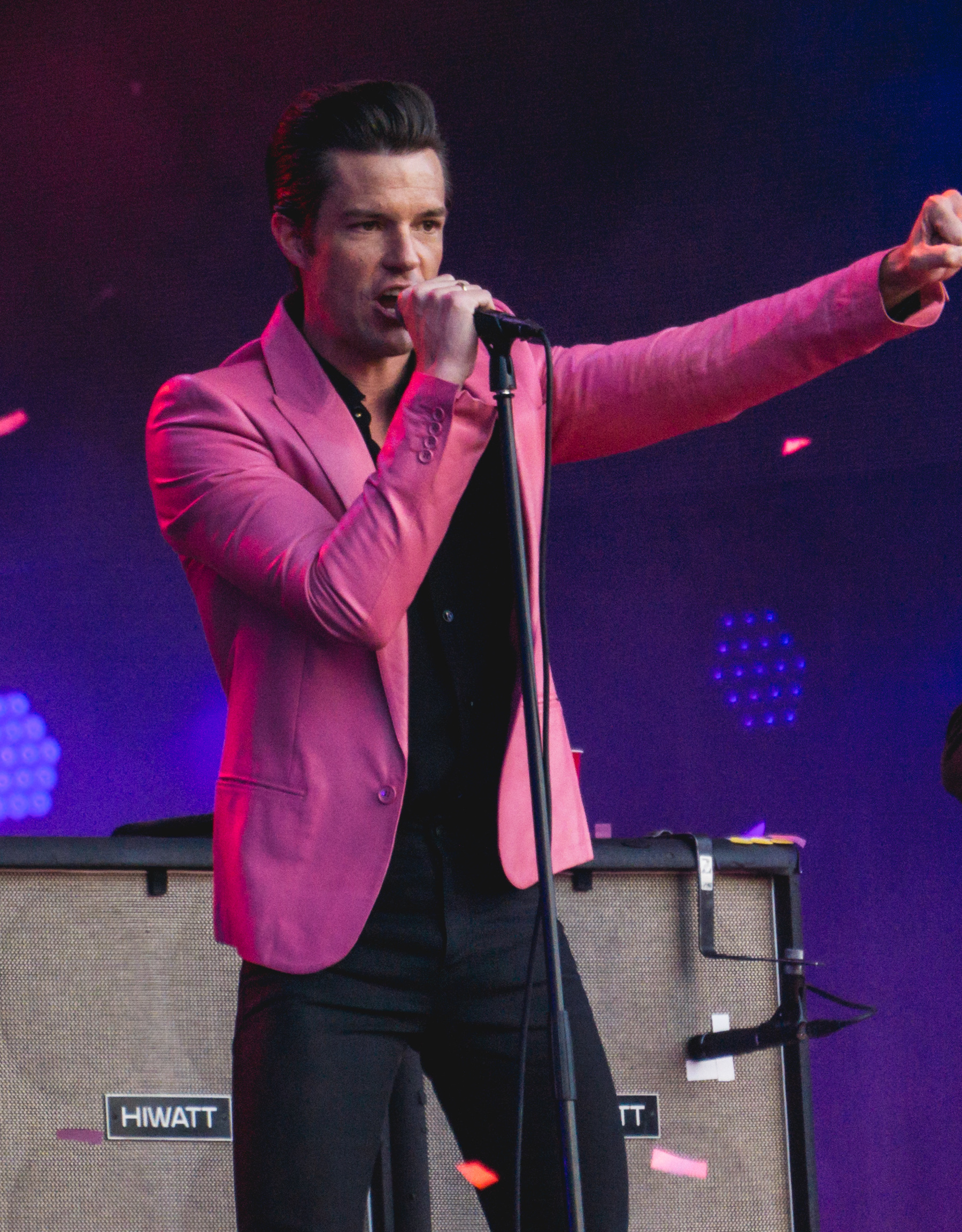
- Flowers performing in 2017
- Studio albums: 3
- Singles: 9
- Promotional singles: 1
- Music videos: 8

American singer and songwriter Brandon Flowers has released three studio albums, nine singles, one promotional single, and eight music videos. Flowers initially achieved success as frontman of the rock band the Killers, which he formed in 2001. The band has released seven studio albums, all of which topped the UK Albums Chart; they achieved early international fame with the singles "Mr. Brightside", "Somebody Told Me", and "When You Were Young", all of which entered the Billboard Hot 100.

Following the successful release of and tour for the Killers' third studio album, Day & Age (2008), the band went on hiatus. Flowers announced on social media that he would release a solo studio album entitled Flamingo (2010). Flowers released his debut solo single "Crossfire" in June 2010, which reached the top ten on the UK singles chart and was certified Silver by the British Phonographic Industry (BPI). Supported by succeeding singles "Only the Young" and "Jilted Lovers & Broken Hearts", Flamingo was released in September 2010. It debuted at number one on the UK Albums Chart and number three on the Billboard 200. The album sold 400,000 copies worldwide, and was later certified Gold in the UK.

The Killers reunited in 2011; the release of their fourth studio album, Battle Born (2012), put Flowers's solo career on hold. After the band's Battle Born World Tour ended in 2014, Flowers began to work on his second solo studio album. Preceded by singles "Can't Deny My Love", "Still Want You", "Lonely Town" and "I Can Change", The Desired Effect was released in May 2015. It debuted at number one on the UK Albums Chart and number 17 on the Billboard 200. The album sold over 100,000 copies, and was later certified Gold in the UK. Later that year, Flowers featured on the track "Superheated" from the New Order album Music Complete, which reached number two on the UK Albums Chart.

The Killers continued with three more albums after The Desired Effect: Wonderful Wonderful (2017), Imploding the Mirage (2020), and Pressure Machine (2021). Following the release of Pressure Machine, Flowers began working on more solo material, writing his third solo album to "pick up where Pressure Machine left off". The single "Plans" was Flowers' first original solo release in over a decade; it, "Paradise", and "Tiger's Blood" preceded his third solo studio album, Thrasher, which was released in August 2026.

== Studio albums ==
List of studio albums, with selected chart positions, sales figures and certifications
Title	Album details	Peak chart positions										Sales	Certifications
Title	Album details	US	US Rock	AUS	CAN	GER	IRL	NLD	NZ	SWI	UK	Sales	Certifications
Flamingo	Released: September 3, 2010; Labels: Mercury, Island, Vertigo, Universal; Formats: CD, LP, digital download	8	4	5	9	8	3	4	6	13	1	UK: 271,512; US: 137,000	BPI: Gold; IRMA: Gold
The Desired Effect	Released: May 18, 2015; Labels: Island, Virgin EMI, Universal; Formats: CD, LP digital download	17	3	14	7	37	2	16	21	36	1	UK: 100,557	BPI: Gold
Thrasher	Released: August 21, 2026; Labels: Island; Formats: CD, LP, digital download, cassette	196	—	44	—	—	33	—	—	54	3		

== Singles ==
List of singles, with selected chart positions and certifications, showing year released and album name
Title	Year	Peak chart positions										Certifications	Album
Title	Year	US Bub.	US Rock	AUS	CAN	GER	IRL	NLD	NZ	SWI	UK	Certifications	Album
"Crossfire"	2010	3	11	46	70	34	4	22	22	35	8	BPI: Silver	Flamingo
"Only the Young"	2010	—	— (Note: "Only the Young" did not enter the Rock Songs chart, but peaked at number 39 on the Rock Digital Songs chart.)	—	—	—	—	68	—	— (Note: "Only the Young" did not enter the Swiss Singles chart, but charted at number 80 on the Swiss Airplay chart.)	—		Flamingo
"Jilted Lovers & Broken Hearts"	2011	—	—	—	—	—	—	—	—	—	—		Flamingo
"Can't Deny My Love"	2015	—	30	—	—	—	—	— (Note: "Can't Deny My Love" did not enter the Netherlands' Single Top 100 but peaked on the Netherlands' Single Tip Chart at number 29.)	—	—	109		The Desired Effect
"Still Want You"	2015	—	—	—	—	—	—	—	—	—	—		The Desired Effect
"Lonely Town"	2015	—	47	—	—	—	—	—	—	—	—		The Desired Effect
"I Can Change"	2015	—	—	—	—	—	70	—	—	—	52		The Desired Effect
"Plans"	2026	—	— (Note: "Plans" did not enter the Hot Rock & Alternative Songs chart, but did peak at number 13 on the Adult Alternative Airplay chart.)	—	—	—	—	—	—	—	— (Note: "Plans" did not enter the UK Singles Chart, but peaked at number 40 on the UK Singles Sales Chart.)		Thrasher
"Paradise"	2026	—	—	—	—	—	—	—	—	—	— (Note: "Paradise" did not enter the UK Singles Chart, but peaked at number 92 on the UK Singles Sales Chart.)		Thrasher
"Tiger's Blood"	2026	—	—	—	—	—	—	—	—	—	— (Note: "Tiger's Blood" did not enter the UK Singles Chart, but peaked at number 55 on the UK Singles Sales Chart.)		Thrasher
"—" denotes a release that did not chart or was not released in that territory.

=== Promotional singles ===
List of promotional singles, showing year released and album
Title	Year	Album
"Swallow It"	2010	Flamingo

=== As featured artist ===
List of appearances as featured artist, showing year released and album
Title	Year	Album
"Superheated" (New Order featuring Brandon Flowers)	2015	Music Complete
"Got My Mind Set on You" (live)	2015	George Fest
"Handle with Care" (live) (with Dhani Harrison, Jonathan Bates, 'Weird Al' Yankovich, Britt Daniel, and Wayne Coyne)	2015	George Fest
"Runnin' Outta Luck" (Alex Cameron featuring Brandon Flowers)	2017	Forced Witness
"Instant Karma - Live"	2019	Imagine: John Lennon 75th Birthday Concert (Live)
"Don't Let Me Down - Live" (with Sheryl Crow and Chris Stapleton)	2019	Imagine: John Lennon 75th Birthday Concert (Live)
"All You Need Is Love - Live" (with Aloe Blacc, Eric Church, Sheryl Crow, John Fogerty, Peter Frampton, Juanes, Kris Kristofferson, Pat Monahan, Tom Morello, Willie Nelson, The Roots, Spoon, Chris Stapleton, Steven Tyler)	2019	Imagine: John Lennon 75th Birthday Concert (Live)
"Hymn #101 - Revisited" (Joe Pug featuring backup vocals by Brandon Flowers)	2022	Nation of Heat Revisited
"Raze the Bar" (Travis featuring vocals by Brandon Flowers and Chris Martin)	2024	L.A. Times
"Congratulations" (Robert Loud featuring Brandon Flowers)	2025	Bitter Optimist
"I'm Not in Love" (with Chrissie Hynde)	2025	Duets Special
"Love at the End of the World" (Brian Fallon featuring Brandon Flowers)	2026	Not Bad for New Jersey
"Days of the Years" (with Brandon Flowers)	2026	Felice County Fair: A Celebration of The Felice Brothers

== Additional credit(s) ==
List of additional credits, showing year released, recording artist, album and role
Title	Year	Artist	Album	Role
"The Days"	2014	Avicii, Robbie Williams	The Days / Nights EP	Co-writer, backing vocals
"Mixed Signals"	2016	Robbie Williams	The Heavy Entertainment Show	Co-writer, keyboards
"Forgiver"	2018	Juanita Stein	Until the Lights Fade	Co-writer, producer
"Easy Distraction"	2024	James Bay	Changes All the Time	Co-writer

== Music videos ==
List of music videos, showing year released and director
Title	Year	Director(s)
"Crossfire"	2010	Nash Edgerton
"Only the Young"	2010	Sophie Muller
"Can't Deny My Love"	2015	Robert Schober
"Still Want You"	2015	Warren Fu
"Lonely Town"	2015	Robert Schober
"I Can Change"	2015	Giorgio Testi
"Plans"	2026	Jared L. Christopher
"Paradise"	2026	Jared L. Christopher
"Does It Ever Cross Your Mind?"	2026	Jared L. Christopher

List of music video appearances, showing year released and recording artist
Title	Year	Artist
"Her Love Is Killin' Me" (music video)	2020	Huey Lewis and the News

== Filmography ==
=== Television ===
List of television appearances, showing year released and role
Title	Year	Role
"Jonathan & Jesus." (docuseries, S1, E1)	2024	Himself
