= The Desired Effect Tour =

2015 concert tour by Brandon Flowers

- Tour by Brandon Flowers
- Promotional poster for the tour
- Associated album: The Desired Effect
- Start date: March 12, 2015
- End date: October 2, 2015
- No. of shows: 44 in North America; 14 in Europe; 58 total

Brandon Flowers concert chronology
- Flamingo Road Tour (2010–11); The Desired Effect Tour (2015); Thrasher Tour (2026)

The Desired Effect Tour was the second solo concert tour by American singer-songwriter, Brandon Flowers, who is also frontman for the rock band the Killers. Visiting North America and Europe, the tour supported his second album, The Desired Effect, released in May 2015. The tour received praise from both spectators and critics alike, including a five star review by MTV.

== Background ==
Flowers debuted lead single "Can't Deny My Love" from The Desired Effect in Guadalajara, Mexico on March 12, 2015. Two nights later, he performed for Vive Latino 2015, live streamed across Mexico. Flowers had originally intended to first reveal the song in his hometown of Las Vegas but was forced to postpone the show.

== Personnel ==
Tour personnel as of July 27, 2015.

- Brandon Flowers – vocals
- Benji Lysaght – guitar
- Jake Blanton – vocals, guitar, keyboard, bass
- Joel Stein – guitar, keyboard
- Darren Beckett – drums
- Danielle Withers – vocals
- Erica Canales – vocals
- Matt Berman – saxophone
- Joseph Badaczewski – trumpet

== Setlist ==
This setlist is representative of the show on May 24, 2015, in Manchester. It is not intended to represent all shows from the tour.

1. Dreams Come True
2. Can't Deny My Love
3. Crossfire
4. Jilted Lovers & Broken Hearts
5. Hard Enough
6. Jenny Was a Friend of Mine (The Killers song)
7. Lonely Town
8. Diggin' Up the Heart
9. Human (The Killers song)
10. Read My Mind (The Killers song)
11. Simply Irresistible (Robert Palmer cover)
12. Don't Change (INXS cover)
13. Magdalena
14. Swallow It
15. Only the Young
16. Mr. Brightside (The Killers song) (Jacques Lu Cont Remix)
17. Runaways (The Killers song)
18. Bizarre Love Triangle (New Order cover) (with Bernard Sumner)
19. Between Me and You
20. Untangled Love
21. I Can Change

=== Encore ===
22. Still Want You
23. All These Things That I've Done (The Killers song)
24. When You Were Young (The Killers song)
25. The Way It's Always Been (Acoustic)

=== Additional notes ===
- During the concerts at the O2 Academy Brixton in London, England, Flowers performed "Don't Get Me Wrong" by The Pretenders and "Between Me and You" alongside Chrissie Hynde.
- During the concert at the Manchester Academy in Manchester, England, Flowers performed "Bizarre Love Triangle" by New Order alongside Bernard Sumner.
- During a Huey Lewis and the News concert at the Borgata Hotel in Atlantic City, Flowers performed "Do You Believe in Love" alongside Huey Lewis and the News.
- During the concert at the Usher Hall in Edinburgh, Scotland, Flowers performed a special rendition of "Only The Young" on the organ that is located within the venue.
- During the concert at House of Blues in Boston, Massachusetts, Flowers performed "Heart of Gold" by Buster Poindexter with Donald Cumming.
- During the concert at The Wiltern, Los Angeles, Flowers performed "Rent" by Pet Shop Boys and "Human" by The Killers with Neil Tennant.
- 6 shows (Charlotte, Raleigh, Norfolk, Atlanta, Orlando, and Miami) of the second North American leg were canceled due what was described at the time as unforeseen circumstances. Flowers later revealed during the Wonderful Wonderful World Tour that he rushed home to be with his wife who was experiencing suicidal thoughts.

== Tour dates ==
Date	City	Country	Venue	Opening act(s)
North America I
March 12, 2015	Guadalajara	Mexico	Teatro Estudio Cavaret	Donald Cumming
March 14, 2015	Mexico City	Mexico	Vive Latino 2015	Donald Cumming
March 21, 2015	Las Vegas	United States	The Bunkhouse Saloon	Donald Cumming
March 24, 2015	New York City	United States	Webster Hall	Donald Cumming
April 14, 2015	West Hollywood	United States	Troubadour	Donald Cumming
April 16, 2015	San Francisco	United States	Rickshaw Stop	Donald Cumming
April 21, 2015	New York City	United States	Tribeca Film Festival (Sinatra at 100)	Donald Cumming
Europe I
May 19, 2015	Dublin	Ireland	Olympia Theatre	Joywave, Joe Pug
May 21, 2015	London	England	O_{2} Academy Brixton	Joywave, Joe Pug
May 22, 2015 ^{[A]}	London	England	O_{2} Academy Brixton	Joywave, Joe Pug
May 24, 2015	Manchester	England	Manchester Academy	Joywave, Joe Pug
May 25, 2015	Edinburgh	Scotland	Usher Hall	Joywave, Joe Pug
May 26, 2015	Leeds	England	O_{2} Academy Leeds	Joywave, Joe Pug
May 28, 2015	Birmingham	England	O_{2} Academy Birmingham	Joywave, Joe Pug
May 29, 2015	Paris	France	Le Trianon Hall	Joywave, Joe Pug
May 31, 2015	Berlin	Germany	Huxleys Neue Welt	Joywave, Joe Pug
June 1, 2015	Amsterdam	Netherlands	Paradiso	Joywave, Joe Pug
June 2, 2015	Brussels	Belgium	Ancienne Belgique	Joywave, Joe Pug
June 3, 2015	Cologne	Germany	E-Werk	Joywave, Joe Pug
June 5, 2015	Milan	Italy	Fabrique	Joywave, Joe Pug
June 7, 2015	Stockholm	Sweden	Debaser Medis	Joywave, Joe Pug
North America II
June 15, 2015	Chicago	United States	Wrigley Field Captain Morgan Club	Rey Pila
July 25, 2015	Detroit	United States	Mo Pop Festival	Rey Pila
July 26, 2015	Oro-Medonte	Canada	WayHome Music & Arts Festival	Rey Pila
July 27, 2015	Pittsburgh	United States	Mr. Smalls Theatre	Rey Pila
July 29, 2015	Washington, D.C.	United States	Echostage	Rey Pila
July 30, 2015	Philadelphia	United States	Electric Factory	Rey Pila
July 31, 2015	Cleveland	United States	House of Blues	Rey Pila
August 3, 2015	Boston	United States	House of Blues	Rey Pila
August 4, 2015	New York City	United States	Terminal 5	Rey Pila
August 7, 2015	Squamish	Canada	Squamish Valley Music Festival	Rey Pila
August 9, 2015	Milwaukee	United States	The Rave / Eagles Club	Rey Pila
August 10, 2015	Columbus	United States	Newport Music Hall	Rey Pila
August 11, 2015	Richmond	United States	The National	Rey Pila
August 13, 2015	Charlotte (canceled)	United States	The Fillmore Charlotte	Rey Pila
August 14, 2015	Raleigh (canceled)	United States	The Ritz	Rey Pila
August 15, 2015	Norfolk (canceled)	United States	NorVa	Rey Pila
August 17, 2015	Atlanta (canceled)	United States	The Tabernacle	Rey Pila
August 18, 2015	Orlando (canceled)	United States	Beacham Theatre	Rey Pila
August 19, 2015	Miami Beach (canceled)	United States	The Fillmore Miami Beach	Rey Pila
North America III
August 29, 2015	Monterrey	Mexico	Hellow Festival	Rey Pila
September 2, 2015	Oakland	United States	Fox Oakland Theatre	Rey Pila
September 3, 2015	Portland	United States	Roseland Theater	Rey Pila
September 5, 2015	Edmonton	Canada	Sonic Boom Alternative Music Festival	Rey Pila
September 6, 2015	Calgary	Canada	X-Fest Alternative Music Festival	Rey Pila
September 7, 2015	Seattle	United States	Bumbershoot Festival	Rey Pila
September 10, 2015	Minneapolis	United States	First Avenue	Rey Pila
September 11, 2015	Chicago	United States	Riviera Theatre	Rey Pila
September 12, 2015	St. Louis	United States	LouFest	Rey Pila
September 13, 2015	St. Louis	United States	LouFest	Rey Pila
September 24, 2015	Phoenix	United States	Crescent Ballroom	Rey Pila
September 24, 2015	Tempe	United States	Summer Ends Music Festival	Rey Pila
September 25, 2015	Las Vegas	United States	Life Is Beautiful Festival	Rey Pila
September 27, 2015	Las Vegas	United States	Life Is Beautiful Festival	Rey Pila
September 26, 2015	Los Angeles	United States	The Wiltern	Rey Pila
September 28, 2015	Salt Lake City	United States	The Complex	Rey Pila
September 30, 2015	Albuquerque	United States	Sunshine Theater	Rey Pila
October 1, 2015	El Paso	United States	Tricky Falls	Rey Pila
October 2, 2015	Austin	United States	Austin City Limits Music Festival	Rey Pila
Europe II
November 16, 2015	London	England	O2 Shepherd's Bush Empire	

Additionally, Brandon Flowers performed at the Royal Variety Performance at Royal Albert Hall on November 13, 2015 and at Lollapalooza Argentina & Chile on March 19 and 20, 2016, respectively.
