= Thrasher Tour =

2026 concert tour by Brandon Flowers

- Tour by Brandon Flowers
- Promotional poster for the tour
- Location: Europe; North America
- Associated album: Thrasher
- Start date: August 28, 2026
- End date: October 27, 2026
- Legs: 2
- No. of shows: 30
- Supporting acts: Erica Canales; Jess Williamson; Me Nd Adam

Brandon Flowers concert chronology
- The Desired Effect Tour (2015); Thrasher Tour (2026)

The Thrasher Tour was the third solo concert tour by American singer-songwriter, Brandon Flowers, frontman of the rock band the Killers, in support of his third solo studio album, Thrasher (2026). The tour began on August 28, 2026, at The State Room in Salt Lake City, United States, and concluded on October 27 at the 3Olympia Theatre in Dublin, Ireland. The tour marked Flowers' first solo concert tour since The Desired Effect Tour throughout 2015, and his second appearance at Austin City Limits Music Festival as a solo artist. The tour consisted entirely of dates in the United States, Canada, Great Britain, and Ireland.

The set list for the tour consisted mainly of material from Thrasher, but additionally contained songs from Flowers' first two solo albums: Flamingo (2010) and The Desired Effect (2015), as well as material from the Killers discography, primarily songs from Pressure Machine (2021). The tour was met with positive reception, with critics praising Flowers' incoporation of storytelling and intimacy.

== Background ==
Flowers announced his third solo studio album, Thrasher, on June 23, 2026. The next day, Flowers announced an initial 17-date North American tour, including a performance at Austin City Limits Music Festival, followed by a 9-date run of the United Kingdom and Ireland in support of the album. The North American pre-sale began on June 25 at 10 am, while general sale began the next day at the same time. UK and Ireland fans who pre-ordered the album were given pre-sale access on July 1 at 10 am, with general sale commencing on July 3 at the same time. Among these dates was an October 15 performance at Royal Albert Hall in London, Flowers' first full performance at the venue since the recording of Live from the Royal Albert Hall on the Day & Age World Tour in 2009. The tour was announced with no opening act.

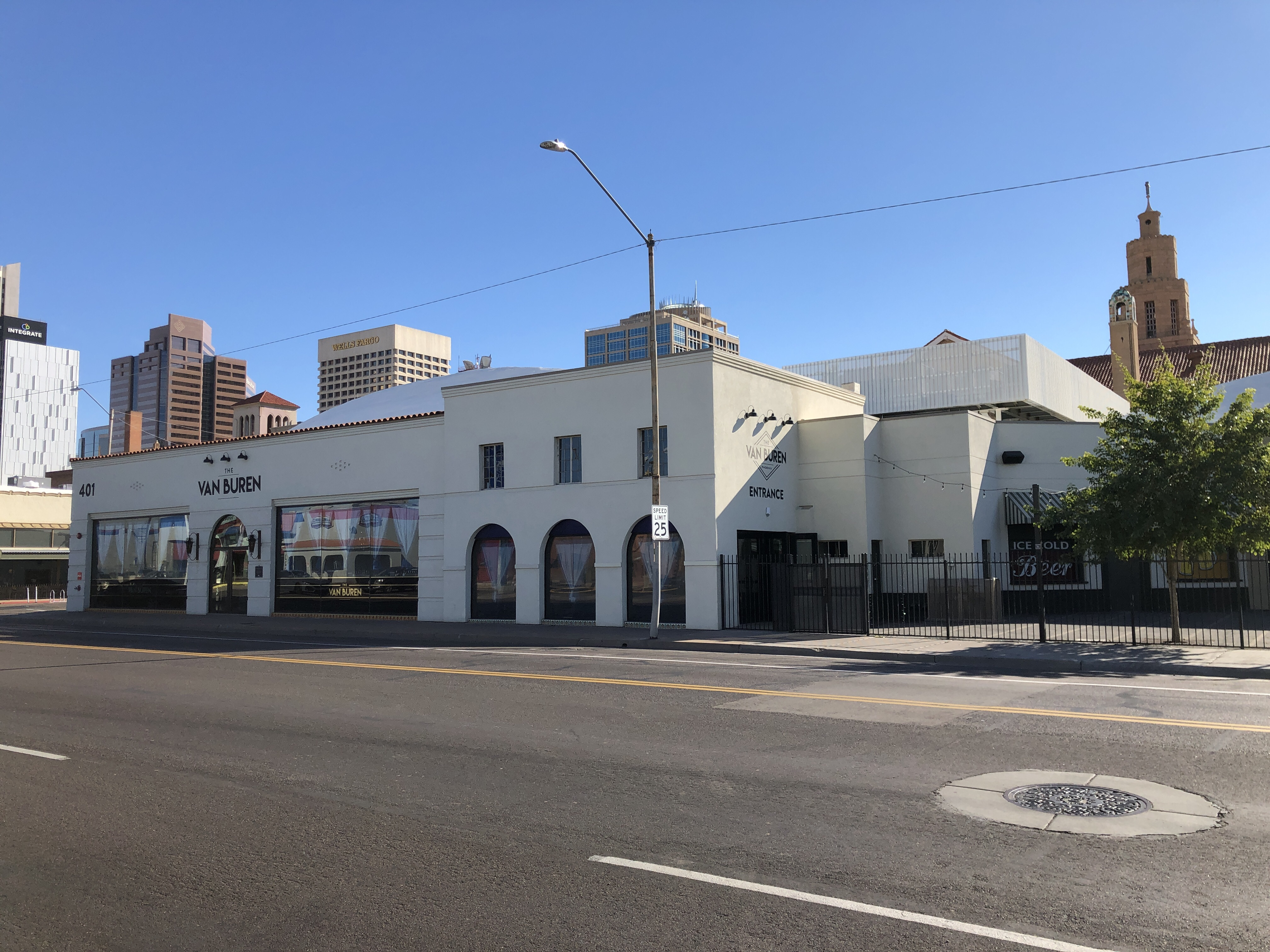
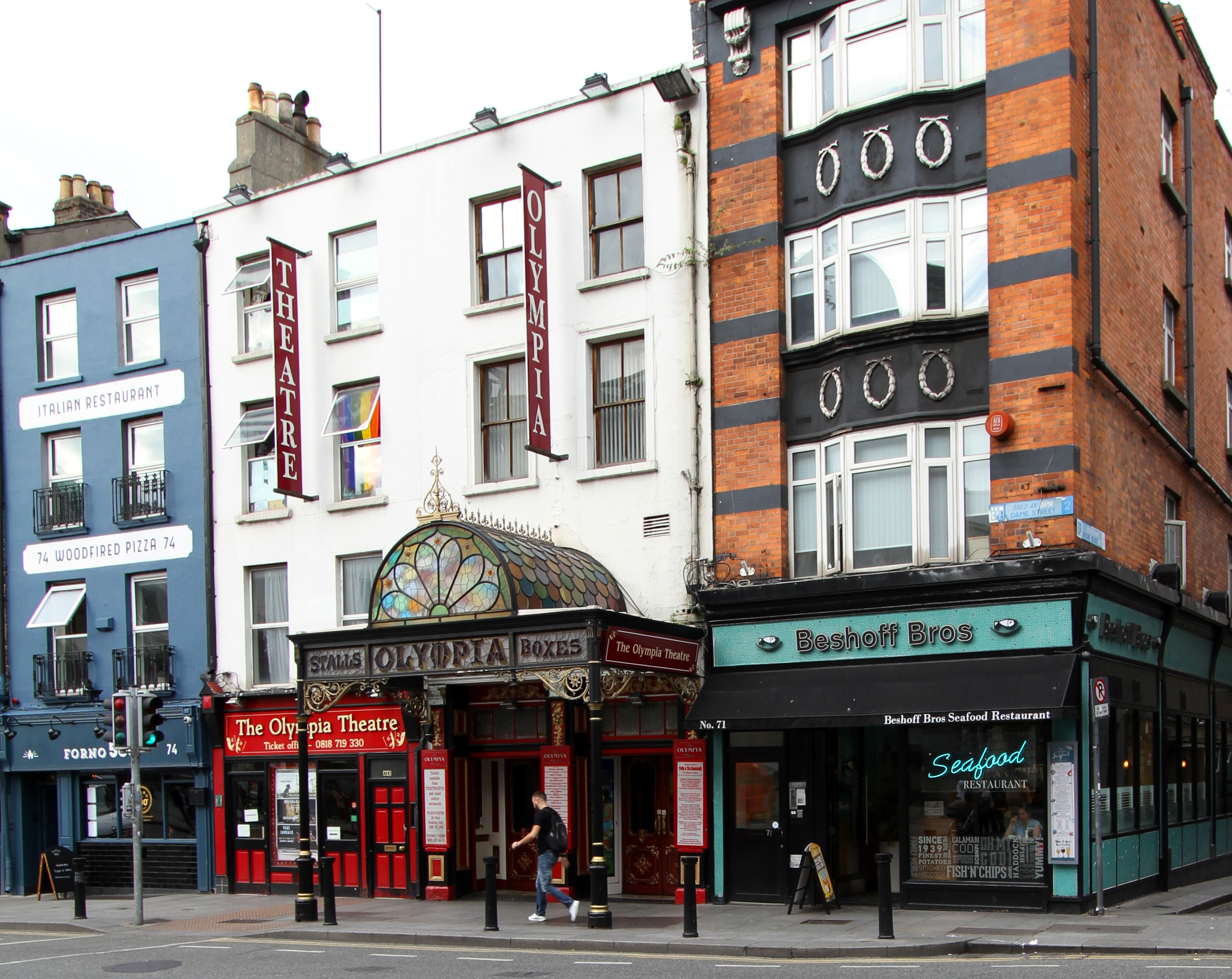
The Van Buren (left) and the 3Olympia Theatre (right), where the Thrasher Tour proper began and concluded, respectively.

Tickets for the tour sold out in a matter of minutes. A second Las Vegas date at the Encore Theater in the Wynn set for October 5 was added on June 25 due to "overwhelming fan demand". Flowers announced two warm-up dates on August 6, slated for August 28 and 29 at The State Room in Salt Lake City, a venue with a capacity of 299. Flowers' backing vocalist Erica Canales was added as an opening act to five dates through the Northeast United States, performing "covers of classic '90s country songs" in a brief solo set. On August 19, following a crossword posted on social media by Live Nation Austin, Flowers was revealed to be participating in "ACL Fest Nights", with a show set for October 1 at Stubb's Waller Creek Amphiteater announced. The show, which saw Jess Williamson and Me Nd Adam opening, switched venues to the Moody Theater on September 30 over "potential weather concerns". Me Nd Adam later opened for Flowers on his October 5 and 6 dates at the Encore Theater in the Wynn. The Thrasher Tour began on August 28, 2026, at The State Room in Salt Lake City and concluded on October 27 at the 3Olympia Theatre in Dublin.

== Concert synopsis ==
The main, Thrasher-heavy setlist, consisting of eight songs from the album, was performed at most shows and followed the same structure. The A-setlist began with the 35 second mariachi intro to "The Red Ground", during which Flowers and his backing band entered the stage. Afterwards, Flowers finished the song and launched into "Does It Ever Cross Your Mind?". "Crossfire" was performed next, followed by the three singles from Thrasher: "Tiger's Blood", "Plans", and "Paradise". "Still Want You", "Angel" and "Magdalena" all followed in quick succession, with "Miss America", "In the Car Outside" from the Killers' Pressure Machine (2021), and "Hard Enough" coming directly after. For the next song, Flowers opted for a cover, with songs such as "Forever and Ever, Amen" by Randy Travis being performed in five cities, "Don't Look Back in Anger" by Oasis in Salt Lake City on September 11, and "People Who Died" by the Jim Carroll Band in three cities. The Desired Effect's "Lonely Town" and "Can't Deny My Love" came after, followed by "Only the Young" closing the main setlist, seeing Flowers and his band exiting the stage. After a short break, Flowers returned to the stage with the Killers' "In Another Life" from Pressure Machine, which was replaced with "Quiet Town" in the second half of the North American leg. "Read My Mind" and "Between Me and You" followed, with an extended version of "An American Dream" closing out the show, with Flowers introducing his band, then exiting the stage.

Flowers performing "Tiger's Blood" as this show's third number.

A second, more varied setlist, was performed at The State Room on August 29, Fox Oakland Theatre on September 5, and Ogden Theatre on September 12. The B-setlist began with Roy Rogers' rendition of "Tumbling Tumbleweeds" playing from tape. As the song ended, Flowers' backing band entered the stage and began to perform "Does It Ever Cross Your Mind?". Following an introducution by bassist Jake Blanton, Flowers entered the stage and began to sing. The Killers' "Quiet Town" was performed next, with a short introduction segueing into "Paradise". The Desired Effect's "Still Want You" and "Between Me and You" followed next, then launched into "Tiger's Blood". Flowers followed with performances of the Killers' "Read My Mind" and "When You Were Young", and then transitioned to a cover of "Tell Me", a song written by Flowers' great-grandmother Dixie Bryant that was made popular by country musician Slim Whitman in 1956. The show continued with "Pressure Machine" from the album of the same name, an introduction to "One of Us" from Thrasher where Flowers detailed the story of his brother-in-law's sudden passing, and "From Here on Out" from the Killers' Battle Born (2012). The Killers' "Cody" and Flowers' "Diggin' Up the Heart" came next, with a monologue preceding "In a Heartbeat" following shortly after. "The Clock Was Tickin'" from the deluxe edition of Flowers' Flamingo (2010) closed out the main set, with the band and Flowers exiting the stage. Following a brief intermission, Flowers returned to the stage to play "Lonely Town" and "Plans", before launching into "Crossfire". "An American Dream" closed out the show, seeing Flowers introducing his band, then stepping off the stage.

For the tour's final show in Dublin on October 27, alongside the rare performance of "The Clock Was Tickin'" as well as "Running Out of Time" by and featuring Alex Cameron in the main set, Flowers performed a special extended encore of Killers' songs. The encore included "Read My Mind", "Human", "Mr. Brightside", and "All These Things That I've Done", as well as "In Another Life" and "People Who Died" by the Jim Caroll Band, before Flowers closed the show with "An American Dream". The tour additionally saw Flowers debut songs from his upcoming fourth studio album. "A Good Man is Hard to Find" (whose name is taken from the 1953 short story of the same name) was debuted live at the Bristol Beacon on October 17, while "Diamonds on Black Velvet" was debuted live at the O_{2} Apollo Manchester on October 20.

== Critical reception ==
Marquee announcing a concert at the Fox Oakland Theatre.

Deseret News attended the show at the Red Butte Garden in Salt Lake City, praising Flowers for his "theatrical voice and high-energy stage presence". Calling the show "a Killers arena show — minus the confetti and pyrotechnics", Deseret News remarked that based on his spirit, Flowers has embraced his dad's "country greats like Merle Haggard, Waylon Jennings and Willie Nelson". SoundcheckSF complimented the show at the Ford in Los Angeles, commenting on the "stories between songs, which made it personal and fun, plus a little bit earnest and wholesome", additionally remarking that Flowers' "selection of tracks through projects and bands fit pretty seamlessly together and gave everybody in the crowd something to love".

Boston University radio station WTBU reviewed the show at the Roadrunner in Boston, complimenting Flowers' backing "band [that] together gave the songs much more depth, blending the songs in a way that felt like a singular performance," while also noting Flowers' "anecdotes about each one he played and how they reflected a part of his life growing up". StagedHaze praised Flowers' show at the Riviera Theatre in Chicago, remarking that the singer knows "how to make every song he sings feel anthemic" from his touring with the Killers, complimenting Flowers' as "the same impressive showman that he’s been for more than 20 years [and] one that’s fully assured that he’s able to take his career in any direction that he wants."

== Set list ==
This set list of representative of the show on September 11, 2026 in Salt Lake City. It is not intended to represent all shows from the tour.

1. "The Red Ground"
2. "Does It Ever Cross Your Mind?"
3. "Crossfire"
4. "Tiger's Blood"
5. "Plans"
6. "Paradise"
7. "Still Want You"
8. "Angel"
9. "Magdalena"
10. "Miss America"
11. "In the Car Outside" (The Killers cover)
12. "Hard Enough"
13. "Don't Look Back in Anger" (Oasis cover)
14. "Mr. Brightside" (The Killers cover)
15. "Lonely Town"
16. "Can't Deny My Love"
17. "Only the Young"

=== Encore ===
17. "In Another Life" (The Killers cover)
18. "Read My Mind" (The Killers cover)
19. "An American Dream"

== Shows ==
List of 2026 concerts, showing date, city, country, venue, and opening act
Date (2026)	City	Country	Venue	Opening act
Warm-up Dates
August 28	Salt Lake City	United States	The State Room	—N/a
August 29	Salt Lake City	United States	The State Room	—N/a
North America
September 1	Phoenix	United States	The Van Buren	—N/a
September 4	Los Angeles	United States	The Ford	—N/a
September 5	Oakland	United States	Fox Theater	—N/a
September 7	Portland	United States	Roseland Theater	—N/a
September 8	Vancouver	Canada	Vogue Theatre	—N/a
September 9	Seattle	United States	The Showbox	—N/a
September 11	Salt Lake City	United States	Red Butte Garden	—N/a
September 12	Denver	United States	Ogden Theatre	—N/a
September 15	St. Paul	United States	Palace Theatre	—N/a
September 16	Chicago	United States	Riviera Theatre	—N/a
September 18	Brooklyn	United States	Brooklyn Paramount	Erica Canales
September 20	Washington, D.C.	United States	9:30 Club	Erica Canales
September 21	Philadelphia	United States	Franklin Music Hall	Erica Canales
September 23	Boston	United States	Roadrunner	Erica Canales
September 24	Toronto	Canada	History	Erica Canales
October 1 (Note: The concert was a part of "Official 2026 ACL Nights".)	Austin	United States	Moody Theater (Note: Originially scheduled to take place at Stubb's Waller Creek Amphitheater, but switched to the Moody Theater due to weather concerns.)	Jess Williamson Me Nd Adam
October 2 (Note: The concert was a part of "Austin City Limits 2026".)	Austin	United States	Zilker Park	—N/a
October 5	Las Vegas	United States	Encore Theater	Me Nd Adam
October 6	Las Vegas	United States	Encore Theater	Me Nd Adam
Europe				
October 14	Bournemouth	England	O_{2} Academy Bournemouth	—N/a
October 15	London	England	Royal Albert Hall	—N/a
October 17	Bristol	England	Bristol Beacon	—N/a
October 18	Nottingham	England	Rock City	—N/a
October 20	Manchester	England	O_{2} Apollo Manchester	—N/a
October 21	York	England	Barbican	—N/a
October 23	Glasgow	Scotland	O_{2} Academy Glasgow	—N/a
October 24	Birmingham	England	O_{2} Academy Birmingham	—N/a
October 27	Dublin	Ireland	3Olympia Theatre	—N/a

== Personnel ==
Credits adapted from Broken Record and JamBase.

- Brandon Flowers – vocals
- Robbie Connolly – guitar
- Jake Blanton – bass
- Glenn Moule – drums
- Brady Henry – pedal steel guitar
- Erica Canales – backing vocals
- Nicky Egan – backing vocals
