= Windfall =

Windfall or Windfalls may refer to:

== Arts and media ==
=== Film and television ===
- Windfall (1935 film), adaptation of R. C. Sherriff's 1933 play, directed by Frederick Hayward and George King
- Windfall (1955 film), a British comedy film by John Gilling and directed by Henry Cass
- Windfall, a 2003 film directed by Gerry Lively
- Windfall (2010 film), documentary on wind power directed by Laura Israel
- Windfall (2022 film), an American thriller film starring Jason Segel, Lily Collins, and Jesse Plemons
- Windfall (TV series), a drama about the recipients of a huge lottery win
- Windfall Films, a UK production company of documentaries, now part of the Argonon group
- Windfalls, an English animated television series created, written, and directed by Jenny Kenna
- "Windfall" (Press Gang), a 1993 television episode

=== Music ===
- Windfall (Rick Nelson album)
- Windfall (Joe Pug album)
- "Windfall", a song by Dead Can Dance from the album Within the Realm of a Dying Sun
- "Windfall", a song by Son Volt from the album Trace
- Windfall Records
- "Windfall", a composition by Netty Simons
- "Windfall", a composition by TheFatRat

=== Other arts ===
- Windfall (novel), by Desmond Bagley
- Windfall, a 1933 play by R. C. Sherriff
- Windfall (sculpture), an abstract artwork by Robert Murray
- Windfall: The Oil Crisis Game, a business simulation game for the Apple II
- Windfall Island, a location in the video game The Legend of Zelda: The Wind Waker
- Windfall (comics), a fictional character from DC Comics

== Places ==
- Windfall, Alberta, Canada, a locality
- Windfall, Indiana, United States, a town

== Other uses ==
- Windfall gain, the unexpected receipt of something of high value
- Windfall II, a racehorse
- Windfall, also known as a Windthrow. In forestry, windthrow refers to trees uprooted by wind.
