= Messenger (Joe Pug album) =

Studio album by Joe Pug
- Released: 2010
- Genres: Folk, Acoustic
- Label: Lightning Rod Records

Joe Pug chronology
In the Meantime (2010)	Messenger (2010)	Live at Lincoln Hall (2011)

Professional ratings
Review scores
Source	Rating
Paste	9.1/10

Messenger is Joe Pug's first full-length album.

In contrast to Pug's first EP, Nation of Heat, a full backing band supplements Pug's guitar, vocals and harmonica, a change featured most notably on an electric version of Nation of Heat's "Speak Plainly, Diana." Reviewers, like Steve Kolowich at the Washington City Paper, noted that, with Messenger, in contrast to Nation of Heat, Pug turns from declarative and extroverted to reflective and introspective:

His lyrics are less declarative, and sometimes quake with doubt: “Not So Sure” is a penitent ode to epistemology. “Unsophisticated Heart” is an admission of immaturity that literally ends with a whimper. “Disguised as Someone Else” is a fantasy in which the singer disavows his identity to hide from his regret. On the last record, Pug shouted, “I have done wrong, I will do wrong, there’s nothing wrong with doing wrong!” Here, he seems to tack on a meek amendment: “These days, I’m not so sure.”

The album met critical acclaim, with Paste Magazine rating it 9.1/10, adding: “unless your surname is Dylan, Waits, Ritter or Prine, you could face-palm yourself to death trying to pen songs half as inspired as the 10 tracks on Joe Pug’s debut full-length.”

== Track listing ==
1. "Messenger" – 4:23
2. "How Good You Are" – 4:19
3. "Not So Sure" – 4:35
4. "The Sharpest Crown" – 3:58
5. "The Door Was Always Open" – 2:49
6. "The First Time I Saw You" – 3:34
7. "Unsophisticated Heart" – 3:06
8. "Disguised as Someone Else" – 3:34
9. "Bury Me Far (From My Uniform)" – 4:07
10. "Speak Plainly, Diana" – 3:17

== Personnel ==
- Joe Pug - Guitar, Vocals
- Tim Bennett - Drums, Percussion
- Curtis Evans - Vocal Harmony
- Julia Klee - Vocal Harmony
- Rocco Labriola - Banjo, Pedal Steel Guitar
- Jeremy Miller - Vocal Harmony
- Matt Scheussler - Guitar (Bass)
- Darren Spitzer - Vocal Harmony
- Ian Tsan - Drums, Vocal Harmony
