= I Can Change =

I Can Change may refer to:

- "I Can Change" (Brandon Flowers song)
- "I Can Change" (LCD Soundsystem song)
- "I Can Change", a song from the South Park: Bigger, Longer & Uncut soundtrack
