= List of awards and nominations received by Brandon Flowers =

Brandon Flowers awards and nominations
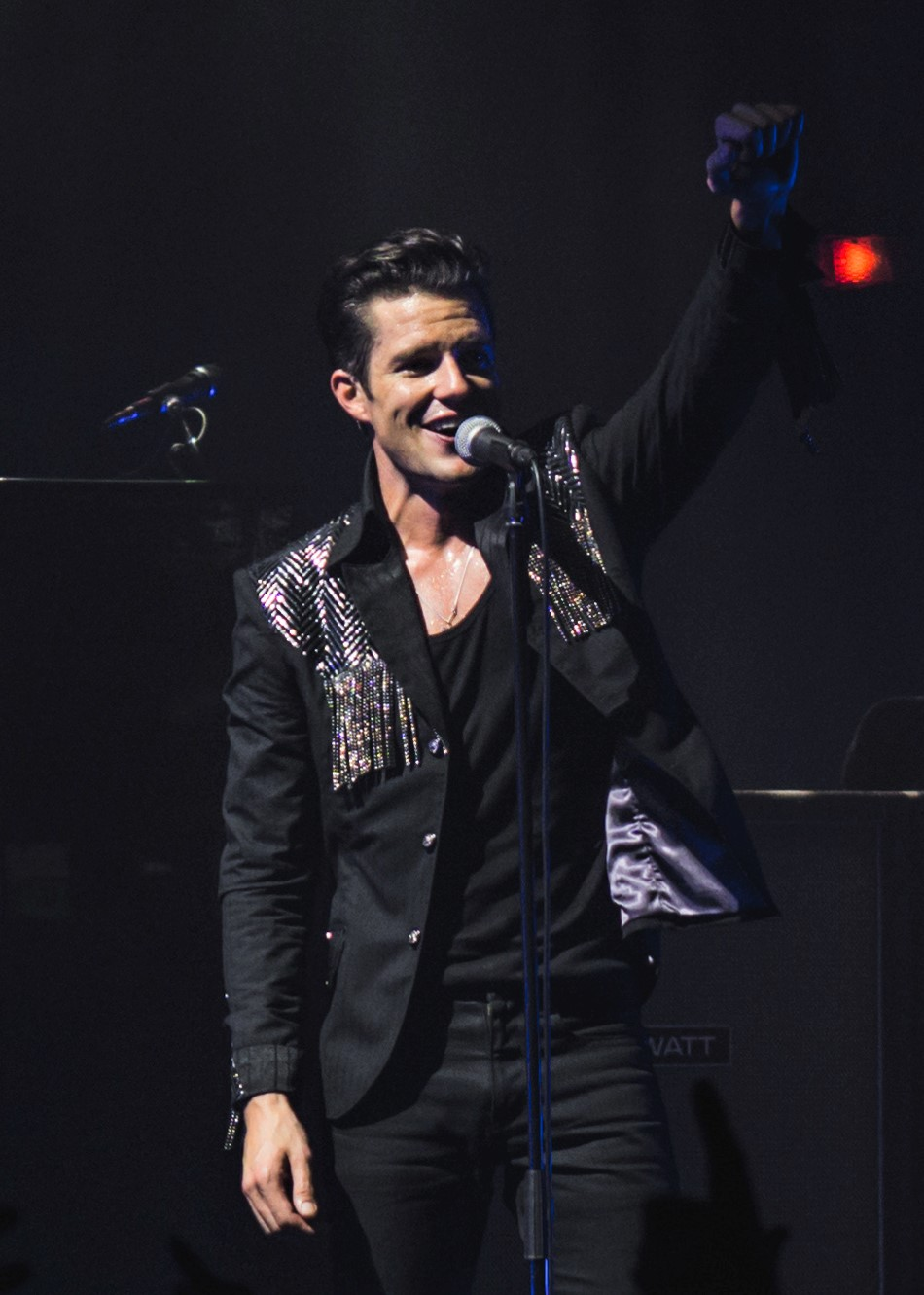
- Flowers performing in 2017
Awards and nominations
Award	Wins	Nominations
AltRock Awards	0	1
AML Awards	1	1
GQ Awards	1	1
Ivor Novello Awards	1	1
NME Awards	3	10
Q Awards	1	2

Totals (Note: Certain award groups do not simply award one winner. They acknowledge several different recipients, have runners-up, and have third place. Since this is a specific recognition and is different from losing an award, runner-up mentions are considered wins in this award tally. For simplification and to avoid errors, each award in this list has been presumed to have had a prior nomination.)
- Wins: 7
- Nominations: 16

The American singer-songwriter Brandon Flowers has received several accolades during his career, including one Q Award, three NME Awards, and an Ivor Novello Award. First rising to prominence as the frontman of the rock group the Killers, Flowers has released seven studio albums with the band since 2002. He has garnered ten NME Awards nominations, winning Sexiest Man and Best Dressed Man in 2005, and Most Stylish in 2011. His songwriting also earned him a Special International Award at the 2025 Ivor Novello Awards, where Flowers was presented the award by Bruce Springsteen.

In addition to his work with the Killers, Flowers launched a successful solo career with the release of his debut single "Crossfire" in 2010, which earned Flowers a nomination for Best Video at the 2011 NME Awards. Flowers followed with his debut solo studio album, Flamingo (2010), which sold more than 400,000 copies and topped the UK Albums chart. His follow-up solo album, The Desired Effect (2015), sold over 100,000 copies and earned Flowers an AML Award for Lyrics in 2015.

== Awards and nominations ==
List of award nominations, with the year of ceremony, nominee or work, category, and result
Award	Year	Nominee/Work	Category	Result	Ref.
AltRock Awards	2018	Brandon Flowers	Best Male Singer	Nominated	
AML Awards	2015	The Desired Effect	AML Award for Lyrics	Won	
GQ Men of the Year Awards	2008	Brandon Flowers	Most Stylish Man of the Year	Won	
Ivor Novello Awards	2025	Brandon Flowers	Special International Award	Won	
NME Awards	2005	Brandon Flowers	Sexiest Man	Won	
NME Awards	2005	Brandon Flowers	Best Dressed	Won	
NME Awards	2006	Brandon Flowers	Best Dressed	Nominated	
NME Awards	2007	Brandon Flowers	Sexiest Man	Nominated	
NME Awards	2007	Brandon Flowers	Best Dressed	Nominated	
NME Awards	2009	Brandon Flowers	Best Dressed	Nominated	
NME Awards	2009	Brandon Flowers	Worst Dressed	Nominated	
NME Awards	2009	Brandon Flowers	Hero of the Year	Nominated	
NME Awards	2011	Brandon Flowers	Most Stylish	Won	
NME Awards	2011	"Crossfire"	Best Video	Nominated	
Q Awards	2010	Brandon Flowers	Best Male Artist	Nominated	
Q Awards	2012	Brandon Flowers	Q Idol Award	Won	

== Listicles ==
Publisher	Year	Accolade	Rank	Ref.
Esquire	2011	50 Most Stylish Musicians of the Last 50 Years	—	
Xfm	2012	XFM's Greatest Frontmen of All Time	6	
VH1	2013	VH1's 100 Sexiest Artists	57	
Uproxx	2022	The Best Lead Singers, Ranked	54	

== See also ==
- List of awards and nominations received by the Killers
