= Brandon Flowers =

American musician and songwriter (born 1981)

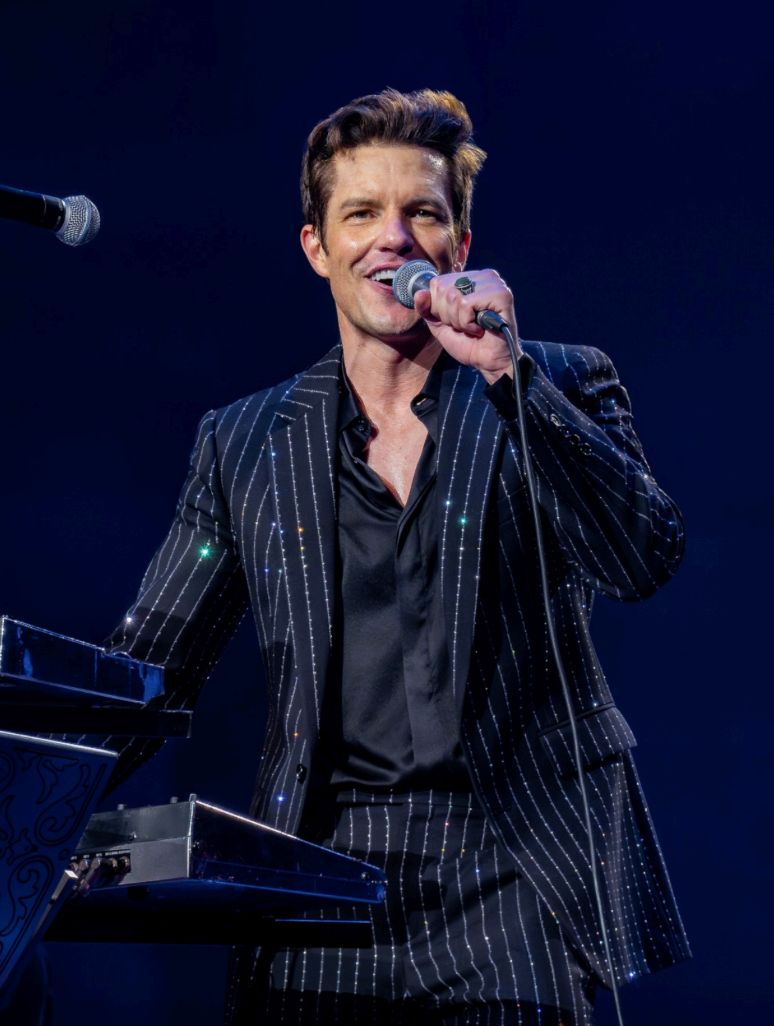
- Flowers performing in 2025

Background information
- Born: Brandon Richard Flowers; June 21, 1981 (age 45); Henderson, Nevada, U.S.
- Genres: Alternative rock; pop rock; post-punk revival; new wave; heartland rock; synth-pop
- Occupations: Singer; songwriter; musician; philanthropist
- Instruments: Vocals; keyboards; bass; guitar
- Works: Discography
- Years active: 2001–present
- Labels: Island; Vertigo; Marrakesh
- Member of: The Killers
- Spouse: Tana Mundkowsky (m. 2005)
- Awards: Full list
- Website: brandonflowersmusic.com

Brandon Richard Flowers (born June 21, 1981) is an American musician. He is the lead vocalist, primary songwriter, keyboardist, and occasional bassist of the Las Vegas–based rock band the Killers, which he formed with Dave Keuning in 2001.

In addition to his work with the Killers, Flowers has released three solo albums, Flamingo (2010), The Desired Effect (2015), and Thrasher (2026). He has reached number one on the UK Albums Chart ten times, and on the Billboard 200 once (top ten, eight times), including work with the Killers.

== Early life ==
Brandon Richard Flowers, the youngest of six children, was born on June 21, 1981, in the Las Vegas suburb of Henderson, Nevada, to Jean Yvonne (née Barlow; 1945–2010) and Terry Austin Flowers. He has an older brother and four older sisters. His parents met as teenagers, and he wrote the song "A Dustland Fairytale" (also known as "Dustland") as a tribute to their marriage and lifelong romance. His grandmother was from Lithuania, and his cousin is Craig Barlow, an inductee to the Las Vegas Golf Hall of Fame.

Flowers' family lived in Henderson until Flowers was eight, when they moved to Payson, Utah, for two years before moving to Nephi, Utah, when he was in the sixth grade. Flowers lived in Nephi until his junior year at Juab High School, when in 1997, at 16, he moved back to Las Vegas to live with his aunt. He graduated from Chaparral High School in 1999.

Flowers said that growing up in Las Vegas as a member of the Church of Jesus Christ of Latter-day Saints (LDS Church) helped prepare him for the world of rock and roll: "Really, being a Mormon in Las Vegas prepared me for the lion's den. It is Sin City. The things that go on, the lights, it's the ultimate rock and roll stage. Without Las Vegas, I would be a wreck."

== Career ==
=== The Killers (2001–present) ===
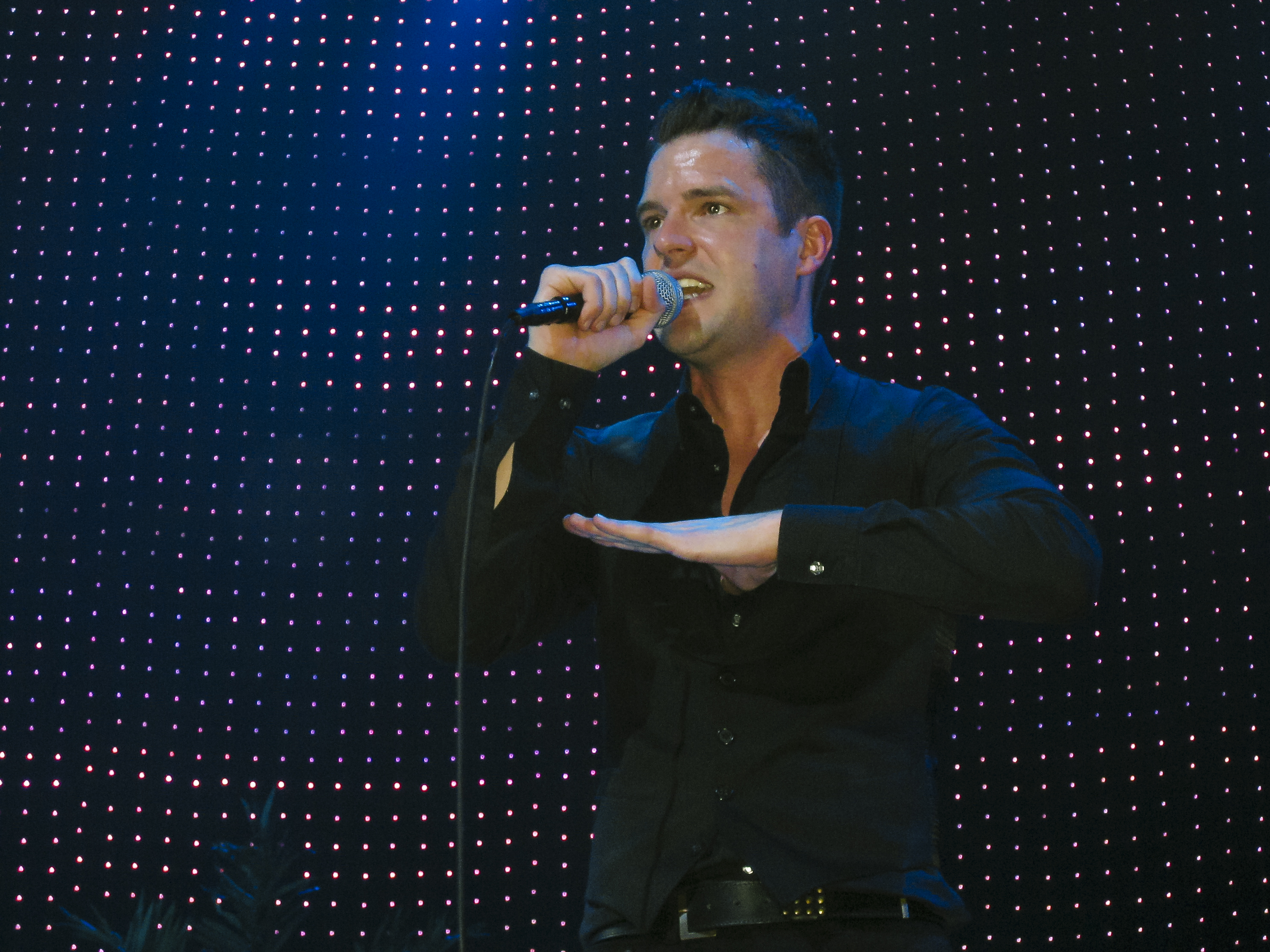
Brandon Flowers singing for the Killers Day & Age World Tour

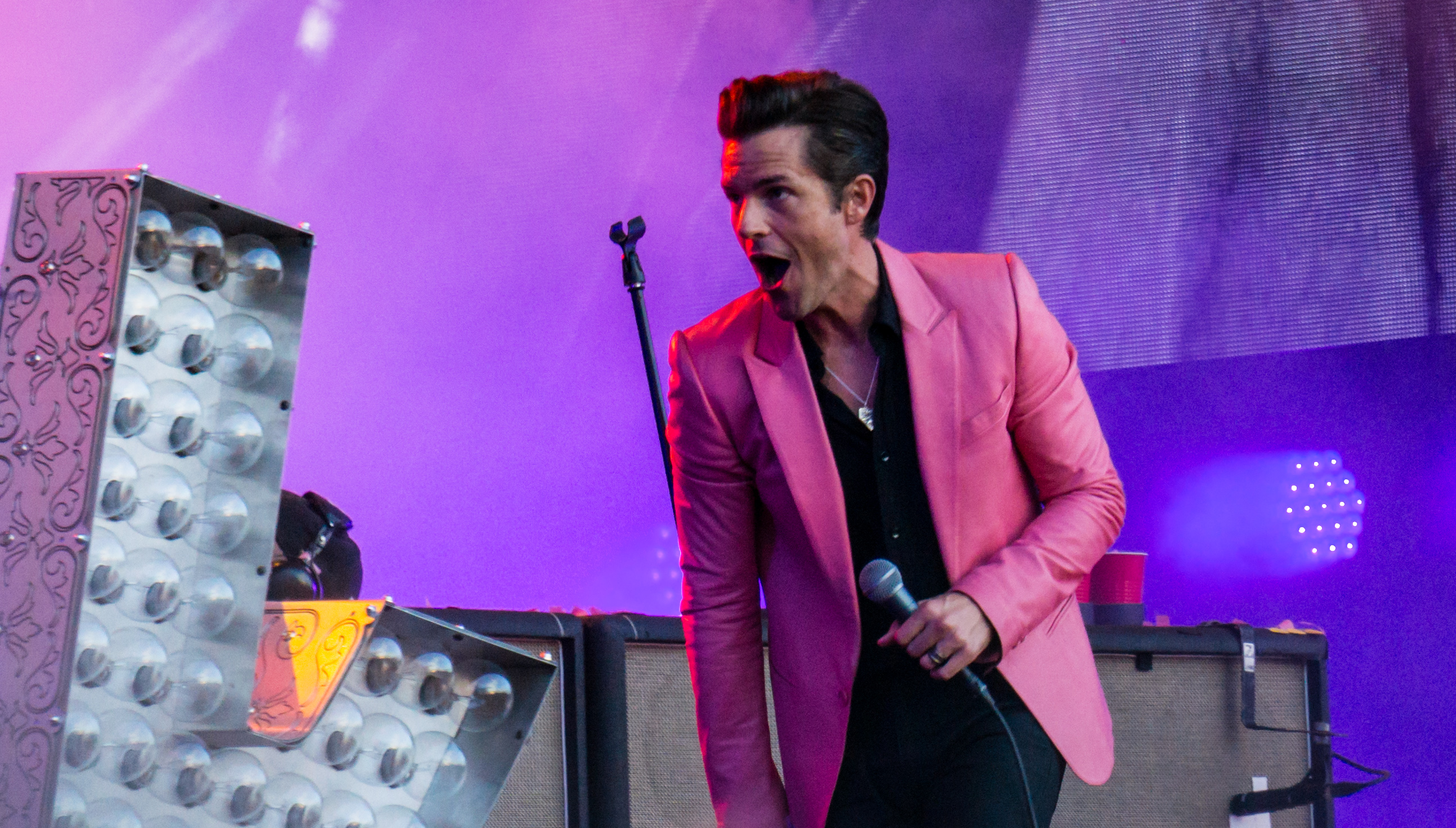
Flowers onstage at BST Hyde Park in 2017

Flowers responded to an ad that Dave Keuning had placed in the Las Vegas Weekly in late 2001, whereupon they became the Killers. After several short-lived bassists and drummers, Flowers and Keuning were joined by bassist Mark Stoermer and drummer Ronnie Vannucci, and the line-up became official in August 2002. Between 2003 and 2021, they released seven consecutive chart-topping studio albums and have sold over 22 million records worldwide. The Killers are among those artists who have spent more than 1,000 weeks on the UK music charts during their career. Flowers wrote the lyrics to the single "All These Things That I've Done" that numbered among the "100 Greatest Songs of All Time" by The Daily Telegraph and earned one of the band's seven Grammy nominations. He is also the lyricist of "Mr. Brightside," which is the third biggest selling/streaming song of all time in the United Kingdom and also holds the record for most weeks spent on the UK singles chart, at over 450 weeks. Their second album Sam's Town, paid homage to Flowers' hometown and family, and earned the band their first BRIT Awards (Best International Album and Group), and included the chart-topping single "When You Were Young". Before releasing their first Billboard 200 No. 1 album Wonderful Wonderful (2017) and chart topping single "The Man", the band took a one-year hiatus during which Flowers released his second and most favorably reviewed solo album to that date.

On July 4, 2010, the Killers headlined the "Salute to the Military" USO Concert at the White House. They performed "God Bless America" and favorites from their catalogue. On June 22, 2013, the Killers headlined the 90,000-capacity Wembley Stadium, their biggest solo show to date.

=== Solo career (2010–present) ===
==== Flamingo (2010–11) ====
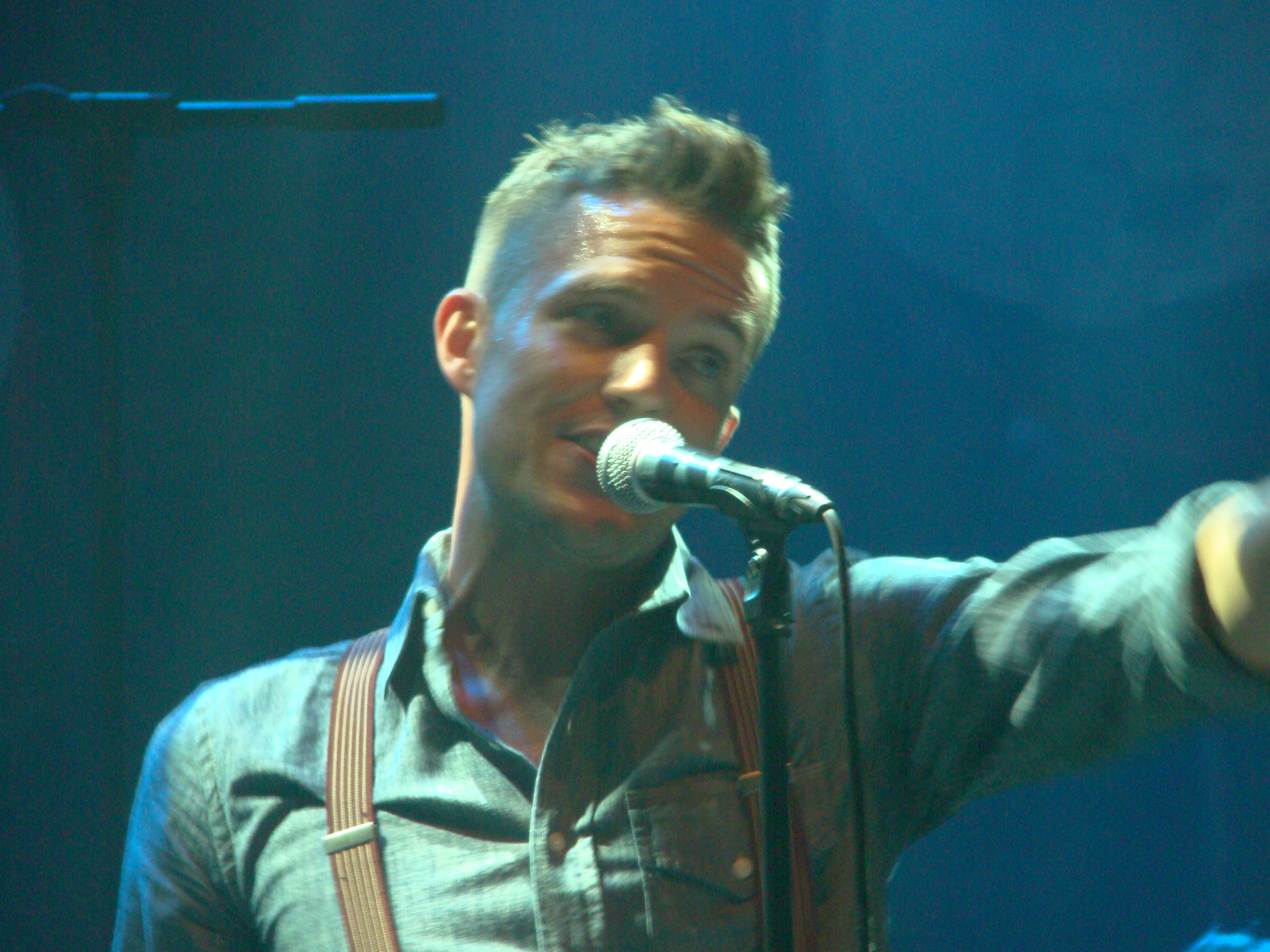
Flowers on the Flamingo Road Tour in 2010

Flowers' debut solo studio album, Flamingo, was released on September 3, 2010, and charted in the top ten albums in ten countries, including the UK, where it charted at number one. The album drew heavy influence from Flowers' hometown of Las Vegas, Nevada, and earned Flowers a Q Award nomination for Best Male Artist (2010). The first single from Flamingo, "Crossfire", was released on June 21. It became Flowers' first top ten single in the UK as a solo artist and was certified silver by the BPI. The video for "Crossfire" featured actress Charlize Theron and was nominated for Best Video at the NME Awards. Flamingo was Flowers' fourth consecutive studio album to reach No. 1 on the UK charts, including work by the Killers. Flamingo was succeeded by two singles: "Only the Young" and "Jilted Lovers & Broken Hearts". Prior to the release of Flamingo, Flowers debuted his solo act at the Shimmer Showroom in Las Vegas on August 15, 2010, being named by Spin as one of the "15 Best Shows of the Summer". Following the release of the album, Flowers embarked on the Flamingo Road Tour in small theaters across the United States, being described by Spin as one of the "25 Best Fall Tours"/"Must-See Fall Tours".

==== The Desired Effect (2015) ====
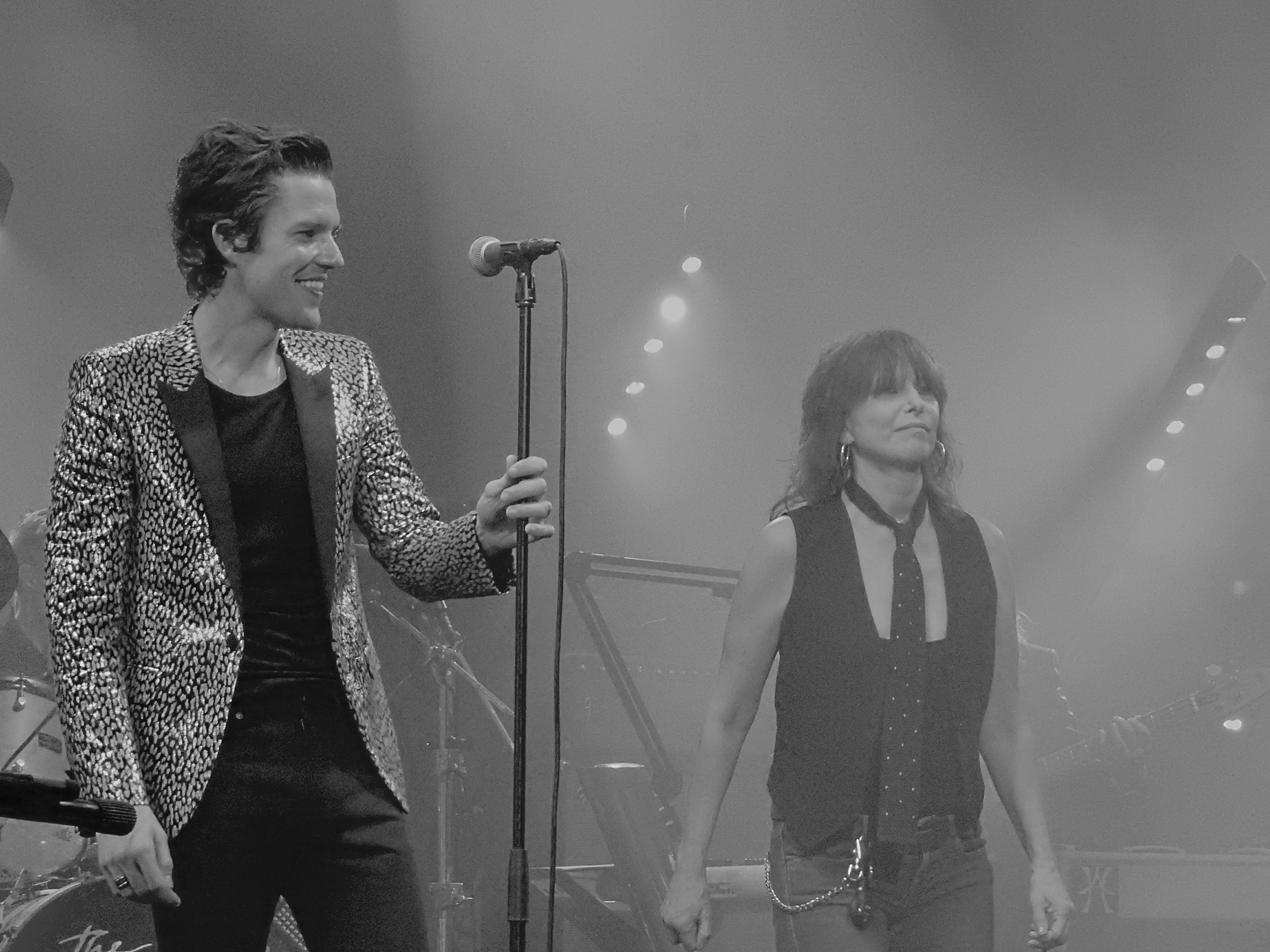
Flowers with Chrissie Hynde on The Desired Effect Tour in 2015

Flowers' second solo studio album, The Desired Effect, was released on May 15, 2015. The album debuted at number one on the UK Albums Chart, making it Flowers' second consecutive solo No. 1 album. Flowers stated that the album was "definitely going to be different" from his last album, and he referred to producer Ariel Rechtshaid as his "co-captain". The album featured performances by notable musicians including Bruce Hornsby, Tony Levin, Joey Waronker, Carlos Alomar, and Kenny Aronoff. The Desired Effect is Flowers' highest yet ranked album on Metacritic and honored as the Album of the Year (2015) by The San Francisco Examiner. Reviews positively described the album as Flowers' finest work since Hot Fuss. The album was preceded by positively reviewed singles "Can't Deny My Love", "Still Want You", "Lonely Town", and "I Can Change". Multiple tracks from the album were listed on Best Songs of 2015 So Far lists by publications including SPIN, NPR, and Mashable. Halfway through 2015, USA Today listed the album as one of the top five best albums of 2015 so far.

The Desired Effect Tour included performances in Europe and North America; it ran through October 1, 2015. MTV rated Flowers' tour stop at London's Brixton Academy five stars. Flowers also performed for U.S. President Barack Obama at the 2015 National Clean Energy Summit. Flowers also performed at that year's Royal Variety Performance at the Royal Albert Hall for members of the British royal family.

==== Thrasher and untitled fourth studio album (2026–present) ====
Flowers on the Thrasher Tour in 2026

Flowers' third solo studio album, Thrasher, was released on August 21, 2026, and debuted at number three on the UK Albums Chart. Drawing influence from artists such as Johnny Cash and Waylon Jennings, the album was recorded in Nashville, Tennessee with producers Jonathan Rado and Shawn Everett. Thrasher featured performances from musicians such as Bruce Bouton, Charlie McCoy, and David Rawlings, and was preceded by singles "Plans", "Paradise", and "Tiger's Blood", all of which were praised by critics. Flowers embarked on a tour in support of Thrasher that ran through October 27, 2026.

Flowers revealed in 2023 that he was working on at least one solo album that embodied "a little bit of [his] first two solo records," describing the album as "almost wrapped up". In a later interview with NME, Flowers confirmed that he had two "south west" solo records that are "more in the 'Flamingo' direction". In December 2025, Flowers confirmed that the two solo records that he recorded in Nashville were "complete", with one "almost mixed" and the other following shortly.

=== Collaborations ===
In addition to his work with the Killers, Flowers has collaborated with Avicii, Brian Fallon, Chrissie Hynde, New Order, Travis & Chris Martin, and Robbie Williams.

In 2022, Flowers and the Killers invited Bruce Springsteen to perform with them at Madison Square Garden. In 2023, he was invited to perform alongside Elton John at the Glastonbury Festival.

== Personal life ==
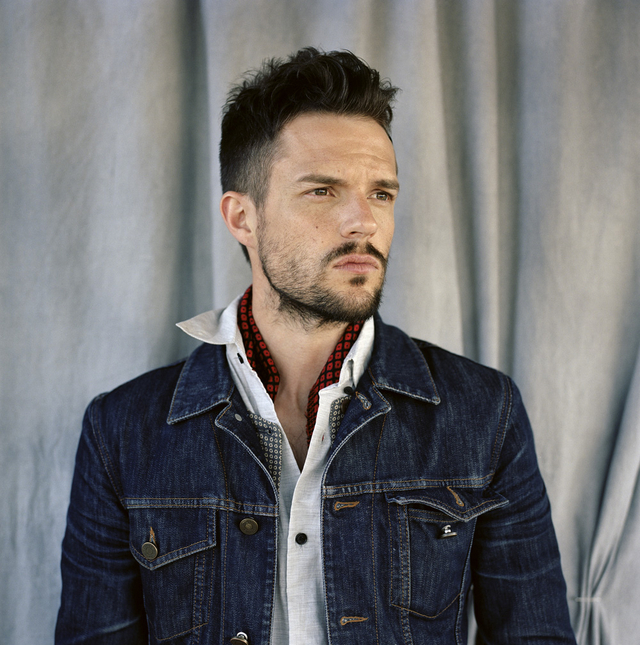
Flowers in 2011

Flowers married Tana Mundkowsky in 2005 and lives in Las Vegas, Nevada, and Park City, Utah. He wrote the song "Some Kind of Love" for his wife who suffers from PTSD. He and his wife have three sons, born in 2007, 2009, and 2011. Their sons attended their first Killers concert in July 2017, at London's Hyde Park.

Flowers is a member of the Church of Jesus Christ of Latter-Day Saints. In 2012, he discussed his religion on Scandinavian television show Skavlan, where he debated Richard Dawkins on the subject. He and his family are featured in a promotional video on the church's website. He also shared his beliefs with some of the church's leadership in 2022.

Flowers' portrait was painted by British artist Joe Simpson for his "Musician Portraits" series that was exhibited at the Royal Albert Hall in 2012.

== Philanthropy ==
From 2006 to 2016, the Killers released annual Christmas themed singles and videos in aid of the charity Product Red, supporting the Global Fund to Fight AIDS, Tuberculosis and Malaria. The singles later formed the charity compilation album Don't Waste Your Wishes (2016). Elton John listed Flowers as one of his top five heroes while editing The Independent's World AIDS Day special edition. The Killers have also contributed songs for cover albums with proceeds going to charities supporting natural disaster relief (Rhythms del Mundo Classics) and famine-stricken areas (AHK-toong BAY-bi Covered). The Killers co-organized a benefit concert in December 2017 for those affected by the 2017 Las Vegas shooting, raising more than $700,000.

== Artistry ==
Flowers performing in Swansea, Wales in 2018.

Attributed to the genres alternative rock, new wave, heartland rock, synth-pop, pop rock, and post-punk revival, Flowers is regarded as a prominent frontman of the new wave revival in the 2000s. As a solo artist, Flowers first exhibited elements of heartland rock as well as new-wave-style alternative rock. On his second album, Flowers exhibited greater pop tendencies, prompting Rolling Stone to dub The Desired Effect "the best straight-up pop album made by a rock star in recent memory." On his third album, Flowers leaned into the music of his father, comprising elements of country, country western and Americana.

Flowers is a tenor. U2's lead singer Bono praised Flowers' voice to The Globe and Mail in 2015, saying "We need him on the radio .... His voice!" Bruce Springsteen also praised his voice at the Ivor Novello Awards in 2025, calling it "one of the most beautiful, pure voices in all of Rock 'N' Roll."

Flowers normally uses in the studio and on tour his Korg MicroKorg synth as well as the Nord Lead 2 (2002-2008). He later used the Nord Lead 2x (2003-present).

Flowers has listed Bruce Springsteen, Oingo Boingo, Duran Duran, Pet Shop Boys, the Smiths, the Cars, Depeche Mode, New Order, the Cure, and OMD among his musical influences.

== Discography ==
=== Solo ===
- Flamingo (2010)
- The Desired Effect (2015)
- Thrasher (2026)

=== The Killers ===
- Hot Fuss (2004)
- Sam's Town (2006)
- Day & Age (2008)
- Battle Born (2012)
- Wonderful Wonderful (2017)
- Imploding the Mirage (2020)
- Pressure Machine (2021)

== Tours ==
- Flamingo Road Tour (2010–11)
- The Desired Effect Tour (2015)
- Thrasher Tour (2026)

== Awards and nominations ==
Brandon Flowers has been awarded the Ivor Novello Awards' Special International Award and the Q Idol Award, and appeared on multiple greatest-frontman-of-all-time lists published by various outlets.

The Killers have been nominated for seven GRAMMY Awards, eight BRIT Awards, and two World Music Awards.

== See also ==
- List of UK Albums Chart number ones of the 2010s
- List of people from Nevada
- Music of Nevada
