= Live at Lincoln Hall =

Live album by Joe Pug
- Released: 2011
- Genre: Folk rock, Acoustic
- Label: Lightning Rod Records

Joe Pug chronology
| Messenger (2010) | Live at Lincoln Hall (2011) | The Great Despiser (2012) |

Live at Lincoln Hall is Joe Pug's first live album. The album was recorded at Lincoln Hall in Chicago. The album includes a guest appearance by Strand of Oaks, who were touring with Pug at the time of the recording. It is the first album by Pug to include a cover: "Deep Dark Wells," based on the song "Start Again" by Austin musician Harvey "Tex" Thomas Young.

== Track listing ==
1. "Nobody's Man" - 4:03
2. "Lock the Door Christina" - 2:56
3. "I Do My Father's Drugs" - 3:15
4. "Messenger" - 5:36
5. "In the Meantime" - 4:23
6. "Unsophisticated Heart" - 3:00
7. "How Good You Are" - 4:13
8. "The Door Was Always Open" - 3:46
9. "Disguised As Someone Else" - 3:23
10. "Hymn #101" - 5:30
11. "Deep Dark Wells" - 2:57
12. "Hymn #35" - 4:28
13. "Call It What You Will" - 3:44
14. "Nation of Heat" - 3:22
15. "Speak Plainly Diana" - 4:38
16. "Leave Ruin (Strand of Oaks)" - 3:52
17. "Dodging the Wind" - 5:23
