= In the Meantime (Joe Pug EP) =

EP by Joe Pug
- Released: 2010
- Genres: Folk; acoustic
- Length: 18:21

Joe Pug chronology
| Nation of Heat (2009) | In the Meantime (2010) | Messenger (2011) |

In the Meantime is the second EP by American singer-songwriter Joe Pug. In 2010, while recording what would eventually become his first full-length album, Pug released In the Meantime free of charge to subscribers of his email list. Pug stated that the EP was "a thank you of sorts to all the fans that have helped spread my music around to their friends and family over the last year." The EP consists of five previously unreleased songs recorded during the sessions that produced Nation of Heat.

== Track listing ==
1. "Dodging the Wind" – 4:03
2. "In the Meantime" – 3:17
3. "Lock the Door Christina" – 2:40
4. "A Thousand Men" – 3:50
5. "Black Eyed Susan" – 4:31
