= The Great Despiser =

Studio album by Joe Pug
- Released: 2012
- Genre: Folk rock
- Label: Lightning Rod Records

Joe Pug chronology
Live at Lincoln Hall (2011)	The Great Despiser (2012)	Windfall (2015)

The Great Despiser is Joe Pug's second studio album. The album's opening track, "Hymn #76," was selected by American Songwriter magazine as one of the Top 50 Songs of 2012.

== Track listing ==
1. "Hymn #76" – 3:37
2. "Those Thankless Years" – 3:05
3. "The Great Despiser" – 4:05
4. "A Gentle Few" – 3:53
5. "Ours" – 4:03
6. "Silver Harps and Violins" – 4:13
7. "Stronger Than The World" – 3:16
8. "One of Many" – 3:09
9. "Neither Do I Need A Witness" – 3:26
10. "The Servant's Ace" – 3:11
11. "Deep Dark Wells" – 2:51

== Credits ==
- Joe Pug - Composer, Guitar (Acoustic), Guitar (Tenor), Harmonica, Primary Artist, Vocals
- Don Bartlett - Management
- Jim Becker - Banjo, Fiddle, Mandolin, Slide Guitar
- Josh Brinkman - Booking
- Brian Deck - Drums, Mixing, Producer
- Craig Finn - Vocals
- Dorian Gehring - Assistant
- Sam Kassirer - Marimba, Organ, Piano
- Mike Novak - Assistant
- Gordon Patriarca - Bass
- Neil Strauch - Engineer
- Shawn Stucky - Artwork, Design
- Greg Tuohey - Guitar (Acoustic), Guitar (Electric)
- Harvey Thomas Young - Composer
