= Windfall (sculpture) =

Public art work by Robert Murray

Coordinates: 43°10′34.0″N 87°56′07.3″W

- Artist: Robert Murray
- Year: 1966
- Type: aluminum
- Dimensions: 120 cm × 290 cm × 61 cm (48 in × 114 in × 24 in)
- Location: Lynden Sculpture Garden; Milwaukee, Wisconsin
- Owner: Bradley Family Foundation

Windfall is a public art work by Canadian artist Robert Murray located at the Lynden Sculpture Garden near Milwaukee, Wisconsin. The sculpture is an abstract form made of aluminum panels set at angles; it is painted bright red and installed on the lawn.
