= Windfall (Joe Pug album) =

Studio album by Joe Pug
- Released: 2015
- Genres: Folk, acoustic
- Labels: Lightning Rod Records, Loose

Joe Pug chronology
The Great Despiser (2012)	Windfall (2015)

Windfall is Joe Pug's third album. Pug cites more contemporary influences for this album, including Josh Ritter, Ryan Adams, and M. Ward. However, Pug's trademark literary influences are still present: the chorus of "The Measure," which repeats, "all we've lost is nothing to what we've found" is inspired by a quote by Frederick Buechner's novel Godric.

== Reception ==
Professional ratings
Review scores
Source	Rating
Paste	7.6/10

The album met positive reviews, with Paste Magazine rating it 7.6/10, adding: "In lesser hands, songs of this nature could take on the tone of self-help books, maxims of dubious value. But Pug’s honesty and wordplay combine to levitate the songs over those empty, clichéd realms. And the straightforward, balanced arrangements of acoustic and electric guitars and upright bass, with occasional piano, harmonica and drums, drive the focus to Pug’s vocals."

The Lexington Herald-Leader praised the album's two-band approach as presenting an "elegiac, electric vitality" to the "unhurried solemnity" of the songs. Windfall's hopeful final track – "If Still It Can't Be Found," which featured Wilco's Pat Sansone on mellotron – received particular acclaim, with a Rolling Stone review noting that "it showcases the singer's unique and achingly honest point of view that spins lyrics into folk poetry."

== Track listing ==
1. "Bright Beginnings" – 3:35
2. "Veteran Fighter" – 3:37
3. "Stay and Dance" – 3:31
4. "The Measure" – 3:17
5. "Great Hosannas" – 4:08
6. "Burn and Shine" – 3:33
7. "O My Chesapeake" – 5:10
8. "Windfallen" – 3:08
9. "Pair of Shadows" – 3:10
10. "If Still It Can't Be Found" – 2:49

== Personnel ==
- Joe Pug – acoustic guitar, harmonica, piano, vocals
- JT Bates – drums
- Emily Hagihara – percussion
- Tom Hnatow – pedal steel guitar, piano
- Cheyenne Mize – violin
- Pat Sansone – mellotron
- Matt Schuessler – bass
- Greg Tuohey – electric guitar
- Rose Guerin – vocal harmony
- Mark Charles Heidinger – vocal harmony
- Richard Dodd – mastering
- Duane Lundy – engineer, mixing, producer
