= Joe Pug =

American musician

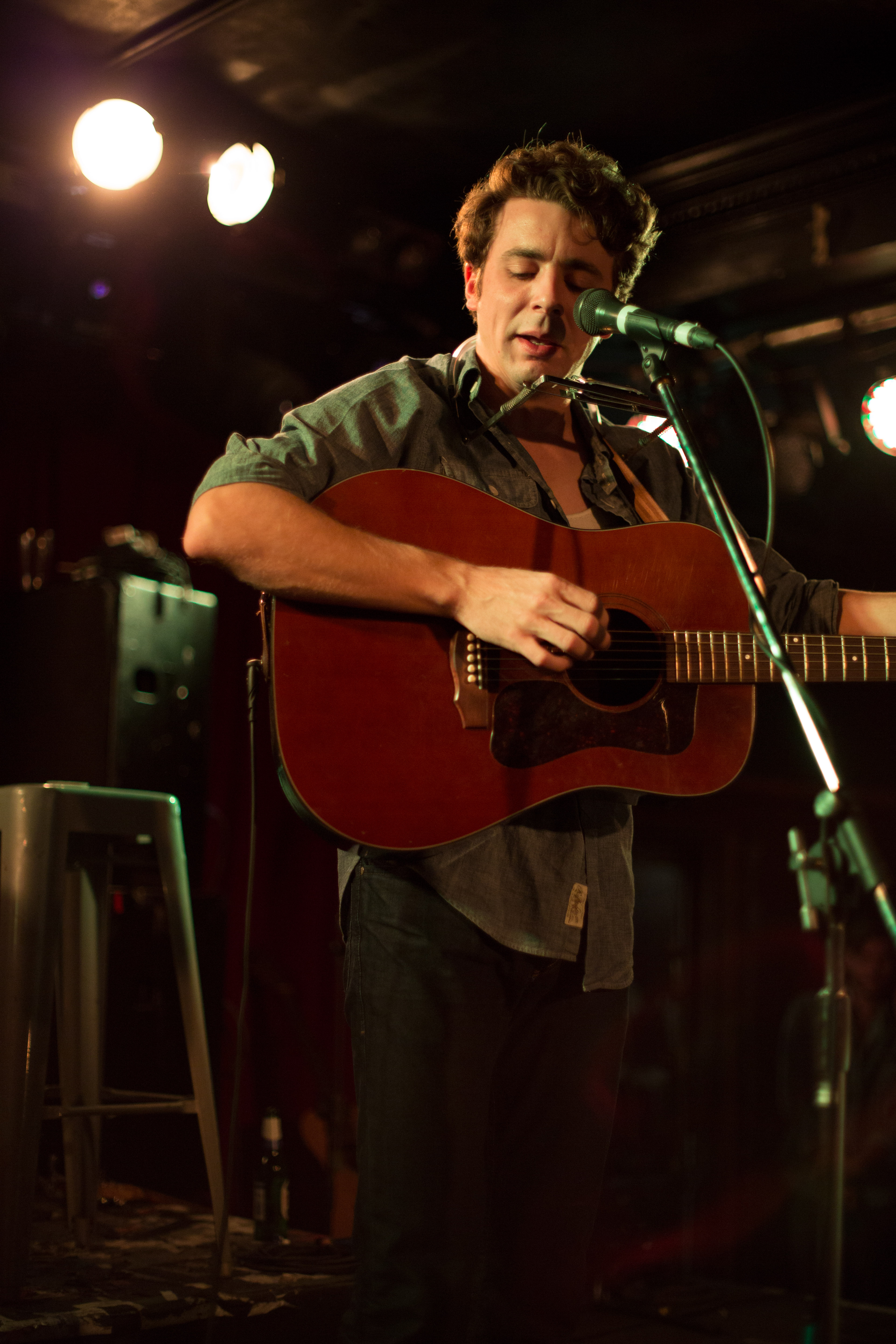
- Joe Pug live in 2012

Background information
- Born: Joseph Pugliese; April 20, 1984 (age 42)
- Genres: Folk; Acoustic; Folk rock; Americana
- Occupation: Singer-songwriter
- Instruments: Vocals, acoustic guitar, harmonica, electric piano
- Years active: 2007–present
- Labels: Lightning Rod Records, Loose Music
- Website: joepugmusic.com

Joe Pug (born Joseph Pugliese, April 20, 1984) is an American singer-songwriter from Greenbelt, Maryland. He has released two EPs, as well as the albums Messenger, The Great Despiser, Windfall, The Flood in Color, and The Diving Sun.

While working as a carpenter in Chicago after dropping out of the University of North Carolina, Pug wrote and recorded what would eventually become his debut EP, Nation of Heat. Its literate lyrics received widespread acclaim and Pug's unorthodox promotional strategy of distributing free CDs to anyone interested in sharing his music resulted in the EP selling over 20,000 copies. After touring with Steve Earle in 2009, Pug was signed by Nashville indie label Lightning Rod Records and released Messenger in 2010. After moving to Austin, Pug released The Great Despiser in 2012.

Pug's acclaimed narrative songwriting has led critics to draw comparisons between his work and that of John Prine and Bob Dylan. His stated influences include John Hiatt, Warren Zevon, and Beck, as well as literary figures such as John Dos Passos, John Steinbeck, Raymond Carver and most notably, Walt Whitman.

== Background ==
Pug is originally from Greenbelt, Maryland, where he lived in the Old Greenbelt neighborhood. He began performing music at a young age at Greenbelt's New Deal Cafe.

Pug attended Eleanor Roosevelt High School. While in high school, Pug, according to a Washingtonian interview, "played in cover bands and at New Year's Eve parties to make money" but "never seriously considered a career in music." One such band was Guys with Ties, an R&B and blues cover band which Pug co-founded and played saxophone for. He participated in the Roosevelt drama department, performing in Woody Allen's "Don't Drink the Water" among other plays. He also performed improv comedy in his high school, a craft which he continued throughout his time at college.

Pug graduated from high school in 2002 and enrolled at University of North Carolina - Chapel Hill, where he studied playwriting. Pug later told Kentucky.com that studying theater had helped his future music career:

Studying theater in college definitely helped in the performance aspect of what I do now. The creative part of it, where you're generating material and writing songs and then performing those songs... these are almost entirely different jobs. But theater definitely helped with the performance part.

== Origins ==
In 2005, on the night before his senior year fall classes were to start, Pug dropped out of college and drove directly to Chicago, having thought (as he mentioned later to The Daily Tar Heel): "I had a moment where I realized life is short and I knew where I wanted to be and I should just get there." That week, he took a job as a carpenter and moved into an apartment in Logan Square. Pug has described his two-day trip from Chapel Hill in his Ford Ranger and his first week in Chicago as "the most magical experience of my entire life".

Pug soon began playing music again at open-mike nights at a local bar. When asked why he began pursuing folk music instead of other musical genres or the playwriting he studied at college, Pug responded:

It’s always been the music I’ve listened to most, though I’ve listened to different stuff along the way. I tried to write plays, but the reason it didn’t work is because I hadn’t seen or read enough plays. The albums I’ve listened to in the genre of American singer-songwriters hitting the road is innumerable. I feel really comfortable speaking that language.

Developing on ideas and themes he was originally attempting to express in a play he was writing called "Austin Fish," Pug began writing the songs that would later become his first EP, Nation of Heat. The songs were recorded at a local Chicago studio, where a friend snuck him in to record during late night slots that other musicians had cancelled. In 2009, after Pug self-released Nation of Heat, he began shipping fans 2-song sampler CDs to pass along to their friends. The unconventional promotional strategy was a success, resulting in Pug sending out over 15,000 samplers and Nation of Heat selling over 20,000 copies. As Pug later recalled on his website:

People requested 2 copies, 5 copies, 10 copies, 20 copies. We’d send them all. We even covered the postage. Suddenly we’d be rolling into towns that we’d never been before and there would be crowds there who knew the songs. Our fans essentially became like a radio station for us, and they still are.

The EP was a critical success, drawing comparisons to the work of Bob Dylan and Josh Ritter. "Hymn #101," Nation of Heat's opening song, drew special attention, being spotlighted on NPR's Second Stage music blog.

After seeing Pug play as his opener, Rhett Miller passed Pug's music onto Steve Earle, with whom he shared a manager. Earle subsequently tapped Pug, at age 23, to open for his Townes Van Zandt tribute tour. Pug considers this his "first big break":

When Steve Earle released his Townes album, he tapped me to open his tour. It was a couple months in the U.S. and Europe. He was playing solo, so every night, there were only two people on stage. First me, then Steve. I was too young to be as terrified as I should have been. It was his endorsement that really made people take notice. Everyone needs that first hand up into the business, and Steve extended his to me. Grateful does not begin to describe the feelings I have for him. Since then, it’s been a slow and steady burn.

As he toured the country in 2009 and 2010 in his 1995 Plymouth Voyager, Pug became increasingly linked with the burgeoning indie-folk scene associated with bands such as The Low Anthem, Langhorne Slim, and Horse Feathers.

In 2009, Pug released In the Meantime, an EP of songs that were recorded but not released on Nation of Heat. This second EP was made available for free on Pug's website for anyone who joined his mailing list.

== Lightning Rod Records and Messenger ==
The Earle tour and the crowds generated by Nation of Heat piqued the attention of Lightning Rod Records, the Nashville independent label behind folk and Americana acts such as Jason Isbell, James McMurtry, Amanda Shires, and High Cotton. In 2010, Lightning Rod signed Pug and released his debut full-length album, Messenger. On Messenger, a full backing band supplemented Pug's guitar, vocals and harmonica, a change featured most notably on an electric version of Nation of Heat's "Speak Plainly, Diana." Reviewers, like Steve Kolowich at the Washington City Paper, noted that, with Messenger, in contrast to Nation of Heat, Pug turns from declarative and extroverted to reflective and introspective:

"His lyrics are less declarative, and sometimes quake with doubt: 'Not So Sure' is a penitent ode to epistemology. 'Unsophisticated Heart' is an admission of immaturity that literally ends with a whimper. 'Disguised as Someone Else' is a fantasy in which the singer disavows his identity to hide from his regret. On the last record, Pug shouted, 'I have done wrong, I will do wrong, there’s nothing wrong with doing wrong!' Here, he seems to tack on a meek amendment: 'These days, I’m not so sure.'"

The album met critical acclaim, with Paste Magazine rating it 9.1/10, adding: “unless your surname is Dylan, Waits, Ritter or Prine, you could face-palm yourself to death trying to pen songs half as inspired as the 10 tracks on Joe Pug's debut full-length." The success of Nation of Heat and Messenger led Pug to tours and performances with M. Ward, Josh Ritter and Levon Helm, as well as invitations to Lollapalooza and the Newport Folk Festival. In August 2010, Pug announced "The $10 Tour," an attempt by Pug to rein in ticket service fees for his shows. The tour was Pug's first headline tour with the Hundred Mile Band, his backing band consisting of Matt Schuessler on standup bass and Greg Tuohey on guitar.

== Austin and The Great Despiser ==
In 2011, Pug moved to Austin, Texas, lured by the Texas songwriting tradition that produced the likes of, in Pug's listing, Steve Earle, Lucinda Williams, Jimmie Dale Gilmore, David Halley and Billy Joe Shaver. Pug later described the move as follows:

"Chicago is a very difficult place to leave, especially when it has supported my music to the level that it has. But I found myself enamored with the contributions that Texas has made to the American songbook and I had to go see where it was born."

He frequently makes reference to the influence of Texas' songwriting legacy in interviews, telling KDHX "there's been a lot of songwriters I wasn't familiar with before I moved to Texas but now really think are influential in my writing." In his touring throughout 2011 and 2012, Pug began paying tribute to Austin musician Harvey "Tex" Thomas Young by playing "Deep Dark Wells," his cover of Thomas' "Start Again," which Thomas originally wrote as a poem to his jailed brother.

Pug toured with Strand of Oaks in April and May 2011. The two acts promoted the tour by releasing covers of each other's songs: Pug for Strand of Oaks' "End in Flames" and Strand of Oaks for Pug's "Hymn #101." Pug's April 29, 2011, performance during this tour at Lincoln Hall in Chicago, Illinois was recorded live and released as Live at Lincoln Hall.

As soon as Messenger was released, Pug immediately began writing the songs that would become his second full-length album. To help create thicker "arrangements that can stand shoulder to shoulder with the lyrics," Pug brought on producer Brian Deck, who he had known from his time in Chicago. The Great Despiser was released in April 2012.

The A.V. Club described The Great Despiser as an album of literate regret, comparable to the work of John Prine, Josh Ritter, and Richard Buckner. The album's title track, "Hymn #76," which Paste Magazine described as "a fable of life and the reoccurring themes attached to growing older and moving on," is a continuation of the narrative in Nation of Heat's "Hymn #35" and "Hymn #101."

== Break, Windfall, and Later Works ==
After a heavy touring schedule in 2013, Pug considered quitting music. As he later told Denver's Westword that "hitting the road can make you go broke really quick" and that he "had expectations that were all out of whack." About the period, he wrote:

"Everyone kept congratulating me on how well the tour was going, and the mood was probably the best it had ever been on the road. We finally got two hotel rooms in each city instead of one. We’ve got this incredible group of die-hard fans that somehow make each show bigger than our previous trip through town. Meanwhile my relationship was in shambles and creatively I was at a dead end. There was absolutely no joy left in playing music. So we walked off stage after a particular show when I played terribly, and pulled my manager aside in the green room and told him to cancel the rest of the tour dates and that I was essentially through."

However, in 2014, Pug took a break from touring, recommitting to, in his own words, "behaving like a human being again":

"I needed to reconnect with my girlfriend. I needed to eat healthy food. I needed to go enjoy live music as a fan. I really needed to make sure I still loved making music, because I really had my doubts at that point."

He soon realized that he had the ability to give it all up, later telling American Songwriter: "I don't feel like I would sacrifice everything for music. Life is bigger than that." Coming out that turning point, he became engaged to fellow musician Jamie Zanelotti of The Hems and began writing again, penning what would eventually become his next album. Later that year, he began recording at producer Duane Lundy's Shangri-La Productions studio in Lexington, Kentucky, aiming to "capture the music just the way we play it, with minimal production."

This period of reflection and recommitment culminated in the 2015 release of Windfall, Pug's third album. As a Paste review notes, the optimistic album "steps away from the more traditional Americana for a folk-soul hybrid that places greater emphasis on his vocals." The Lexington Herald-Leader praised the album's two-band approach as presenting an "elegiac, electric vitality" to the "unhurried solemnity" of the songs. Windfall's hopeful final track – "If Still It Can't Be Found," which featured Wilco's Pat Sansone on mellotron – received particular acclaim, with a Rolling Stone review noting that "it showcases the singer's unique and achingly honest point of view that spins lyrics into folk poetry."

Joe Pug released The Flood in Color on July 19, 2019 and The Diving Sun on March 21, 2021. On March 8, 2024, Pug announced the release of Sketch of a Promised Departure.

== Influences ==
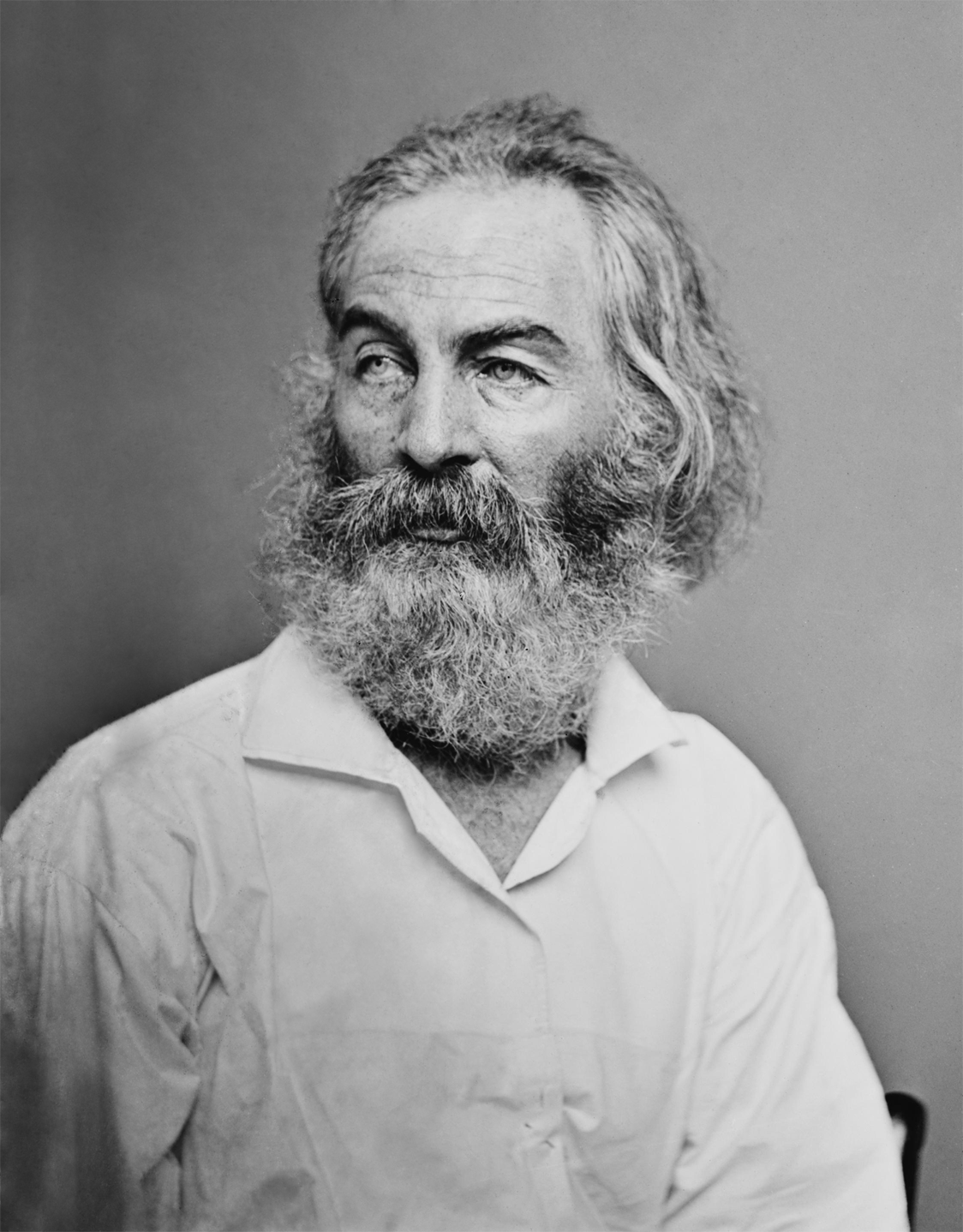
Walt Whitman, who Pug cites as "the biggest influence" for his first EP, Nation of Heat.

Pug's lyrics has been noted for their literary techniques and allusions. Pug admits to this influence, citing various novelists, short story writers and poets as inspirations. John Steinbeck is referenced Messenger's "Not So Sure." Pug cited Walt Whitman as the biggest influence on Nation of Heat, calling "Hymn #35" the "palest imitation of 'Leaves of Grass' in recorded history!" He told Rolling Stone that the biggest influence on The Great Despiser was short story writer Raymond Carver, praising him for how "when you return to a piece of his that you read long ago and realize just how much of your own detail was placed in the gaps." Pug has stated that he is attracted to "the narrative of the individual and the individual being the only thing you can be sure is real in yourself," which, he says, drew him to Walt Whitman and John Steinbeck when he was younger, and Raymond Carver and Cormac McCarthy as he has grown older.

Pug has cited John Hiatt as an influence on his melodic sense and narrative structures. He described the first John Prine record he received from his dad as a memorable moment in his development as a songwriter:

"I’d never heard anything like that before. In a way, it was unfathomable to me that someone could write a song that would be as clear as a well-written book. I mean, I knew exactly what he was saying, immediately."

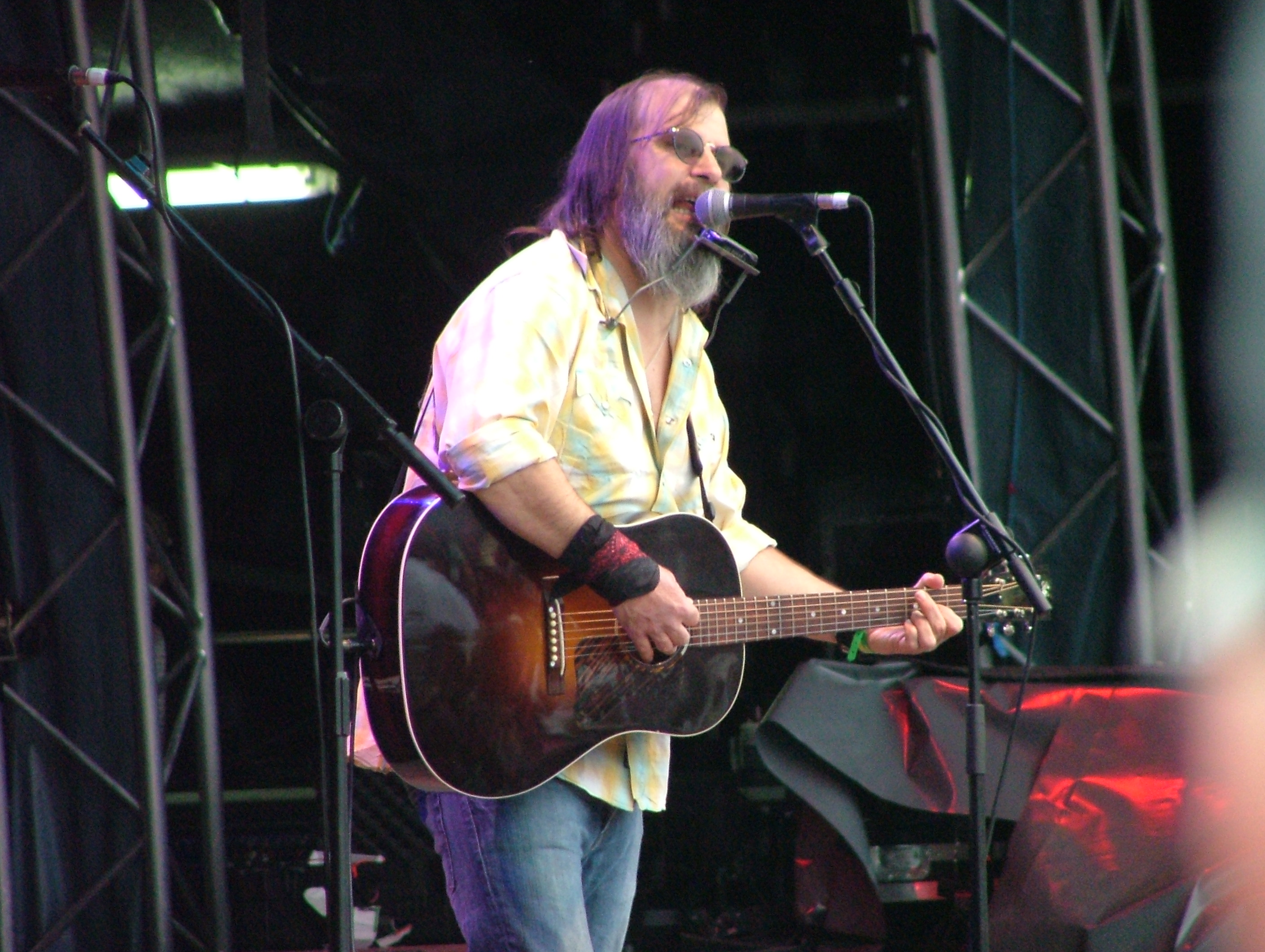
Steve Earle, who Pug opened for in 2009.

Pug credits Steve Earle for teaching him "everything," calling his time touring with him a "master class" in performance. He later told PopMatters:

"For about a month in the states and a month overseas, it would just be me on stage by myself and then him on stage by himself—we’d be the only two people on stage. I was, like, I think, 23 at the time. So, luckily, I was too young and stupid at the time to know how daunting it was. (Laughs) If I had to do that now, I probably couldn’t get through it. I got to watch his show for ninety minutes or two hours every night. I took so much away from it, stuff that I still use on a daily basis. I’d go sell records after my set and as the lights would go down in the lobby I’d run backstage and pull up a chair next to his guitar tech and just watch the show from the side of the stage every night. I’d watch him as he sculpted the set, putting songs in different places. I’d watch him deal with everything from a seated, quiet Sunday night audience to a completely loud, drunk, standing audience somewhere in Scotland—I’d watch him deal with them as well. I got to see just about every scenario."

With Windfall, Pug cites more contemporary influences, such as Josh Ritter, Ryan Adams, and M. Ward. However, Pug's trademark literary influences are still present: the chorus of "The Measure," which repeats, "all we’ve lost is nothing to what we’ve found" is inspired by a quote by Frederick Buechner's novel Godric. Of the reference, Pug explained:

That was the original kernel for the song. It comes from a quote from Frederick Buechner's 'Godric,' which we've actually made the epigram for the album: "The secret that we share I cannot tell in full. But this much I will tell. What's lost is nothing to what's found, and all the death that ever was, set next to life, would scarcely fill a cup." I thought it was a beautiful phrase and tried to write a song that did justice to it.

Throughout his career, Joe Pug has performed and recorded covers in tribute to his influences. He performed Harvey "Tex" Thomas Young's "You Can Go Crazy" on Young's More Than We Was album. On Dead Man's Town: A Tribute to Born in the U.S.A., Pug performed Bruce Springsteen's "Downbound Train", telling Esquire:

"It is at once a testament to the timelessness of the Boss's songwriting and to the unchanged economic torpor of working people in America that this song is so relevant 30 years later. I was thrilled and honored that Lightning Rod Records gave me the opportunity to try to interpret one of my favorite songs from one of my favorite artists."

== The Working Songwriter podcast ==
In 2016, Pug began releasing a podcast entitled "The Working Songwriter", consisting of conversations with artists on "working songwriters talking to one another about life on the road, life in the studio, and life in the writer’s room" "

== Discography ==
Studio Albums

- Messenger (2010)
- The Great Despiser (2012)
- Windfall (2015)
- The Flood in Color (2019)
- The Diving Sun (2021)
- Nation of Heat Revisited (2022)
- Sketch of a Promised Departure (2024)

Studio EPs

- Nation of Heat (2009)
- In the Meantime (2010)

Live Albums

- Live at Lincoln Hall (2011)
- Live at The Old Town School of Folk Music (2025)
