= Nation of Heat =

EP by Joe Pug
- Released: 2009
- Genres: Folk; acoustic
- Length: 24:21

Joe Pug chronology
Nation of Heat (2009)	In the Meantime (2010)

Nation of Heat is the debut EP by American singer-songwriter Joe Pug, released in 2009. Pug recorded Nation of Heat at a Chicago studio his friend had snuck him into when other musicians had cancelled. He self-released the EP and began shipping sampler CDs with some of its songs free of charge to whoever asked for a sample of his music. This unorthodox promotional strategy led to Pug selling 20,000 copies of Nation of Heat, piquing the attention of Lightning Rod Records, the Nashville label with which he would eventually sign. The EP was a critical success, drawing comparisons to the work of Bob Dylan and Josh Ritter. "Hymn #101," the album's opening song, drew special attention, being spotlighted on NPR's Second Stage music blog. In 2022, Pug released Nation of Heat Revisited which featured the same songs (in a different track order) but with added instrumentation.

== Track listing ==
1. "Hymn #101" – 4:40
2. "Call It What You Will" – 2:56
3. "Nobody's Man" – 3:36
4. "Hymn #35" – 3:11
5. "I Do My Father's Drugs" – 2:48
6. "Speak Plainly, Diana" – 2:49
7. "Nation of Heat" – 4:19
