= Still Want You =

Single by Brandon Flowers

from the album The Desired Effect
- Released: April 13, 2015
- Recorded: 2014
- Studio: Battle Born Studios (Winchester, Nevada)
- Genre: Electropop
- Length: 3:15
- Label: Island
- Songwriter: Brandon Flowers
- Producers: Ariel Rechtshaid; Brandon Flowers

Brandon Flowers singles chronology
"Can't Deny My Love" (2015)	"Still Want You" (2015)	"Lonely Town" (2015)

Music video
- "Still Want You" on YouTube

"Still Want You" is the second single by American singer-songwriter Brandon Flowers from his second studio album, The Desired Effect.

== Composition ==
The song reflects on seemingly negative trends in the world (aging, rising crime, climate change, nuclear distress, global disasters) and rebuffs them with the line "I Still Want You". It is ostensibly about staying together.

== Music video ==
In promotion of the video, Flowers's YouTube channel released a series of clips titled "Keys", "Bass", "Drums", "Vox", and "Strings".

The black and white music video was directed by Warren Fu (Daft Punk, The Killers, Haim). The video portrays Flowers and two backup singers in black and white dancing and singing.

== Reception ==
=== Critical ===
Billboard gave the song a positive review remarking that, "[t]his song is awesome . . . When the call and return chorus of Flowers' hook is answered by the high-pitched choral voices, "Still Want You" kicks into another gleeful gear." Stereogum called it a continuance of "the creative renaissance that the Killers frontman seems to be going through with his new solo album, The Desired Effect." Gigwise said of the track, "Flowers delivers on his promise to give us something a bit different, yet it remains just as great as his previous offerings have been." DirectLyrics wrote, "The first single was amazing but this new song is just ‘instant’, quite catchy at moments, and evidently a whole more radio-friendly than its predecessor."

== Track listing ==
Digital download
No.	Title	Writer(s)	Producer(s)	Length
1.	"Still Want You"	Brandon Flowers	Ariel Rechtshaid	3:15

== Accolades ==
Publication	Country	Accolade	Year	Rank
SPIN	United States	The 63 Best Songs of 2015 So Far	2015	48
