= The Desired Effect =

Studio album by Brandon Flowers
- Released: May 15, 2015
- Recorded: 2014–2015
- Studios: Battle Born (Winchester, Nevada) (Note: All tracks); Heavy Duty (Burbank, California); Vox (Hollywood, California) (Note: Tracks 1, 2 and 4–8)
- Genres: Pop rock; pop; electropop
- Length: 39:05
- Label: Island
- Producers: Brandon Flowers; Ariel Rechtshaid

Brandon Flowers chronology
Flamingo (2010)	The Desired Effect (2015)	Thrasher (2026)

Singles from The Desired Effect
- 1. "Can't Deny My Love" Released: March 23, 2015; 2. "Still Want You" Released: April 13, 2015; 3. "Lonely Town" Released: April 27, 2015; 4. "I Can Change" Released: May 4, 2015

The Desired Effect is the second studio album by American singer-songwriter Brandon Flowers, co-founder of rock group the Killers. It was released on May 15, 2015, by Island Records. It was produced by Ariel Rechtshaid and Flowers and mixed by Alan Moulder. The album debuted at number one on the UK Albums Chart, becoming Flowers' second solo number-one album and sixth overall.

== Background ==
In 2010, Flowers released his debut solo album Flamingo under the production work of Daniel Lanois, Stuart Price, and Brendan O'Brien. Flamingo, a homage to Flowers' hometown of Las Vegas, topped the UK Albums Chart and included a top-10 single on the UK singles chart. Flowers toured internationally in support of the album, receiving rave reviews for his live performances. Flowers then put his solo career on hiatus while he pursued collaborations with the Killers, including the UK number-one album Battle Born.

In February 2015, Flowers released a teaser video on his website as well as a hand written note stating, "May 18, 2015 We will finally achieve The Desired Effect. Ariel and I have been collaborating in the studio, working together in the spirit of conversation, contention, and at long last, Sweet contrition. No one has yet seen or heard the change. But soon, we all will."

== Recording ==
The Desired Effect was recorded primarily at the Killers' studio, Battle Born Studios in Winchester, Nevada. The album was produced by Ariel Rechtshaid and mixed by Alan Moulder. The album features notable musicians including Neil Tennant (Pet Shop Boys), Bruce Hornsby, Tony Levin (Peter Gabriel), Carlos Alomar (David Bowie), Joey Waronker (Beck), Kenny Aronoff (John Mellencamp), Ronnie Vannucci, Jr. (The Killers), Angel Deradoorian (Dirty Projectors), and Danielle Haim (Haim).

== Promotion ==
"Can't Deny My Love" was released as the lead single on March 23, 2015. It also served as an instant download for pre-orders of the album. Flowers released a series of promotional video clips announcing the single. Flowers also released a series of promotional video clips announcing second single "Still Want You". He released the music video exclusively on Vessel.com A lyric video was released for "I Can Change".

Flowers performed "Can't Deny My Love" on The Tonight Show Starring Jimmy Fallon on March 23, 2015. He performed both "Can't Deny My Love" and "Lonely Town" on Jimmy Kimmel Live! on May 7. On May 13, he appeared on The Late Late Show with James Corden to perform "Lonely Town". Two days later, on May 15, Flowers performed "I Can Change" on The Graham Norton Show. On May 20, Flowers performed a set at Maida Vale Studios on BBC Radio 2 Live Session with Jo Whiley; The Desired Effect was featured the record of the week (May 9) Flowers performed "Can't Deny My Love", "Lonely Town", and "Still Want You" on DirecTV's Guitar Center Sessions on May 29, hosted by Nic Harcourt. He performed "Still Want You" on the Strictly Come Dancing results show on November 15.

In March 2015, Flowers announced a European leg of The Desired Effect Tour in promotion of the album. The leg began in Dublin, Ireland on May 19, and moved onto the UK starting in London on May 21. On tour Flowers was joined by guests on stage including Chrissie Hynde of the Pretenders and Bernard Sumner of New Order. In April 2015, Flowers announced a North American solo tour, which ran from July 27 through October 1. He also performed at the Austin City Limits Music Festival and at Life Is Beautiful.

== Critical reception ==
Professional ratings
Aggregate scores
Source	Rating
Metacritic	75/100
Review scores
Source	Rating
AllMusic	4/5 stars
The Daily Telegraph	4/5 stars
Entertainment Weekly	A−
The Guardian	4/5 stars
The Independent	4/5 stars
Pitchfork	5.6/10
Rolling Stone	3.5/5 stars
Spin	7/10

The Desired Effect received critical acclaim from music critics. At Metacritic, which assigns a normalized rating out of 100 to reviews from mainstream critics, the album received an average score of 75, based on 25 reviews. Neil McCormick of The Daily Telegraph called it a "set of perfectly honed pop-rock burnished with immense choruses" and wrote that, "every track offers up a smart blend of snappy lyrics and catchy hooks." Mark Beaumont of NME wrote, "The Desired Effect is a consistently impressive collection." Sarah Jamieson of DIY wrote "Brandon is still very much the star of this show... he's always been at his most comfortable creating huge pop songs and with his last solo effort, he proved to do just that."

Andy Gill of The Independent called it "a series of huge-sounding, stadium-ready pop anthems of undeniable charm." Lewis Corner of Digital Spy called it "an astute and vivid record." Sarah Rodman of The Boston Globe wrote, "The other predicted effect of the album? A desire to play it repeatedly." Darryl Sterdan of the Sarnia Observer wrote, "Worth your time." Rob Sheffield of Rolling Stone wrote, "The Desired Effect is something rare—the best straight-up pop album made by a rock star in recent memory."

The album won the 2015 AML Award in the "Lyrics" category.

=== Accolades ===
Publication	Country	Accolade	Year	Rank
AllMusic	United States	Best of 2015 Favorite Pop Albums	2015	—N/a
Daily Herald	United States	Albums of the (half) year	2015	—N/a
DIY	United Kingdom	The DIY List 2015: The Year In Music (100 Best Albums of 2015)	2015	42
Gigwise	United Kingdom	Gigwise's Albums of the Year	2015	24
Idolator	United States	2015's Best Albums: Idolator Editors Pick Their Favorite 15	2015	8
Los Angeles Times	United States	Best of 2015: 10 Great Pop Albums from 2015	2015	—N/a
Mashable	United States	The 30 Best Albums of 2015	2015	14
NME	United Kingdom	50 New Records You Need to Hear In 2015	2015	—N/a
PopCrush	United States	Best Albums of 2015 (So Far)	2015	3
The San Francisco Examiner	United States	2015's Top Albums	2015	1
Spin	United States	The 25 Best Pop Albums of 2015	2015	16
Stereogum	United States	The 50 Best Albums of 2015 So Far	2015	—N/a
USA Today	United States	The 10 Best Albums of 2015 So Far	2015	4

== Commercial performance ==
The Desired Effect debuted at number one on the UK Albums Chart with first week sales of 31,077 copies, making it Flowers' second solo number-one album and sixth overall, including work by the Killers. In the United States, the album sold the seventh most copies its debut week, but due to the inclusion of streaming data, it charted at number 17. At the mid-year mark, the album was the 38th best-selling album of the year in the UK.

Single "I Can Change" charted on the UK Singles and Irish Singles charts. Singles "Can't Deny My Love" and "Lonely Town" charted on the US Hot Rock Songs chart. The album was certified Gold by the BPI in April 2017.

== Track listing ==
All tracks produced by Ariel Rechtshaid, except "The Way It's Always Been" produced by Brandon Flowers and "Between Me and You" produced by Robert Root.

No.	Title	Writer(s)	Length
1.	"Dreams Come True"	Flowers	4:03
2.	"Can't Deny My Love"	Flowers; Darren Beckett	3:42
3.	"I Can Change"	Flowers; Steve Bronski; Lawrence Cole; Axel Hedfors; Sebastian Ingrosso; James Somerville	4:18
4.	"Still Want You"	Flowers	3:11
5.	"Between Me and You"	Flowers	4:39
6.	"Lonely Town"	Flowers	3:30
7.	"Diggin' Up the Heart"	Flowers	3:49
8.	"Never Get You Right"	Flowers; Taylor Goldsmith; Conor Oberst	3:43
9.	"Untangled Love"	Flowers; Rick Nowels	4:11
10.	"The Way It's Always Been"	Flowers; Benji Lysaght	3:59

Deluxe and Japanese edition bonus tracks
No.	Title	Writer(s)	Length
11.	"The Desired Effect"	Flowers; T. Goldsmith; Griffin Goldsmith	3:46
12.	"Btwn Me 'n U"	Flowers	4:09

Sample credits

- "I Can Change" contains an interpolation from "Smalltown Boy" (1984), as performed by Bronski Beat.

== Personnel ==
Credits adapted from the liner notes of The Desired Effect.

=== Musicians ===
- Brandon Flowers – lead vocals, synthesizers (all tracks); guitar (track 1); piano (track 5); drum programming (track 10)
- Ariel Rechtshaid – programming, synthesizers (tracks 1–9); bass (tracks 1, 4, 7, 9); guitar (tracks 2, 5, 7, 8); drum programming (track 3); string arrangement, brass arrangement (track 6); percussion (track 8)
- Roger Manning Jr. – synthesizers (tracks 1–3, 5–8); clavinet (track 1)
- Benji Lysaght – guitar (tracks 1–3, 7–10); acoustic guitar (tracks 5, 10)
- Carlos Alomar – guitar (track 1)
- Joey Waronker – drums (tracks 1, 2, 4, 5, 7); percussion (tracks 1, 2, 4, 5, 7, 8)
- Angel Deradoorian – background vocals (tracks 1, 2, 4, 5, 7)
- Moonlight Tran – cello (tracks 1, 10)
- Lauren Cordell – violin (tracks 1, 10)
- Tommy King – keyboards (track 2); piano (tracks 5, 8)
- Ethan Farmer – bass (tracks 2, 6, 8)
- Greg Leisz – pedal steel (tracks 2, 6); banjo (track 6)
- Sheree Brown – additional background vocals (track 2); background vocals (tracks 6, 8)
- Jackie Gouche – additional background vocals (track 2); background vocals (tracks 6, 8)
- Akasha Mabry Hendrix – additional background vocals (track 2); background vocals (tracks 6, 8)
- Lynn Mabry – additional background vocals (track 2); background vocals (tracks 6, 8)
- Nate Donmoyer – drum programming, synthesizers (track 3)
- Ted Sablay – acoustic guitar (track 3); bass (track 9)
- Danielle Withers – background vocals (track 3)
- Erica Canales – background vocals (track 3)
- Neil Tennant – additional vocals (track 3)
- Jake Blanton – bass (track 4); background vocals (tracks 7, 9, 10); Hammond B-3 (track 10)
- Darren Beckett – vibraphone (track 4); drums (track 10)
- Jamie Muhoberac – synthesizers (track 5)
- Jason Hill – synthesizers (track 5)
- Bruce Hornsby – piano (tracks 5, 8)
- Tony Levin – bass, Chapman Stick (track 5)
- Danielle Haim – drums (track 6)
- Jeff Driskill – saxophone (tracks 6, 7)
- Robert Hardt – saxophone (tracks 6, 7)
- Eddie Rich – saxophone (tracks 6, 10)
- Isaac Tubb – trumpet (tracks 6, 10)
- Ron Blake aka Ronnie Blake – trumpet, flugelhorn (track 6)
- Stephen Giraldo – trumpet, flugelhorn (track 6)
- Francisco Torres – trombone, bass trombone (track 6)
- Kenny Aronoff – drums (track 8)
- Matt Breunig – guitar (track 9); 12-string guitar (track 10)
- Rick Nowels – piano, Mellotron, bells (track 9)
- Ronnie Vannucci Jr. – drums (track 9)

=== Technical ===
- Ariel Rechtshaid – production, engineering (tracks 1–9); mixing (track 4)
- Brandon Flowers – production (track 10)
- Matt Breunig – engineering (tracks 1, 8, 10)
- Robert Root – engineering (all tracks); mixing (track 10)
- Dave Schiffman – engineering (tracks 1, 2, 4–8)
- Nick Rowe – additional engineering (tracks 1–9)
- Michael Harris – engineering assistance (tracks 1, 2, 4, 6–8); engineering assistance (track 5)
- Christopher Cerullo – studio assistance (tracks 1, 2, 4–8)
- John DeBold – studio assistance (tracks 1, 2, 4–8); engineering assistance (tracks 3, 9)
- Alan Moulder – mixing (tracks 1, 2, 7–9)
- Caesar Edmunds – mix engineering assistance (tracks 1, 2, 7–9)
- Tony Maserati – mixing (track 3)
- Tyler Scott – mix engineering assistance (track 3)
- Jason Hill – engineering (track 4)
- Kevin Killen – mixing (track 5)
- Dave Fridmann – mixing (track 6)
- Michael Fridmann – mix engineering assistance (track 6)
- John Spiker – additional engineering (track 9)
- Stuart Price – engineering (track 10)
- Emily Lazar – mastering
- Chris Allgood – mastering assistance

=== Artwork ===
- Warren Fu – creative direction, design
- Todd Russell – design
- Williams + Hirakawa – photography

== Charts ==
=== Weekly charts ===
Chart (2015)	Peak position
Australian Albums (ARIA)	14
Austrian Albums (Ö3 Austria)	56
Belgian Albums (Ultratop Flanders)	15
Belgian Albums (Ultratop Wallonia)	28
Canadian Albums (Billboard)	7
Dutch Albums (Album Top 100)	16
German Albums (Offizielle Top 100)	37
Irish Albums (IRMA)	2
Italian Albums (FIMI)	84
Mexican Albums (AMPROFON)	15
New Zealand Albums (RMNZ)	21
Norwegian Albums (VG-lista)	33
Scottish Albums (Official Charts)	1
Spanish Albums (Promusicae)	19
Swiss Albums (Schweizer Hitparade)	36
UK Albums (Official Charts)	1
US Billboard 200	17
US Top Alternative Albums (Billboard)	3
US Top Rock Albums (Billboard)	3

=== Year-end charts ===
Chart (2015)	Position
UK Albums (OCC)	70

== Certifications ==
Region	Certification	Certified units/sales
United Kingdom (BPI)	Gold	100,000^{‡}
^{‡} Sales+streaming figures based on certification alone.

== Release history ==
Region	Date	Format(s)	Edition(s)	Label
Ireland	May 15, 2015	CD; LP; digital download	Standard	Island
United Kingdom	May 18, 2015	CD; LP; digital download	Standard	Island
United States	May 19, 2015	CD; LP; digital download	Standard	Island
