= I Can Change (Brandon Flowers song) =

Single by Brandon Flowers

from the album The Desired Effect
- Released: May 5, 2015
- Recorded: 2014
- Studio: Battle Born Studios (Winchester, Nevada)
- Genre: Synth-pop; new wave
- Length: 4:19
- Label: Island
- Songwriters: Brandon Flowers; Steve Bronski; Larry Steinbacheck; James Somerville; Axel Hedfors; Sebastian Ingrosso
- Producer: Ariel Rechtshaid

Brandon Flowers singles chronology
"Lonely Town" (2015)	"I Can Change" (2015)	"Plans" (2026)

Lyric video
- "I Can Change" on YouTube

"I Can Change" is the fourth single by American singer-songwriter Brandon Flowers from his second studio album, The Desired Effect.

== Background and composition ==
The song contains elements from "Smalltown Boy" (1984) by Bronski Beat. Brandon Flowers wrote "I Can Change" upon request from Swedish house duo Axwell and Ingrosso, who asked if Flowers would collaborate with them for their upcoming album. Because Axwell and Ingrosso were unable to finish the song, Flowers decided to record it himself. He noticed similarities between the song he had been given by Axwell and Ingrosso and Bronski Beat's "Smalltown Boy" and thus decided to sample the melody from it. Coincidentally, Flowers later learned that Axwell previously sampled "Smalltown Boy" together with Steve Angello for their 2006 single "Tell Me Why".

"I Can Change" features a vocal recording by Neil Tennant of the Pet Shop Boys, taken via a cell phone answering machine. Flowers has said of the recording: "We just talked about it, and we just had this gap in a verse and we needed to stick something in there. We were talking about it being a speaking part, and the greatest musical 'speaker' is Neil Tennant! His voice is like no other. I texted him if he would — he didn't even hear the song or the tempo or anything, I just texted him this line. I asked, will you send us a voicemail of yourself saying, 'When you're looking for a change'? And that was it. He sent us a voice memo, and we stuck it onto the track, from the phone. It was done within 20 seconds."

=== Reception ===
Billboard listed it as one of "20 Summer Pop Songs You Need for Your Summer Playlist".

Flowers performed this track on The Graham Norton Show and at the Royal Variety Performance (2015) at Royal Albert Hall.

== Track listing ==
Digital download
No.	Title	Writer(s)	Producer(s)	Length
1.	"I Can Change"	Brandon Flowers; Steve Bronski; Lawrence Cole; James Somerville; Axel Hedfors; Sebastian Ingrosso	Ariel Rechtshaid	4:19

Digital download – remix
No.	Title	Producer(s)	Length
1.	"I Can Change" (Michael Brun remix)	Ariel Rechtshaid	3:44

Digital download – remix
No.	Title	Producer(s)	Length
1.	"I Can Change" (Kill Them With Colour remix)	Ariel Rechtshaid	3:50

== Credits and personnel ==
- Brandon Flowers – songwriter, lead vocals, synthesizer
- Steve Bronski – songwriter
- Lawrence Cole – songwriter
- James Somerville – songwriter
- Axel Hedfors – songwriter
- Sebastian Ingrosso – songwriter
- Ariel Rechtshaid – producer, programming, drum programming, synthesizer
- Roger Joseph Manning, Jr. – synthesizer
- Nate Donmoyer – drum programming, synthesizer
- Benji Lysaght – guitar
- Ted Sablay – acoustic guitar
- Tony Maserati – mixer
- Neil Tennant – additional vocals
- Erica Canales – backing vocals
- Danielle Withers – backing vocals
- Emily Lazar – mastering
- Chris Allgood – assistant mastering

Credits adapted from The Desired Effect liner notes.

== Charts ==
Chart (2015)	Peak position
Belgium (Ultratop 50 Wallonia)	45
Ireland (IRMA)	70
UK Singles (Official Charts)	52

== Accolades ==
Publication	Country	Accolade	Year	Rank
NPR	United States	The Complete List: NPR Music's Favorite Songs Of 2015 (So Far)	2015	N/A
411 Mania	United States	411's Top 200 Tracks Of 2015	2015	86
