= Can't Deny My Love =

Single by Brandon Flowers

from the album The Desired Effect
- Released: March 24, 2015
- Recorded: 2014
- Studio: Battle Born Studios (Winchester, Nevada)
- Genre: Synth-pop; power rock
- Length: 3:42
- Songwriters: Brandon Flowers; Darren Beckett
- Producers: Ariel Rechtshaid; Brandon Flowers

Brandon Flowers singles chronology
"Jilted Lovers & Broken Hearts" (2011)	"Can't Deny My Love" (2015)	"Still Want You" (2015)

Music video
- "Can't Deny My Love" on YouTube

"Can't Deny My Love" is the lead single by American singer-songwriter Brandon Flowers from his second studio album, The Desired Effect.

== Composition ==
Flowers asked drummer Darren Beckett for a beat, Beckett obliged and Flowers then wrote the song using one of the recorded beats Beckett sent him.

== Promotion ==
The single debuted on Annie Mac's show on BBC Radio 1 on March 23, 2015. Flowers performed "Can't Deny My Love" for the first time on The Tonight Show Starring Jimmy Fallon the same evening.

== Music video ==
In promotion of the video, Flowers's YouTube channel released a series of clips featuring a walking traveler carrying a flame.

The music video was inspired by the 1835 Puritan short story "Young Goodman Brown" by Nathaniel Hawthorne. Flowers plays the protagonist who leaves his wife played by actress Evan Rachel Wood for an unknown errand in the desert despite her pleas that he stay. On his journey he meets a man with a black staff played by Richard Butler (of the Psychedelic Furs). Soon he discovers a group of townspeople assembled in robes carrying out witchcraft like ceremonies and discovers his wife among them. The townspeople notice him but as they approach the scene instantly vanishes and he awakes uncertain whether the previous night's events were real or a dream. He passes by several of the townspeople and returns to his wife. Originally, M. Night Shyamalan was expected to direct the video in the Northeast but at the last second Robert Schober was asked to film the video in Calico, San Bernardino County, California.

== Reception ==
=== Critical ===
"Can't Deny My Love" was met with very positive reception upon its release. PopJustice gave the song a positive review describing it as "Haim meets Pet Shop Boys meets The Killers" and added "it's really amazing so tune in". Digital Spy gave it five stars out of five calling it, "big, bold, and quite possibly one of the best songs Flowers has sung on this decade." Rolling Stone described the song and track "Dreams Come True" as "triumphant new songs" and reported that, "Whatever it is, it's working." Music Times also gave the song a positive review calling it "a glowing effort of what a new solo single could be – it's fitting in the 2015 pop landscape all while maintaining the very thing that makes Flowers a unique presence in music over a decade into his career." Gigwise reported that "it confirms why The Desired Effect is one of our most anticipated records of the year". DIY calls it "an instant pop fix, one of the most upfront, immediate tricks Flowers has pulled in his career to date." Billboard also gave it very positive reviews, calling it "excellent".

Following its release, "Can't Deny My Love" became Spotify's No. 1 Most Viral Track in the United Kingdom and Canada as well as the No. 2 Most Viral Track globally.

== Track listing ==
Digital download
No.	Title	Writer(s)	Producer(s)	Length
1.	"Can't Deny My Love"	Brandon Flowers; Darren Beckett	Ariel Rechtshaid	3:42

Digital download – remix
No.	Title	Writer(s)	Producer(s)	Length
1.	"Can't Deny My Love" (Gosh Father & Jinco remix)	Brandon Flowers; Darren Beckett	Ariel Rechtshaid	3:57

== Charts ==
Chart (2015)	Peak position
UK Official Download Chart Top 100	60
US Alternative Airplay (Billboard)	39
US Hot Rock & Alternative Songs (Billboard)	30

== Accolades ==
Publication	Country	Accolade	Year	Rank
Esquire	United States	The 40 Songs You Need to Hear for Summer 2015	2015	N/A
Idolator	United States	The 20 Best Pop Songs Of 2015: Idolator Editors Pick Their Favorites	2015	4
