= Lonely Town (Brandon Flowers song) =

Single by Brandon Flowers

from the album The Desired Effect
- Released: April 27, 2015
- Recorded: 2014
- Studio: Battle Born Studios (Winchester, Nevada)
- Genre: Synth-rock
- Length: 3:31
- Label: Island
- Songwriter: Brandon Flowers
- Producer: Ariel Rechtshaid

Brandon Flowers singles chronology
"Still Want You" (2015)	"Lonely Town" (2015)	"I Can Change" (2015)

Music video
- "Lonely Town" on YouTube

"Lonely Town" is a song by American singer Brandon Flowers from his second studio album, The Desired Effect (2015). It was released on April 27, 2015, as the album's third single.

== Composition ==
Sonically the track appears to be a breezy love song but lyrically it features lines with dual meanings (e.g., "When will you come home again? Did you lock the door when it shut?"), potentially attributable to a stalker.

Danielle Haim (of Haim) requested to play the drum part and features on the recording.

== Music video ==
The music video for "Lonely Town" centers around a young woman (Penelope Mitchell) who is moving around a house with headphones on while dancing to the song. It is presumed that she is a guest in this house. Someone is watching her from outside her window. The video is retro-styled.

== Charts ==
Chart (2015)	Peak position
US Hot Rock & Alternative Songs (Billboard)	47
