= Libera Award for Best Breakthrough Artist =

Annual US music award

- Country: United States
- Presented by: American Association of Independent Music (A2IM)
- First award: 2012
- Currently held by: Sudan Archives (2023)
- Website: liberaawards.com

The Libera Award for Best Breakthrough Artist is an award presented by the American Association of Independent Music at the annual Libera Award which recognizes "independent artist whose release exceeded a certain total of streams or equivalent sales" since 2012. The category was previously called Up & Comer Award in 2012 to 2014.

For the first two years of the awards, the category had two winners, one voted by A2IM members and the other voted by eMusic members. Indie pop band The Dø and Indie soul band JC Brooks & the Uptown Sound were the inaugural recipients of the award. Since 2013, a set of nominees is annually presented, with the nomination sometimes being credited for a specific release.

== Winners and nominees ==
Year	Winner(s)	Work	Nominees	Ref.
2012	The Dø (Note: Voted by A2IM members.)	—N/a	—N/a	
2012	JC Brooks & the Uptown Sound (Note: Voted by eMusic members.)	—N/a	—N/a	
2013	Mikal Cronin	—N/a	Air Dubai; Boy; Leogun; MNDR	
2013	The Virginmarys	—N/a	Air Dubai; Boy; Leogun; MNDR	
2014	Angel Olsen (Up & Comer Artist Award)	Burn Your Fire for No Witness	Alpine – A is for Alpine; FKA Twigs – EP2; Lo-Fang – Blue Film; Mandolin Orange – This Side of Jordan; The Strypes – Blue Collar Jane EP	
2014	Chvrches (Breakthrough Artist)	The Bones of What You Believe	Cécile McLorin Salvant – WomanChild; Hurray for the Riff Raff – Small Town Heroes; Mikal Cronin – MCII; Savages – Silence Yourself; The Front Bottoms – Talon of the Hawk; Valerie June – Pushin' Against a Stone; William Onyeabor – Who is William Onyeabor?	
2015	Sturgill Simpson	—N/a	Alvvays; Chet Faker; Kygo; Mac DeMarco; MisterWives; Viet Cong	
2016	Courtney Barnett	Sometimes I Sit and Think, and Sometimes I Just Sit	Hop Along – Painted Shut; Julien Baker – Sprained Ankle; Kamasi Washington – The Epic; Nathaniel Rateliff & the Night Sweats – Nathaniel Rateliff & the Night Sweats; Shamir – Ratchet; Tobias Jesso Jr. – Goon	
2017	Whitney	Light Upon the Lake	Delicate Steve – This Is Steve; The Lemon Twigs – Do Hollywood; Margaret Glaspy – Emotions and Math; Margo Price – Midwest Farmer's Daughter; Roosevelt – Roosevelt; Young M.A – Ooouuu	
2018	Princess Nokia	1992 Deluxe	Alice Merton – No Roots; Jamila Woods – Heavn; Power Trip – Nightmare Logic; Trippie Redd – A Love Letter to You	
2019	Idles	Joy as an Act of Resistance	Caroline Rose – Loner; Lucy Dacus – Historian; Snail Mail – Lush; Sunflower Bean – Come for Me	
2020	Orville Peck		Sudan Archives; Black Pumas; Fontaines D.C.; Julia Jacklin	
2021	Arlo Parks		Bonny Light Horseman; Overcoats; Arlo McKinley; Orion Sun	
2022	Wet Leg	"Chaise Longue"	Black Country, New Road – For the First Time; Girl in Red – If I Could Make It Go Quiet; Japanese Breakfast – Jubilee; Mdou Moctar – Afrique Victime	
2023	Sudan Archives		Allison Russell; Charlotte Sands; Soul Glo; The Linda Lindas	
2024	Blondshell		BAMBII; bar Italia; Indigo De Souza; Say She She; Slow Pulp; Wednesday	
2025	MJ Lenderman		Jessica Pratt; Magdalena Bay; Mannequin Pussy; Mk.gee; Shaboozey	
