= Bonny Light Horseman =

Bonny Light Horseman may refer to:

- "Bonny Light Horseman" (song), a traditional folk song
- Bonny Light Horseman (band), an American folk supergroup formed in 2019
  - Bonny Light Horseman (album), the 2020 debut album by the band

== See also ==
- My Bonny Light Horseman, a 2008 novel by L. A. Meyer
