= Eric D. Johnson =

American musician (born 1976)

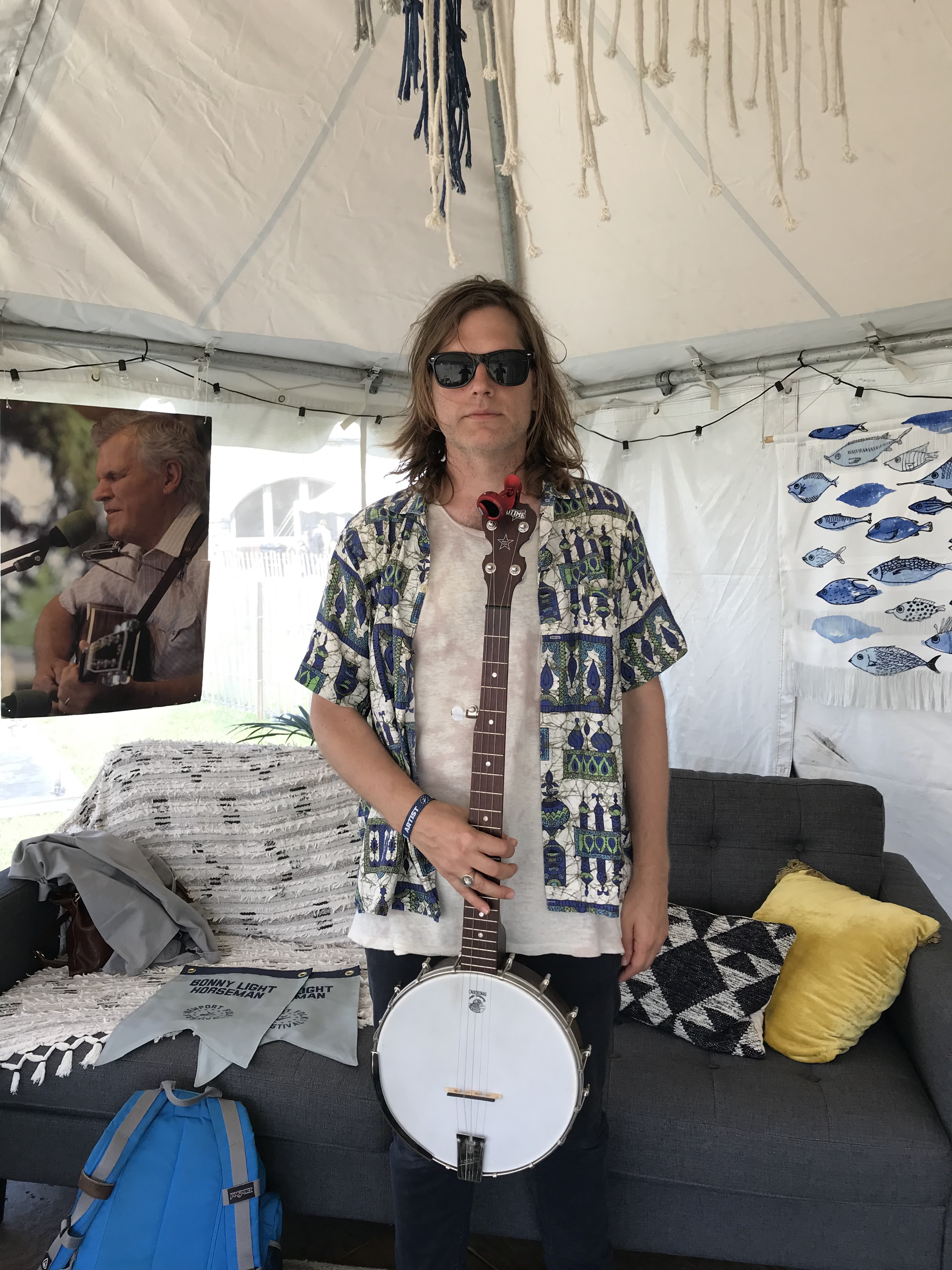
- Eric D. Johnson at Newport Folk Festival, 2019

Background information
- Also known as: EDJ
- Born: June 7, 1976 (age 50)
- Origin: Chicago, Illinois, United States
- Genres: Folk rock, alternative country, indie rock
- Years active: 1997–present
- Labels: Perishable Records, Sub Pop, Easy Sound Recording Company, Merge Records
- Website: www.ericdjohnsonmusic.com

Eric Donald Johnson (born June 7, 1976) is an American singer-songwriter, composer and multi-instrumentalist. He is best known as the leader and sole permanent member of the influential folk-rock band Fruit Bats, and for his tenure as a member of The Shins. He has also scored films, most notably Our Idiot Brother and Smashed.

In 2019, Johnson formed the folk group Bonny Light Horseman, alongside Anaïs Mitchell and multi-instrumentalist Josh Kaufman.

== Early life ==
Johnson moved around the Midwest as a child and spent his adolescent and teenage years in Chicago’s Western Suburbs. He planned on becoming a filmmaker or screenwriter but discovered an interest in songwriting after joining a local band in high school.

Johnson did not attend college but instead moved to Chicago and became involved with the local music scene there, getting a job at the Old Town School of Folk Music where he taught classes and worked as a house manager for concerts.

== Career ==
=== Pre-Fruit Bats ===
In the late 1990’s, Johnson fronted an indie-rock band called I Rowboat. In early 2000, he became a member of the experimental folk-rock group Califone. It was on tour with Califone that he befriended the members of Modest Mouse and The Shins, who took an interest in Fruit Bats and made an introduction to the record label Sub Pop.

=== Fruit Bats (2001-2013 hiatus) ===
Fruit Bats signed to Sub Pop in 2002 and became part of the label's early 2000s folk-rock boom. They would go on to record four records on the label.

They played at festivals such as Sasquatch Festival, Bonnaroo Music Festival, and Le Guess Who, and made TV appearances on Last Call with Carson Daly and The Late Late Show with Craig Ferguson.

Fruit Bats' 2003 song "When U Love Somebody" was featured in the film Youth in Revolt, and has been covered by bands such as The Decemberists, Said the Whale, and Guster.

In November 2013, Johnson announced he would be dissolving Fruit Bats. They played what was to be their farewell show at the Aladdin Theater in Portland, Oregon on November 16, 2013.

=== Fruit Bats (reformation in 2015-present) ===
In 2014, Johnson released an album under the name EDJ. The subsequent release was not a commercial success, and was later described by Johnson as a “career stalling move.”

In 2015, My Morning Jacket invited Johnson to open a tour with his EDJ project, and instead Johnson opted to re-form Fruit Bats to do the tour. This led to the album Absolute Loser, which featured the popular single “Humbug Mountain Song.”

In 2018, Fruit Bats signed to Merge Records and the following year released their seventh studio album Gold Past Life, of which Variety wrote, “there won’t be many albums in 2019 with as many quotable, cut-to-the-marrow lines as this one has.”

In 2020, they released The Pet Parade, which was recorded remotely during the COVID-19 pandemic with producer (and Johnson’s Bonny Light Horseman bandmate) Josh Kaufman. That same year, Johnson recorded a full-album cover of Smashing Pumpkins’ 1993 album Siamese Dream.

In early 2021, Fruit Bats made their first network television performance since 2009, performing on Late Night With Seth Meyers.

=== The Shins (2006-2011) ===
Johnson joined The Shins in late 2006, after joining the band in the studio for their third studio album, Wincing the Night Away (2007). He was a member of the band until 2011, and made appearances on Saturday Night Live, The Tonight Show, and Late Night With Conan O’Brien.

Johnson left the band in 2011 due to scheduling conflicts with Fruit Bats, and went on to appear on several tracks on their fourth studio album, Port of Morrow. Johnson briefly reappeared with the band for their set at the Bonnaroo Festival in June 2012.

=== Bonny Light Horseman ===
The band first came together at the Eaux Claires festival in 2018 when invited by the festivals co-founders Justin Vernon (of Bon Iver) and Aaron Dessner (of The National). From the early sessions for this performance, the trio decided to form the band in a more official capacity. Their self-titled debut album was released on January 25, 2020. The album contains a mixture of traditional British folk songs and original material. It was subsequently nominated for the Grammy Award for Best Folk Album as well as the Grammy Award for Best American Roots Performance for the track "Deep in Love." The album was awarded Best Americana Record at the 2021 Libera Awards and was also nominated for the Libera Award for Best Breakthrough Artist. The group's sophomore album, Rolling Golden Holy, was released in October 2022. Singles "California" and "Summer Dream" were released in advance of the album. Unlike the group's debut, Rolling Golden Holy comprises all original material.

=== Film work ===
In 2010 Johnson was hired to score Max Winkler's comedy Ceremony, starring Uma Thurman and Michael Angarano. Later that year he worked on director Jesse Peretz’s feature Our Idiot Brother, starring Paul Rudd, which premiered at the Sundance Film Festival in 2011. Johnson co-scored the film with Nathan Larson, and also wrote and produced three original songs for the soundtrack, as well as contributing a cover of "Tie a Yellow Ribbon Round the Ole Oak Tree." In 2013 Johnson collaborated with Vetiver front man Andy Cabic on scores for two critically lauded Sundance features - one for the dramedy Smashed and the other for the documentary After Tiller.

In 2012 Johnson collaborated with Andy Cabic of Vetiver on the music for the critically lauded Sundance feature Smashed, a score which landed on the Academy Awards’ shortlist for that year.

In 2016 Johnson scored director Rod Blackhurst’s feature debut Here Alone, which won the Tribeca Film Festival’s audience award. The following year saw Johnson scoring the comedy feature Spivak for Netflix.

Johnson has occasionally appeared as an actor, most notably a cameo as a Grateful Dead cover band member in Jean-Marc Vallée’s 2014 drama Wild. He also provided voices for various characters in the cartoon pilot E Coli High which premiered on IFC Selects, as well as the voiceover for TurboTax’s Super Bowl Ad in 2021.

=== Live appearances and festival production ===
In 2010 Johnson founded the Huichica Music Festival along with Jeff Bundschu, owner of Gundlach Bundschu winery. The festival is held on the grounds of Gundlach Bundschu winery in Sonoma, California. Produced and curated by Johnson, the festival has frequently featured not only sets from Fruit Bats, but also acts such as Jonathan Wilson, Hand Habits, Robyn Hitchcock, Lee Fields, Real Estate, Love, Shannon and the Clams, Silver Apples, Tara Jane O'Neil, Bob Weir, and many more. Johnson stopped working with the festival in 2020.

In November 2012 at San Francisco’s Warfield Theatre, Johnson performed Van Morrison’s songs from The Last Waltz in a recreation of The Band’s 1976 farewell concert of the same name. He reprised this role for several subsequent appearances at The Capitol Theater in Port Chester, NY.

In 2018, Johnson curated and produced a set at Newport Folk Festival called Beneath the Sacred Mountain: A Cosmic American Revue with support from The Spacebomb House Band, Phil Cook, Josh Kaufman, Matthew E. White, James Mercer (The Shins), The Watson Twins, Laura Veirs, Hiss Golden Messenger, Bedouine, and Lucius.

In 2019, Johnson appeared as part of Newport Folk Festival’s If I Had a Song covers set, performing Crosby Stills and Nash’s “Suite: Judy Blue Eyes” along with Robin Pecknold of Fleet Foxes, James Mercer of The Shins, and Judy Collins.

A longtime Deadhead, Johnson has appeared several times as a guest on several Grateful Dead related projects. In August 2019 he joined Joe Russo’s Almost Dead for several songs at Los Angeles’ Greek Theatre, he joined JRAD for several songs in July 2021 at their Westville Music Bowl concert in New Haven, Connecticut. In October 2023, Fruit Bats opened for JRAD, with all members of JRAD backing him, at the Frost Amphitheater on the campus of Stanford University and at Los Angeles’ Greek Theatre. He also sat in during the main JRAD set on several songs during both aforementioned concerts. Previously, in October 2021, he played three shows with the original bass player of the Grateful Dead, Phil Lesh, at The Capitol Theatre in Port Chester, New York as part of Phil Lesh and Friends.

== Personal life ==
Johnson has been in a relationship since 2004 with Annie Beedy, an artist and permaculture landscape designer. They were married in 2011. Johnson describes himself as having a "slightly nomadic childhood and… a nomadic adulthood, too." A Chicago native, Johnson has lived in Seattle, Portland, and, as of 2017, Los Angeles.

== Awards and nominations ==
Year	Organization	Work	Award	Result	Ref
2021	Grammy Awards	Bonny Light Horseman	Best Folk Album	Nominated	
2021	Grammy Awards	Bonny Light Horseman	Best American Roots Performance	Nominated	
2021	Libera Awards	Bonny Light Horseman	Best Americana Album	Won	

== Selected discography ==
Fruit Bats (studio albums)

- Echolocation (Perishable, 2001)
- Mouthfuls (Sub Pop, 2003)
- Spelled in Bones (Sub Pop, 2005)
- The Ruminant Band (Sub Pop, 2009)
- Tripper (Sub Pop, 2011)
- Absolute Loser (Easy Sound, 2016)
- Gold Past Life (Merge Records, 2019)
- Siamese Dream (Turntable Kitchen/Merge Records, 2020)
- The Pet Parade (Merge Records, 2021)
- A River Running To Your Heart (Merge Records, 2023)
- Baby Man (Merge Records, 2025)
- The Landfill (Merge Records, 2026)

Fruit Bats (compilations and live albums)

- Tragedy Plus Time Equals Fruit Bats (St. Ives, 2004)
- The Glory of Fruit Bats (Easy Sound, 2016)
- Live at Pickathon (Easy Sound, 2016)
- In Real Life: Live at Spacebomb (Spacebomb, 2019)
- Found a Round Stone: Live in Portland (Merge Records, 2020)
- Sometimes a Cloud is Just a Cloud (Merge Records, 2022)
- Starry-eyed, in Stereo (Merge Records, 2024)

Bonny Light Horseman

- Bonny Light Horseman (37d03d, 2020)
- Rolling Golden Holy (37d03d, 2022)
- Keep Me on Your Mind/See You Free (Jagjaguwar, 2024)

EDJ

- EDJ (Easy Sound, 2014)

I, Rowboat

- self-titled (self-released, 1999)

Other appearances

- Califone - Roomsound (Perishable, 2001)
- Sally Timms - In the World of Him (Touch and Go, 2004)
- The Shins - Wincing the Night Away (Sub Pop, 2007)
- Vetiver - Tight Knit (Sub Pop, 2009)
- Vetiver - The Errant Charm (Sub Pop, 2011)
- Our Idiot Brother - Original Soundtrack Album (ABKCO, 2011)
- The Shins - Port of Morrow (Columbia, 2012)
- Matt Berry - Kill the Wolf (Acid Jazz, 2013)
- Nina Persson - Animal Heart (Universal, 2014)
- Nathaniel Rateliff & The Night Sweats - Nathaniel Rateliff & The Night Sweats (Concord, 2015)
- Various Artists - Day of the Dead (4AD, 2016)
- Jim James - Eternally Even (ATO, 2016)
- Kacey Johansing - The Hiding (Night Bloom, 2017)
- Anna Ternheim - A Space For Lost Time (BMG, 2019)
- Vetiver - Up On High (Easy Sound, 2019)
- CARM - April (37d03d, 2021)
- SunYears - Come Fetch My Soul! (Yep Roc, 2023)
- Blitzen Trapper - 100's of 1000's, Millions of Billions (Yep Roc, 2024)
- Matt Berry - Heard Noises (Acid Jazz, 2025)
