= Look for Your Mind! =

Studio album by the Lemon Twigs
- Released: May 8, 2026
- Studios: The Vegetable Attic, Brooklyn
- Genres: Power pop; psychedelic rock
- Length: 41:06
- Label: Captured Tracks
- Producer: The Lemon Twigs

The Lemon Twigs chronology
A Dream Is All We Know (2024)	Look for Your Mind! (2026)

Brian D’Addario chronology
Till the Morning (2025)	Look for Your Mind! (2026)

Singles from Look for Your Mind!
- 1. "I Just Can't Get Over Losing You" Released: March 11, 2026; 2. "2 or 3" Released: April 8, 2026

Look for Your Mind! is the sixth studio album by the Lemon Twigs released on May 8, 2026. As with most of the band's previous albums, members Brian and Michael D'Addario produced the album themselves.

The album was preceded by the singles "I Just Can't Get Over Losing You" on March 11, 2026, and "2 or 3", released on April 8, 2026.

== Composition and recording ==
The album was recorded mainly at the D'Addario brothers' studio in Brooklyn to 16-track tape. Compared with the predecessor album, A Dream Is All We Know (on which the D'Addarios played almost all the instruments), Look for Your Mind! features a slightly broader cast, with backing on some tracks from Lemon Twigs touring members Danny Ayala and Reza Matin, as well as Tchotchke bassist Eva Chambers (who also designed the album's cover art). Several of the tracks were originally arranged for live shows, giving many of the tracks a more "live" sound than on previous Twigs records. They also chose a sonic palette drawing heavily on electric guitars, building on one of the final songs they recorded for their previous album, "My Golden Years".

The Irish Times describes the album as "a collection of lush power-pop nuggets full of bright melodies and dark lyrics that touch on such diverse topics as heartbreak and the rise of the surveillance state." Michael D'Addario also cited Irish folk as a key influence on songs such as "Fire and Gold". Brian D'Addario compared his surf rock–infused "Bring You Down" to Eddie Cochran's "Summertime Blues" in its telling of a downtrodden worker mistreated by "the man". Album closer "Your True Enemy" features psychedelic analog sound effects, such as flanging, vocals processed through a Leslie speaker, and backwards tapes.

== Critical reception ==
Professional ratings
Aggregate scores
Source	Rating
AnyDecentMusic?	7.6/10
Metacritic	84/100
Review scores
Source	Rating
AllMusic	4/5 stars
Classic Rock	4/5 stars
Mojo	4/5 stars
Record Collector	4/5 stars

Metacritic assigned the album a weighted score of 84, indicating "universal acclaim". AllMusic cited the inclusion of the band's touring rhythm section as giving "a new immediacy and the feel of a band rocking out together. ... The performances remain airtight and the song construction is as intricate and involved as any of their previous work, keeping them the most intelligent and infallible bands making power pop in the 2020s." A laudatory review in Record Collector deemed Look for Your Mind as "another winner from the d'Addarios, packed tight with stunning musicianship, sparkling songcraft and ingenious arrangements. Let's see AI try to match this." Clash noted the Twigs' sound "feels renewed, broadened, moving away from the Beach Boys influence towards more of a power-pop and new wave inflection. ... One of the group's strongest works to date." MusicOMH rated the album 3.5 stars, writing, "At their best, they're untouchably brilliant but on this outing they haven't quite been able to maintain the elevated standard established early on over the course of the full album."

== Track listing ==
All tracks are written by the Lemon Twigs.

Look for Your Mind! track listing
No.	Title	Lead vocals	Length
1.	"Look for Your Mind"	Michael	2:18
2.	"2 or 3"	Brian	3:27
3.	"Nothin' But You"	Michael	3:34
4.	"Gather Round"	Brian	3:01
5.	"I Just Can't Get Over Losing You"	Michael	2:07
6.	"Fire and Gold"	Brian	3:30
7.	"Mean to Me"	Michael	3:15
8.	"Bring You Down"	Brian	2:48
9.	"Yeah I Do"	Michael	1:54
10.	"I Hurt You"	Brian	2:52
11.	"You're Still My Girl"	Michael	2:15
12.	"Joy"	Brian	3:04
13.	"My Heart Is in Your Hands Tonight"	Michael	3:12
14.	"Your True Enemy"	Brian	3:49
Total length:			41:06

== Personnel ==
From the Look for Your Mind! liner notes, except noted

=== The Lemon Twigs ===
- Brian D'Addario – vocals; drums (tracks 1–5, 7, 10, 14), bass guitar (tracks 1, 2, 4, 5, 7, 9, 10, 13, 14), lead guitar (tracks 1–3, 8, 10, 14), baritone guitar (tracks 1, 6), tambourine (tracks 1, 11), 12-string guitar (tracks 2, 6, 8, 11), acoustic guitar (tracks 2, 10), percussion (tracks 2, 3), bells (tracks 2, 4), harpsichord (tracks 2, 12), guitar (tracks 3, 6), piano, mandolin (track 4), tanpura (tracks 6, 12), 12-string acoustic guitar (track 6), organ (tracks 7, 14), clavinet, sleigh bells (track 7), synthesizers (tracks 10, 12), marimba, wurlitzer piano (track 10), classical guitar (track 12), cello (track 14)
- Michael D'Addario – vocals; 12-string guitar (tracks 1, 5, 7), lead guitar (tracks 1, 3), acoustic guitar (tracks 3, 11), guitar (tracks 5, 7–9, 11, 13), bass guitar (track 6), percussion (track 12)

=== Additional musicians ===
- Kana Fukushima – flute (tracks 2, 4, 12)
- Kana Miyamoto – piccolo (track 2), flute (tracks 4, 12), trumpet (track 4), violin (track 12)
- Santosh Sharma – tenor & baritone saxophone (track 2)
- Shaleah Feinstein – violin (tracks 2, 12)
- Clara Cho – cello (tracks 2, 12)
- Eva Chambers – bass guitar (tracks 3, 5), backing vocals (track 5)
- Anastasia Sanchez – backing vocals (track 4)
- Cameron Carrella – trumpet, euphonium, tuba, flugelhorn (track 4)
- Jasper Dutz – clarinet (tracks 4, 12)
- Susan Hall – backing vocals (track 4)
- Reza Matin – drums (tracks 6, 8, 9, 11, 13), backing vocals (tracks 8, 11)
- Paul D. Millar – percussion (track 6), effects (track 14)
- Danny Ayala – backing vocals (tracks 7, 8, 11), bass guitar (tracks 8, 11)
- Sandra Bouissou – violin (track 12)
- Elli Shannon – french horn (track 12)
- Jillian Horn – oboe (track 12)
- Carlos Walker – viola (track 12)
- Ronnie D'Addario – effects, backing vocals (track 14)

=== Additional work ===
- The Lemon Twigs – producer, mixing, engineer
- Paul D. Millar – maintenance engineering, mastering
- Scott Hull – mastering
- Sammy Weissberg – orchestra arrangements (track 12)
- Eva Chambers – cover art, art direction, and photography

== Charts ==
Chart performance for Look for Your Mind!
Chart (2026)	Peak position
French Physical Albums (SNEP)	59
French Rock & Metal Albums (SNEP)	10
Japanese Albums (Oricon)	39
Japanese Rock Albums (Oricon)	6
Japanese Top Albums Sales (Billboard Japan)	39
Scottish Albums (Official Charts)	24
Swedish Physical Albums (Sverigetopplistan)	17
UK Albums Sales (OCC)	27
UK Independent Albums (Official Charts)	12
