= Keep Me on Your Mind/See You Free =

Studio album by Bonny Light Horseman
- Released: June 7, 2024
- Studio: Levis Corner House, Ballydehob, Ireland; Dreamland Recording Studios, West Hurley, New York
- Genre: Folk
- Length: 63:16
- Label: Jagjaguwar
- Producer: Josh Kaufman

Bonny Light Horseman chronology
Rolling Golden Holy (2022)	Keep Me on Your Mind/See You Free (2024)

Keep Me on Your Mind/See You Free is the third studio album by folk supergroup Bonny Light Horseman, released on June 7, 2024, through Jagjaguwar. It received positive reviews from critics.

== Writing and recording ==
The album was written over the span of five months. Most of the album was recorded at the Levis Corner House pub in Ballydehob, Ireland, with additional recording taking place in New York.

== Critical reception ==
Professional ratings
Aggregate scores
Source	Rating
Metacritic	85/100
Review scores
Source	Rating
AllMusic	3.5/5 stars
Exclaim!	8/10
Mojo	4/5 stars
Paste	7.9/10
Uncut	9/10

According to the review aggregator Metacritic, Keep Me on Your Mind/See You Free received "universal acclaim" based on a weighted average score of 85 out of 100 from 7 critic scores.

Reviewing the album for AllMusic, Mark Deming called it "state-of-the-art contemporary pop-folk", and felt that "with each LP Bonny Light Horseman deliver stronger work; deciding to put their songwriting chops to work may be the smartest thing they've done to date." Mojo commented that "Bonny Light Horseman probably could've said just as much over half the tracks, but the fact they had the courage to keep digging ever deeper into their emotional turbulence has bourne spectacular results", while Uncut felt that "only a couple of tracks into Bonny Light Horseman's third album, it's clear this is something special. Beauty erupts from the vocal harmonies of Eric Johnson and Anais Mitchell, who lift the Technicolor folk-rock of 'Lover Take It Easy' into something close to heaven. And then it keeps getting better".

Eric R. Danton of Paste wrote that there is "scarcely a dud among the 18 songs", and that, "though the album feels long at 63 minutes, Johnson, Kaufman and Mitchell fill that time with reflections on longing, growing older and a pastoral kind of life—all rendered in the soft light and lengthening shadows of a late summer afternoon fading toward evening". Reviewing the album for Exclaim!, Anthony Boire concluded that "the few moments of experimentation are outweighed by an assured grasp of traditional instrumentation, and it works out for the better. This is a well-travelled band firing on all cylinders."

=== Year-end lists ===
Select year-end rankings for Keep Me On Your Mind/See You Free
Publication/critic	Accolade	Rank	Ref.
BBC Radio 6 Music	26 Albums of the Year 2024	-	
Rough Trade UK	Albums of the Year 2024	74	
Uncut	80 Best Albums of 2024	53	

== Track listing ==
All tracks are written by Anaïs Mitchell, Josh Kaufman, and Eric D. Johnson, except where noted.

Keep Me on Your Mind/See You Free track listing
No.	Title	Length
1.	"Keep Me on Your Mind"	3:17
2.	"Lover Take It Easy"	3:31
3.	"I Know You Know"	3:19
4.	"Grinch / Funeral" (Johanna O'Leary)	0:08
5.	"Old Dutch"	5:50
6.	"When I Was Younger"	3:17
7.	"Waiting and Waiting"	3:24
8.	"Hare and Hound"	2:23
9.	"Rock the Cradle"	3:42
10.	"Singing to the Mandolin"	3:58
11.	"The Clover"	3:37
12.	"Into the O"	2:48
13.	"Don't Know Why You Move Me"	2:50
14.	"Speak to Me Muse"	3:00
15.	"Think of the Royalties, Lads" (Joe O'Leary & Jonathan Parson)	0:35
16.	"Tumblin Down"	3:29
17.	"I Wanna Be Where You Are"	3:27
18.	"Over the Pass"	3:08
19.	"Your Arms (All the Time)"	2:44
20.	"See You Free" (Mitchell, Kaufman, Johnson, JT Bates, Cameron Ralston)	4:49
Total length:		63:16

== Personnel ==
Bonny Light Horseman

- Eric D. Johnson – vocals (tracks 1–3, 5–14, 16–20), guitars (2, 3, 7, 8, 10, 11, 14, 16, 18), synthesizer (3, 7, 11), Wurlitzer (5, 17), piano (5, 20), banjo (8, 9)
- Anaïs Mitchell – vocals (tracks 1–3, 5–14, 16–20), guitars (2, 3, 5, 8–11, 16, 18, 19)
- Josh Kaufman – guitars (tracks 1–3, 5–13, 16–18, 20), piano (2, 6, 7, 14, 17–19), Wurlitzer (3, 7, 9, 10, 13), mandolin (3, 8, 18), vocals (5, 8–10, 12, 14, 16, 18), synthesizer (5, 17, 20), harmonica (5, 17), harmonium (7, 12), organ (10, 11, 17, 18, 20), bass (10, 17, 20); keyboards, loops (10); tambourine (12), Hammond organ (16), vibraphone (19)

Additional musicians

- JT Bates – drums (tracks 1–3, 5–14, 16–20), percussion (2, 3, 5, 7–11, 13, 14, 16, 18–20), congas (3, 7), vocals (5, 14)
- Mike Lewis – bass (tracks 1, 3, 12, 13, 16–18), saxophone (2, 10, 14, 19), vocals (14)
- Annie Nero – bass (tracks 2, 19), vocals (2)
- Nathan Vanderpool – vocals (tracks 2, 5, 14), guitar (18)
- Cameron Ralston – bass (tracks 5–9, 11, 14), vocals (5, 14), guitar (19)
- Levis Town Chorus – vocals (tracks 5, 6, 8, 9, 14)
- Gillian Pelkonen – vocals (track 5)
- Molly O'Mahony – tambourine (track 5)

Technical

- Josh Kaufman – production
- Bella Blasko – engineering
- Gillian Pelkonen – engineering
- Nathan Vanderpool – engineering
- D. James Goodwin – mixing, mastering

== Charts ==
Chart performance for Keep Me on Your Mind/See You Free
Chart (2024)	Peak position
Scottish Albums (OCC)	36
Swedish Physical Albums (Sverigetopplistan)	14
UK Album Downloads (OCC)	45
UK Independent Albums (OCC)	9
