= Bonny Light Horseman (album) =

Studio album by Bonny Light Horseman
- Released: January 24, 2020
- Studio: The Funkhaus (Berlin, Germany); Dreamland (Hurley, New York)
- Genre: Folk
- Length: 36:50
- Label: 37d03d

Bonny Light Horseman chronology
Bonny Light Horseman (2020)	Rolling Golden Holy (2022)

Bonny Light Horseman is the debut album by American folk supergroup Bonny Light Horseman, released on January 24, 2020. Recording began at the site of the defunct Rundfunk der DDR and concluded in January 2019 at Dreamland Recording Studios near Woodstock, New York. Upon release, the album was met with mostly positive reviews, and debuted at 92 on Billboard's Top Album Sales chart.

The album's title track is a recording of a Napoleonic Wars-era English lament. Before recording the album, the group made their live debut at the 2018 edition of Eaux Claires music festival. Festival founders Aaron Dessner (guitar) and Justin Vernon (vocals) feature on Bonny Light Horseman and distributed the album under their 37d03d label.

The album received a Grammy Award for Best Folk Album nomination while the track "Deep in Love" was nominated for Grammy Award for Best American Roots Performance at the 63rd Annual Grammy Awards. The album was awarded Best Americana Record at the 2021 A2IM Libera Awards and was also nominated for Breakthrough Artist/Release.

== Track listing ==
Bonny Light Horseman track listing
No.	Title	Writer(s)	Length
1.	"Bonny Light Horseman"	Traditional	4:31
2.	"Deep in Love"	Traditional	5:09
3.	"The Roving"	Traditional	4:21
4.	"Jane Jane"	Traditional	3:06
5.	"Blackwaterside"	Traditional	3:25
6.	"Magpie's Nest"	Traditional	4:59
7.	"Lowlands"	Traditional	3:30
8.	"Mountain Rain"	Johnson; Kaufman; Mitchell; MC Taylor	2:40
9.	"Bright Morning Stars"	Traditional	2:05
10.	"10,000 Miles"	Traditional	3:04
Total length:			36:50

== Charts ==
Bonny Light Horseman chart performance
Chart (2020)	Peak position
Scottish Albums (OCC)	59
UK Album Downloads (OCC)	70
UK Americana Albums (OCC)	1
UK Independent Albums (OCC)	18
US Top Album Sales (Billboard)	92
