= Tchotchke (band) =

American rock band

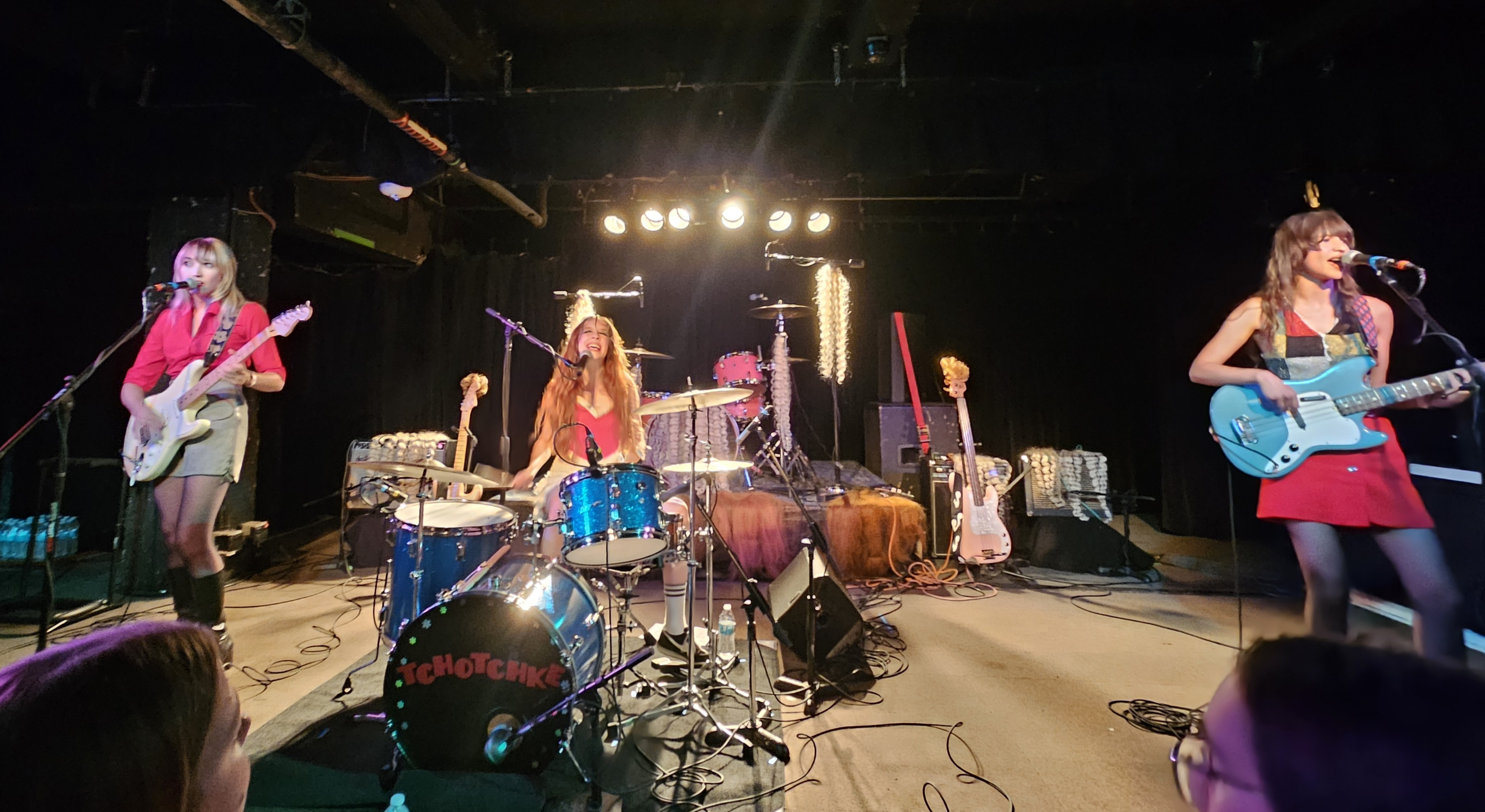
- Tchotchke performing in 2025

Background information
- Origin: New York City
- Genres: Rock
- Years active: 2020–present
- Labels: Tchotchke Records, Org Music
- Members: Eva Chambers; Anastasia Sanchez; Emily Tooraen
- Website: www.tchotchketheband.com

Tchotchke is an American rock band formed in New York City in 2020. The band is known for its 1960s-style pop sound and collaborations with the Lemon Twigs.

== History ==
Eva Chambers (daughter of actor Justin Chambers, born 1999) and Anastasia Sanchez (born c. 1999) grew up in Los Angeles and met in high school, where they bonded over classic rock and formed a series of bands with a changing cast of guitarists. As Pinky Pinky, they self-released two EPs and a 2019 full-length album, Turkey Dinner, on Bandcamp. The band moved to New York and recruited Emily Tooraen as a guitarist for their tour of Europe in 2020, soon renaming themselves Tchotchke.

Tchotchke's self-titled debut album, released in 2022, was mostly recorded before Tooraen joined. Their follow-up album, Playin' Dumb, featured all three members throughout and was released in 2025.

=== Lemon Twigs collaborations ===
The members of Tchotchke have close personal and working relationships with another New York–based rock band with pronounced roots in retro rock: the Lemon Twigs, composed of brothers Brian D'Addario (Sanchez's boyfriend) and Michael D'Addario (Chambers's boyfriend). The D'Addarios have produced both of Tchotchke's albums and contributed backing instrumentation to songs. Chambers, meanwhile, designed the cover art for the Twigs' 2023 and 2024 albums, Everything Harmony and A Dream Is All We Know (as well as Tchotchke's Playin' Dumb). She also contributed bass and backing vocals to the Twigs' November 2025 single, "Friday (I'm Gonna Love You)".

Tchotchke has played as the opening act for the Lemon Twigs during joint tours of the United States (2022) and Europe (2023).

On December 17, 2025, Tchotchke and the Lemon Twigs released a Christmas single they recorded together called "Tchotchkes".

== Style and influences ==
Tchotchke has acknowledged a strong influence from 1960s pop music, citing groups like the Beach Boys, the Ronettes, and the Shangri-Las as major sources of inspiration for their 2025 album, Playin' Dumb. Tchotchke typically employs girl group–style harmony vocals and records using analog methods, contributing a "vintage" sonic aesthetic. A reviewer for Under the Radar noted of Playin' Dumb, "Tchotchke feel like a secret unearthed from a dusty record crate, so much so that you almost expect to hear the faint crackle of vintage vinyl bleeding through the speakers." The reviewer noted that the band's "sugar sweet" harmonies are balanced by "sharp, witty lyrics". Their debut album was also noted for having art rock and power pop influences.

== Members ==
- Eva Chambers – bass, piano and keyboards, backing vocals
- Anastasia Sanchez – drums, lead vocals
- Emily Tooraen – guitar, backing vocals

== Discography ==
- Tchotchke (Tchotchke Records / Org Music, 2022)
- Playin' Dumb – (Tchotchke Records, 2025)
