= Bonny Light Horseman (band) =

American folk band

- Genres: Folk
- Years active: 2019–present
- Label: 37d03d; Jagjaguwar
- Members: Anaïs Mitchell; Eric D. Johnson; Josh Kaufman
- Website: www.bonnylighthorseman.com

Bonny Light Horseman is an American folk band consisting of Anaïs Mitchell, Eric D. Johnson (Fruit Bats, The Shins), and Josh Kaufman (The National, Hiss Golden Messenger, Josh Ritter). They released their debut eponymous album in January 2020. Their second album, Rolling Golden Holy, came out in October 2022. Their latest release, Keep Me On Your Mind/See You Free, was released in June 2024.

== Background ==
The band first came together at the Eaux Claires festival in 2018 when invited by the festival's co-founders Justin Vernon (of Bon Iver) and Aaron Dessner (of The National). From the early sessions for this performance, the trio decided to form the band in a more official capacity. Their self-titled debut album was released on January 25, 2020. The album contains a mixture of traditional British folk songs and original material. It was subsequently nominated for the Grammy Award for Best Folk Album.

In 2021 the band was inter alia part of the Newport Folk Festival in July. They also received the Libera Awards Best Americana Record 2021 for their self-named album by A2IM (the American Association of Independent Music).

In December 2021, the band announced in Uncut magazine that their second album would be coming in 2022. Mitchell described it as having "a little more of an American feeling on this album". The album was met with similar reviews as to their debut, but American Songwriter noted that this album had a bit more pop in its orientation.

== Discography ==
=== Studio albums ===
List of albums, with selected information
Title	Album details	Peak chart positions				
Title	Album details	US Sales	SCO	UK Amer.	UK DL	UK Indie
Bonny Light Horseman	Released: January 24, 2020; Label: 37d03d; Formats: LP, CD, digital download, streaming	92	59	1	70	18
Rolling Golden Holy	Released: October 7, 2022; Label: 37d03d; Formats: LP, CD, digital download, streaming	83	27	3	34	12
Keep Me on Your Mind/See You Free	Released: June 7, 2024; Label: Jagjaguwar; Formats: LP, CD, digital download, streaming	101	36	10	45	9

=== Singles ===
Title	Year	Album
"Bonny Light Horseman"	2019	Bonny Light Horseman
"Deep in Love"	2019	Bonny Light Horseman
"Jane Jane"	2019	Bonny Light Horseman
"The Roving"	2020	Bonny Light Horseman
"Bright Morning Stars"	2020	Bonny Light Horseman
"Green Rocky Road / Greenland Fishery"	2020	Non-album singles
"Buzzin' Fly"	2020	Non-album singles
"Clementine"	2020	Non-album singles
"California"	2022	Rolling Golden Holy
"Summer Dream"	2022	Rolling Golden Holy
"Exile"	2022	Rolling Golden Holy
"Sweetbread"	2022	Rolling Golden Holy
"Someone to Weep for Me"	2022	Rolling Golden Holy
"Once on Another Day"	2023	Non-album single
"When I Was Younger"	2024	Keep Me On Your Mind/See You Free
"I Know You Know"	2024	Keep Me On Your Mind/See You Free

== Music videos ==
Year	Title	Director	Album
2024	"I Know You Know"	Kimberly Stuckwisch	Keep Me On Your Mind / See You Free

== Awards and nominations ==
Year	Association	Category	Nominated work	Result	Ref
2021	Libera Awards	Libera Award for Best Americana Record	Bonny Light Horseman	Won	
2021	Libera Awards	Best Breakthrough Artist	Bonny Light Horseman	Nominated	
2021	Grammy Awards	Best Folk Album	Bonny Light Horseman	Nominated	
2021	Grammy Awards	Best American Roots Performance	"Deep In Love"	Nominated	
2025	Libera Awards	Folk Record	Keep Me On Your Mind/See You Free		
