= Tides of a Teardrop =

Studio album by Mandolin Orange
- Released: February 1, 2019
- Length: 42:15
- Label: Yep Roc

Mandolin Orange chronology
Blindfaller (2016)	Tides of a Teardrop (2019)	Watchhouse (2021)

Professional ratings
Aggregate scores
Source	Rating
Metacritic	82/100
Review scores
Source	Rating
AllMusic	4/5 stars
Paste	7/10
PopMatters	8/10

Tides of a Teardrop is the sixth studio album by American band Mandolin Orange. It was released on February 1, 2019 through Yep Roc Records.

== Track listing ==
No.	Title	Length
1.	"Golden Embers"	4:45
2.	"The Wolves"	4:05
3.	"Into the Sun"	3:52
4.	"Like You Used To"	4:37
5.	"Mother Deer"	3:20
6.	"Lonely All the Time"	3:07
7.	"When She's Feeling Blue"	5:01
8.	"Late September"	4:20
9.	"Suspended in Heaven"	4:13
10.	"Time We Made Time"	4:55

== Charts ==
Chart	Peak position
Dutch Albums (Album Top 100)	193
UK Americana Albums (Official Charts)	4
UK Independent Albums (Official Charts)	31
US Billboard 200	164
US Americana/Folk Albums (Billboard)	2
US Heatseekers Albums (Billboard)	1
US Independent Albums (Billboard)	2
US Top Bluegrass Albums (Billboard)	1
US Top Country Albums (Billboard)	13
US Top Rock Albums (Billboard)	31
