= Rituals (Watchhouse album) =

Studio album by Watchhouse
- Released: May 30, 2025
- Studio: Betty's; Rubber Room; The Sun Room; Loc Level
- Length: 40:56
- Label: Tiptoe Tiger; Thirty Tigers
- Producer: Andrew Marlin; Ryan Gustafson

Watchhouse chronology
Austin City Limits Live at the Moody Theater (2024)	Rituals (2025)

[When we were recording Rituals], it really felt like the only way to finish was to push through [...] We're glad the sound comes across as warm and cozy, even if the process didn’t feel that way to us.

- Watchhouse member Emily Frantz, on Rituals in an interview with Indy Week

Rituals is the eighth studio album by the American folk duo Watchhouse. It was released on May 30, 2025, by Tiptoe Tiger Music and Thirty Tigers. It was preceded by the release of the lead single "All Around You", on February 25, 2025, and the second single, the album's title track, on March 28, 2025.

== Critical reception ==
In Andrew Guiden's review of Rituals for American Highways, he wrote that the album "serves as another example of [Watchhouse]'s ability to create simple beauty." The album was ranked twenty-first on Rolling Stone Magazine's 25 Best Country and Americana Albums of the year.

== Track listing ==
All tracks are written by Andrew Marlin.

Rituals track listing
No.	Title	Length
1.	"Shape"	2:38
2.	"All Around You"	3:13
3.	"Beyond Meaning"	3:57
4.	"Rituals"	4:03
5.	"Firelight"	3:19
6.	"False Harbors"	3:59
7.	"In the Sun"	2:54
8.	"Glistening"	4:12
9.	"Endless Highway, Pt. 1"	3:06
10.	"Sway / Endless Highway, Pt. 2"	6:37
11.	"Patterns"	2:58
Total length:		40:56

== Personnel ==
Credits adapted from the album's liner notes.

=== Watchhouse ===
- Andrew Marlin – vocals, bouzouki, mandolin, electric tenor guitar, 12-string guitar, harmonium, acoustic guitar, mandola, pump organ, piano, production, additional tracking
- Emily Frantz – vocals, electric guitar, bouzouki, fiddle, acoustic guitar

=== Additional contributors ===
- Ryan Gustafson – vocals, baritone guitar, bass, 12-string guitar, harmonica, piano, production, additional tracking
- Josh Oliver – vocals, electric guitar, banjo, 12-string guitar, acoustic guitar
- Clint Mullican – bass
- Jamie Dick – drums, percussion
- Nat Smith – piano, Mellotron, cello, effects, additional tracking and engineering on "Beyond Meaning" and "Rituals"
- Matt Smith – pedal steel
- Alli Rogers – engineering
- Jerry Brown – additional tracking
- Kevin Boggs – pedal steel engineering on "Firelight" and "False Harbors"
- D. James Goodwin – mixing, mastering
- Zoe Van Buren – artwork
- Cameron Laws – creative direction
- Sandra Katharine Davidson – creative direction
- Cameron Cook – layout
