= Songs for the General Public =

Studio album by The Lemon Twigs
- Released: August 21, 2020
- Studio: Electric Lady Studios, Fortune Studios, Sonora Recorders, Los Angeles
- Genre: Glam rock
- Length: 43:16
- Label: 4AD
- Producer: Jonathan Rado; The Lemon Twigs

The Lemon Twigs chronology
Go to School (2018)	Songs for the General Public (2020)	Everything Harmony (2023)

Singles from Songs for the General Public
- 1. "The One" Released: March 2, 2020; 2. "Moon" Released: May 27, 2020; 3. "Live in Favor of Tomorrow" Released: July 9, 2020; 4. "No One Holds You Closer (Than the One You Haven't Met)" Released: July 28, 2020

Songs for the General Public is the third studio album by American rock band The Lemon Twigs. It was released on August 21, 2020 by 4AD. It was co-produced by Jonathan Rado of indie rock band Foxygen. The release was due for May 1, 2020 but postponed due to the COVID-19 pandemic.

The album consists of 12 tracks written and performed mostly by brothers Brian and Michael D'Addario.

== Critical reception ==
Songs for the General Public received favorable reviews from most music critics. On Metacritic, the album holds an average critic score of 75, based on 18 critics, indicating "generally favorable reviews". It scored 7.3/10 on AnyDecentMusic?'s aggregator.

== Track listing ==
All tracks are written by the Lemon Twigs.

Songs for the General Public track listing
No.	Title	Lead vocals	Length
1.	"Hell on Wheels"	Michael	3:39
2.	"Live in Favor of Tomorrow"	Brian	3:23
3.	"No One Holds You (Closer Than the One You Haven't Met)"	Brian	3:30
4.	"Fight"	Michael	3:02
5.	"Somebody Loving You"	Brian	3:50
6.	"Moon"	Michael	4:06
7.	"The One"	Brian	2:26
8.	"Only a Fool"	Brian	3:25
9.	"Hog"	Michael	4:23
10.	"Why Do Lovers Own Each Other?"	Brian	2:45
11.	"Leather Together"	Michael	3:28
12.	"Ashamed"	Michael	5:19
Total length:			43:16

== Personnel ==
Credits adapted from Songs for the General Public album liner notes.

The Lemon Twigs

- Brian D'Addario – vocals, ARP synthesizer, bas-dessus, cello, composer, drums, DX-7, E-Bow, guitar, Minimoog, mix control, piano, Prophet-5, string arrangements, woodwind arrangement
- Michael D'Addario – vocals, ARP Strings, bass, bells, cello, composer, drums, guitar, mix control, piano, string arrangements, tambourine, vocal arrangement, woodwind arrangement, Wurlitzer

Additional musicians

- Jonathan Rado – synthesizer
- Sean Dancy – vocal arrangement
- Michael Alampi – flute
- Maite Christi Francios – vocals
- Yolando Dancy – vocals
- Kanisha Moten – vocals
- Kaitlin Wolfberg – violin
- Daryl Johns – drums
- Vittorio Mura – baritone saxophone
- Santosh Sharma – tenor saxophone
- Elijah Shiffer – saxophone

Production

- Brian D'Addario – producer
- Michael D'Addario – producer, engineer
- Jonathan Rado – additional production, engineer
- Kevin Basko – engineer
- Rias Reed – engineer
- Carl Bespolka – assistant engineer
- Andrew Hunt – assistant engineer
- Greg Calbi – mastering
- Joe Nino-Hernes – lacquer cut

Artwork

- Michael D'Addario – art direction, layout
- Alison Fielding – art direction, layout
- Michael Hili – photography
- Jayme Paradiso – hair
- Jessica McFarland – wings
