= Till the Morning =

Studio album by Brian D'Addario
- Released: March 20, 2025
- Genre
- Length: 36:26
- Label: Headstack Records
- Producers: Brian D'Addario, Michael D'Addario, Daryl Johns

Brian D'Addario chronology
A Dream Is All We Know (2024)	Till the Morning (2025)	Look for Your Mind! (2026)

Brian D’Addario Solo chronology
Till The Morning (2025)

Singles from Till the Morning
- 1. "Till the Morning" Released: February 19, 2025

Till the Morning is the debut studio album by Brian D'Addario. It was released on March 20, 2025, and was the first to be released on the label Headstack Records. The label was founded by the Lemon Twigs, the band that D'Addario is a currently member of.

== Background ==
The album was produced by Brian D'Addario and his brother, Michael D'Addario. The title track was released on February 19, 2025.

== Reception ==
Professional ratings
Aggregate scores
Source	Rating
Metacritic	78/100
Review scores
Source	Rating
Clash	9/10 stars
MusicOMH	3.5/5 stars
Paste	6.8/10
Record Collector	4/5 stars

At Metacritic, which assigns a normalized rating out of 100 to reviews from mainstream critics, Till the Morning received an average score of 78 based on seven reviews, indicating "generally favorable reviews". Paste described the album as "a warm, jaunty springtime air that channels Simon and Garfunkel", giving it a rating of 6.8 out of ten. Clash praised it as "an outstanding effort rivalling his brilliant work with the Lemon Twigs." Ross Horton of MusicOMH remarked "This is Brian diving deep into his own world, giving us a glimpse of what's going on in his head. The issue, unsurprisingly, is that it essentially sounds exactly the same as a Lemon Twigs album," assigning it a rating of 3.5 out of five. Record Collector, rating the album four out of five, stated "This Summer's buoyant power-pop summons a blast of energy, while Useless Tears brings the "baroque" in the service of a modern-times rage against inequality."

== Track listing ==
All tracks are written by Brian D'Addario except noted.

Till the Morning track listing
No.	Title	Writer(s)	Length
1.	"Till the Morning"		3:42
2.	"Song of Everyone"	Stephen Kalinich, D'Addario	2:30
3.	"Nothing on My Mind"		3:37
4.	"One Day I'm Coming Home"		3:28
5.	"Only to Ease My Mind"		3:20
6.	"Flash in the Pan"		2:23
7.	"Company"		2:40
8.	"This Summer"	Michael D'Addario, Brian D'Addario	2:20
9.	"What You Are Is Beautiful"	Kalinich, D'Addario	2:32
10.	"Useless Tears"		4:22
11.	"Spirit Without a Home"		5:27
Total length:			36:26

== Personnel ==
Credits adapted from Till The Morning album liner notes.

- Brian D'Addario – vocals, guitars; drums (tracks 1, 3), bass guitar (tracks 1, 3–5, 10, 11), piano (tracks 1, 3, 6, 7, 11), organ (tracks 1, 3–5, 11), whistle (track 3), steel guitar (track 4), electric piano (tracks 5, 7, 11), mandolin, speed up piano, tambourine (track 6), synthesizers (track 7), pedal steel, cello (track 8), keyboards (track 11)

Additional musicians

- Michael D'Addario – harmony vocals (track 3–5, 8, 11), drums (tracks 4, 6, 11), guitars (track 5), bass guitar (tracks 6, 8)
- Daryl Johns – drums (track 8)
- Doug Machiz – cello (track 10)
- Otis Harriel – violin (track 10)
- Yuri Kye – violin (track 10)
- Rachyl Martinez – viola (track 10)

Technical

- Brian D'Addario – producer, string arrangements; engineer (tracks 1–5, 7)
- Paul D. Millar – mastering; engineer (track 1)
- Michael D'Addario – producer; engineer (tracks 3–6, 9–11)
- Rias Reed – engineer (tracks 5, 11)
- Daryl Johns – engineer (track 5), producer (track 8)
- Scott Hall – mastering
- Anastasia Sanchez – photography
- Eva Chambers – graphic design
