= Go to School =

Studio album by The Lemon Twigs
- Released: August 24, 2018
- Length: 59:01
- Label: 4AD

The Lemon Twigs chronology
| Brothers of Destruction (2017) | Go to School (2018) | Songs for the General Public (2020) |

The Lemon Twigs studio album chronology
| Do Hollywood (2016) | Go to School (2018) | Songs for the General Public (2020) |

Singles from Go to School
- 1. "If You Give Enough" Released: 10 July 2018; 2. "Small Victories" Released: 17 July 2018; 3. "The Fire" Released: 14 August 2018

Professional ratings
Aggregate scores
| Source | Rating |
|---|---|
| AnyDecentMusic? | 7.2/10 |
| Metacritic | 75/100 |
Review scores
| Source | Rating |
| AllMusic | 3.5/5 stars |
| Clash Magazine | 8/10 |
| DIY Magazine | 4/5 stars |
| NME | 3/5 stars |
| Paste | 8/10 |
| Pitchfork | 7/10 |

Go to School is the second studio album by American band the Lemon Twigs. It was released on August 24, 2018, through 4AD. Subtitled "a musical by the Lemon Twigs", it is a concept album about a chimpanzee raised as a human boy.

The album was recorded to tape and mixed on a 1970s 28-channel PolyGram console the band purchased from Jason Falkner.

== Track listing ==
All tracks are written by The Lemon Twigs.

| No. | Title | Lead vocals | Length |
|---|---|---|---|
| 1. | "Never in My Arms, Always in My Heart" | Michael D'Addario | 2:59 |
| 2. | "The Student Becomes the Teacher" | M. D'Addario | 3:09 |
| 3. | "Rock Dreams" | Susan Hall, with Todd Rundgren | 5:39 |
| 4. | "The Lesson" | Brian D'Addario | 3:13 |
| 5. | "Small Victories" | B. D'Addario | 3:56 |
| 6. | "Wonderin' Ways" | B. D'Addario | 2:46 |
| 7. | "The Bully" | B. D'Addario | 3:44 |
| 8. | "Lonely" | M. D'Addario | 3:41 |
| 9. | "Queen of My School" | M. D'Addario | 4:40 |
| 10. | "Never Know" | Rundgren, with B. D'Addario & Hall | 3:47 |
| 11. | "Born Wrong/Heart Song" | M. D'Addario | 3:14 |
| 12. | "The Fire" | M. D'Addario | 6:05 |
| 13. | "Home of a Heart (The Woods)" | B. D'Addario | 4:11 |
| 14. | "This Is My Tree" | M. D'Addario | 3:32 |
| 15. | "If You Give Enough" | B. D'Addario | 3:08 |
| 16. | "Go to School" (hidden track) | M. D'Addario, with Ronnie D'Addario | 1:17 |
| Total length: | | | 59:01 |

== Personnel ==
Credits adapted from Go To School album liner notes.

The Lemon Twigs

- Brian D'Addario – orchestral arrangements, conductor, vocals, guitar, bass, double bass, drums, cello, piano, organ, banjo, mandolin, percussion
- Michael D'Addario – vocals, guitar, bass, drums, piano, banjo, chimes, percussion

Additional musicians

- Jody Stephens – drums (2)
- Alex Slomka – horns, woodwind
- Austin Alianiello – horns, woodwind
- Brad Mulholland – horns, woodwind
- Cameron Carrella – horns, woodwind
- Greg DeAngelis – horns, woodwind
- Josh Dickerson – horns, woodwind
- Joshua Kinney – horns, woodwind
- Katie Scheele – horns, woodwind
- Rich Bomzer – horns, woodwind
- Susan Hall – lead vocals (3, 12)
- Todd Rundgren – lead vocals
- Adam Adler – strings
- Alice Levine – strings
- Amy Noll – strings
- Benjamin Sher – strings
- Dan Lamas – strings
- Eric Allen – strings
- Rachel Krieger – strings
- Dale Stuckenbruck – theremin (13)
- Ronnie D'Addario – vocals (1, 13)
- Danny Ayala – vocals (13)
- Natalie Mering – vocals (12)
- Thomas Murphy – vocals (7, 12)

Production

- Brian D'Addario – writer, producer, mixing
- Michael D'Addario – writer, producer, mixing, engineer
- Ronnie D'Addario – assisting engineer, music consultant/ recording consultant
- Scott Hull – mastering

Artwork

- Evan Laffer – art direction
- Olivia Bee – photography

== Charts ==
| Chart (2018) | Peak position |
|---|---|
| French Albums (SNEP) | 147 |
| UK Albums (Official Charts) | 93 |

== Accolades ==
| Publication | Accolade | Rank | Ref. |
|---|---|---|---|
| The Times | Best Albums of 2018 | N/A | |
| Uncut | Top 75 Albums of 2018 | 36 | |
