= Such Jubilee =

Studio album by Mandolin Orange
- Released: May 5, 2015
- Studio: Echo Mountain Recording
- Genre: Folk, Americana
- Length: 36:07
- Label: Yep Roc Records
- Producer: Mandolin Orange

Mandolin Orange chronology
This Side of Jordan (2013)	Such Jubilee (2015)	Blindfaller (2016)

Such Jubilee is the fourth studio album by North Carolina folk duo Mandolin Orange, currently known as Watchhouse. It was released on May 5, 2015, through Yep Roc Records.

== Background ==
Andrew Marlin said the following about the song "Blue Ruin" on their website, which he wrote about the Sandy Hook Elementary School shooting:

"I was thinking about all those kids who wouldn’t be there on Christmas morning. People can get so heated and so serious about change and addressing gun violence when something that traumatic happens, but a month or two afterwards, they've all cooled down and it's not in the forefront of their thoughts anymore. But two years later, those kids still aren't around on Christmas morning and their parents are still dealing with that."

== Track listing ==
Song title	Length	Writer(s)
Old Ties and Companions	3:08	Andrew Marlin
Settled Down	3:03	Andrew Marlin
Little Worlds	3:30	Andrew Marlin
Rounder	3:46	Andrew Marlin
From Now On	3:47	Andrew Marlin
Jump Mountain Blues	3:05	Andrew Marlin
That Wrecking Ball	3:14	Andrew Marlin
Blue Ruin	5:17	Andrew Marlin
Daylight	3:13	Andrew Marlin
Of Which There Is No Like	3:59	Andrew Marlin

== Personnel ==
- Andrew Marlin – vocals, mandolin, acoustic guitar, bass, banjo, snare
- Emily Frantz – vocals, violin, acoustic guitar, electric guitar (on "Blue Ruin")
- Josh Oliver – electric guitar, Wurlitzer, backing vocals (on "From Now On" and "Jump Mountain Blues"), and acoustic guitar (on "That Wrecking Ball")
