= Do Hollywood =

Studio album by the Lemon Twigs
- Released: October 14, 2016
- Recorded: 2015
- Studio: Dream Star (Los Angeles)
- Genres: Pop; progressive rock
- Length: 43:29
- Label: 4AD
- Producer: Jonathan Rado

The Lemon Twigs chronology
Do Hollywood (2016)	Brothers of Destruction (2017)

The Lemon Twigs studio album chronology
Do Hollywood (2016)	Go to School (2018)

Singles from Do Hollywood
- 1. "As Long as We're Together" Released: 7 June 2016; 2. "These Words" Released: 7 July 2016

Do Hollywood is the debut studio album by the American rock band the Lemon Twigs, founded by brothers Brian D'Addario and Michael D'Addario. The album was released by 4AD on October 14, 2016, and promoted with two singles, a tour across North America and Europe, and an appearance on The Tonight Show Starring Jimmy Fallon.

In 2014, Brian sent the band's demos to the musician Jonathan Rado via Twitter. Rado enjoyed them and in early 2015, invited them to produce and record Do Hollywood at his own Dream Star Studio in Los Angeles. The duo continued working on their material for the next 18 months. In 2015, they released an album titled What We Know, however, they do not view it as an official album, rather a part of their learning process.

Do Hollywood is inspired by bands such as the Beatles and the Beach Boys, as well as a variety of music from the 1970s. It is primarily a pop and progressive rock album inspired by a variety of other genres. It is sequenced in a way that each brother's songs alternate, and play one after the other. Many critics drew comparisons to a number of different rock bands and expressed the opinion that the album's sound is a blend of the brothers' favorite music in a contemporary ear. It received generally favorable reviews from critics; some enjoyed the band's songwriting and ability to twist their influences into their own sound, though others felt the album was overly reliant on nostalgia. Several publications featured it on their year-end lists.

== Background ==
Brian D'Addario and Michael D'Addario are two brothers from Long Island that comprise the rock band the Lemon Twigs. Cam Lindsay from Exclaim! proposed the idea that the title of their debut album, Do Hollywood, is a joke and an "eye-wink to the fact that they've already done Hollywood", nodding to the brothers' time as child actors. Brian performed roles in television shows such as Law & Order and CSI: NY, while Michael acted in films such as Sinister and People Like Us (both 2012).

Their father, Ronnie D'Addario, is also a musician, and their mother was an actress. When they were growing up, their home was "saturated with music", as instruments and musical equipment were available, and their father regularly spun records. Both of the brothers have been playing music together since they were in elementary school. They both started playing the drums when they were age five, and Brian started playing the guitar when he was age seven. By age 10, he learned bass and keyboards. Michael was influenced by the musicians Keith Moon and Dave Grohl to keep playing the drums until he was age 13. While their father would teach them the basics of each instrument, Brian also took classical guitar lessons at age 12. Brian has said that when he was a child, he did not want to be an actor, and instead wanted to be a musician. To focus on the band, Michael graduated high school early. When Brian was age 16 and Michael was age 14, they recorded an "album of sorts" titled What We Know (2015), which Michael views as a "part of their learning process rather than an official release". They created it thinking they would be a psychedelic band, though they realized the sound was not meant for them.

== Production ==
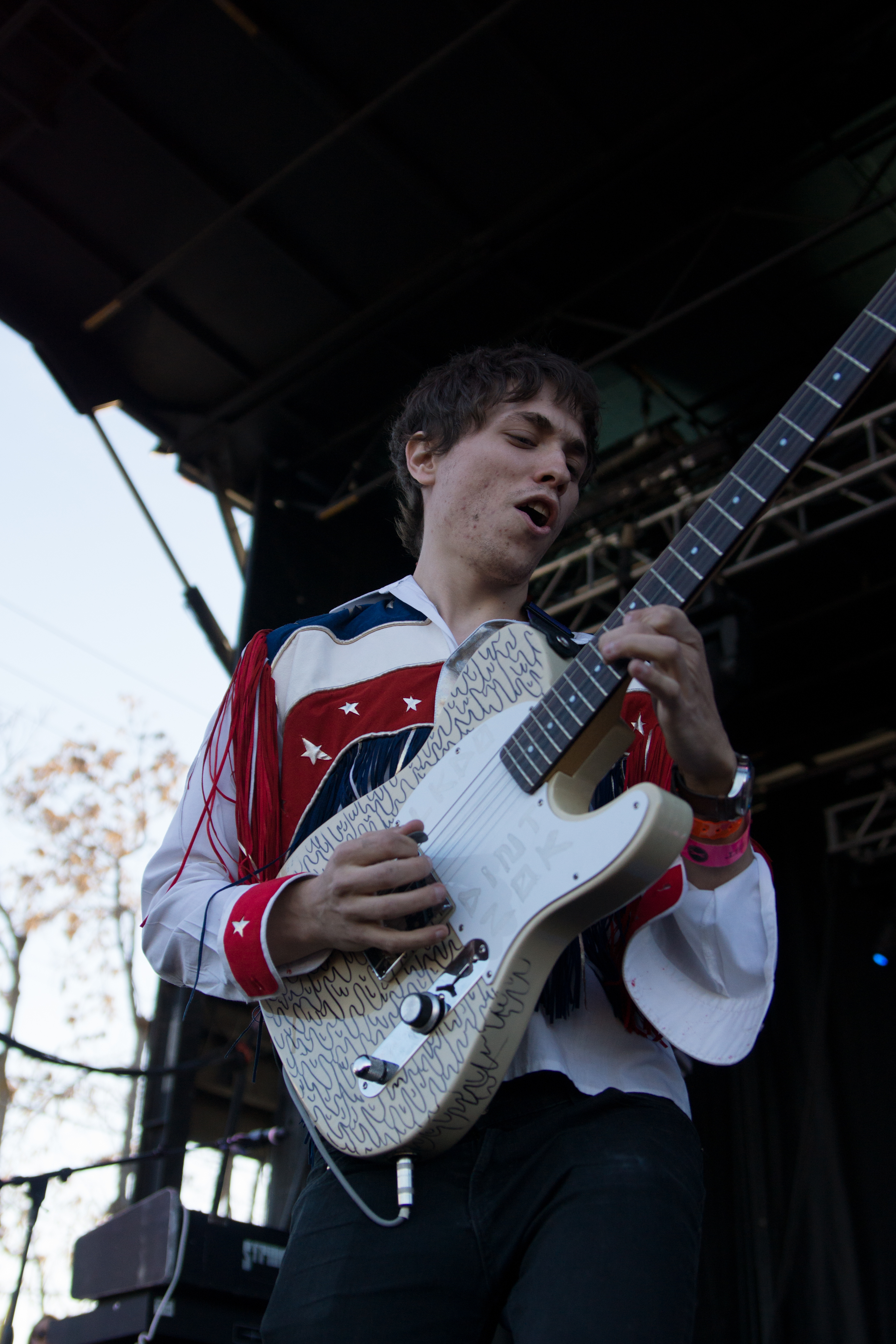
Do Hollywood was produced by Jonathan Rado and recorded at his own Dream Star Studio in Los Angeles.

Do Hollywood was recorded during a school break, as the two were in high school. They recorded demos and sent them to record labels over the Internet, with no luck at first. However, in 2014, the band caught the attention of Jonathan Rado of Foxygen after Brian messaged him via Twitter. Rado enjoyed their demos and invited them to record at his Los Angeles house, dubbed Dream Star Studio. They recorded the outline of the album in early 2015 over a 12-day period, and continued working on the tracks on and off over the course of the next 18 months, such as adding strings and brass instruments. While the duo worked on the album, they signed with the British record label 4AD.

Though they both wrote all of the songs on the record, they wrote them separately. Michael commented on how, when writing the album, they had "bigger egos at the time" and "didn't want each other to sing on the other's songs". In their writing process, Brian does not know what he writes in the moment until he takes a step back, while Michael prefers to write in straightforward storytelling. Michael also wrote three songs about his ex-girlfriend.

The last track Brian made for the record was "How Lucky Am I?", and he did not get a chance to demo it. He sent Rado a voice message of him playing the song on the piano, which Rado responded with: "We should just do it that way." He then added the harmonies after, because he always thought of the song to have harmonies. When making the song "Frank", he started with the piano melody that is reminiscent of Frank Sinatra, and then wrote its lyrics afterwards. Rado liked a drum sound that the band did not want in the record, but they kept it in, and Brian expressed later, "It turned out great in the end, so I was actually quite wrong about that".

In 2016, Brian preferred recording demo versions of his songs on an iPad, while Michael liked to record demos using cassette.

== Style and influences ==
Do Hollywood has been described as primarily a pop and progressive rock album by music critics. It also contains influences of psychedelic pop, glam rock, baroque pop, psychedelia, and progressive pop. Its sound is influenced by a variety of music from the 1970s. The Lemon Twigs were inspired by the music of bands such as the Beatles and the Beach Boys. David Edwards from Under the Radar believed the band was inspired by musicians like Brian Wilson, Paul McCartney, Scott Walker, Jeff Lynne, and Ray Davies, creating a "world of color, exploration, and barnstorming joy". The Line of Best Fit's Chris Taylor said the album mixes of all of the band's favorite music growing up into a contemporary ear. Barry Divola of The Sydney Morning Herald thought the band created "their own woozy, cracked, trippy universe in constantly evolving songs that are never content to take the shortest distance between two points". Rachel Redfern, for Loud and Quiet, proposed the band's influences may be Queen, John Lennon, McCartney, Big Star, and the Bay City Rollers, and said the album "plays like a bonkers show-reel of a fandom match by ability". For Paste, Jaimie Cranford called it 1970s soul and funk music mixed with the work of the rock band MGMT. The Independent's Shaun Curran wrote that the album can be "overwhelming in its gleeful experimentation, but at its heart is some delightful songwriting". For Mojo, James McNair wrote the album "taps doo wop, Big Star guitars, Supertramp keys and harpsichord". The album is sequenced in the way that each brother's songs alternate, and play one after the other. Cranford said that this sequencing "perfectly sums up" the album: "at first you're not sure what's happening, but you find yourself suddenly pulled in, unable to turn away."

=== Songs ===
Do Hollywood's opening track is "I Wanna Prove to You", a surf pop track with doo-wop backing vocals. Taylor compared it to the work of the Beach Boys and Wilson, especially its harmonies and guitar melodies. It opens with theatrical lyrics that transition into a slow-burn middle-section that was compared to Pet Sounds (1966) by the Beach Boys by critics. Matt Wilkinson of NME compared it to the work of Paul McCartney and Wings, while Tim Sendra from AllMusic likened it to the work of Paul Williams. Lindsay thought it sounds "like two songs more than one", and Cranford said it sounds like something that would play at a sock hop in the 1950s, making a "timeless sound". "Those Days Is Comin' Soon" is a skiffle song that expands into a "marching band stomp", according to Edwards. Divola thought its opening bit sounds like a mix between the Monkees and show tune music, before enveloping in a progressive rock middle-section with harmonies reminiscent of Queen. Wilkinson likened the track to the work of the Kinks, alongside Juan Edgardo Rodríguez of No Ripcord. Lindsay thought that it feels like a "circus freak show" alongside its following track, "Haroomata", due to its psychedelic and progressive passages unfolding in less than three minutes. Its introduction begins with a harpsichord, until it becomes something in parallel to polka music. Album's production is a blend of carnival-like pomp, psychedelic harmonies, intense guitar riffs, and thoughtful piano parts. Taylor called it "the missing link between Sgt. Pepper's Lonely Hearts Club Band and The White Album".

The following "Baby, Baby" begins with a soft bass line and a relaxed tempo that highlights the chorus. As it instrumentally settles, the band switches to a lively, fast-paced section before returning to the chorus. Sendra said it sounds like a mix of the Muppets and the Flaming Lips. "These Words" is a pop song that also switches between other genres. Its introduction was compared to the theme of Grange Hill by Redfern, who also highlighted its "recurring vaudeville circus music". A track with honky-tonk pianos, fuzzy guitar riffs, and synthesizers, it also contains a powerful "arms-aloft" chorus and a xylophone solo. "As Long as We're Together" has a "soaring" chorus described as the Rolling Stones-meets-David Bowie, according to Divola. Dork's Rob Mesure said it mixes "All the Young Dudes" by Mott the Hoople (1972) and baroque synthesizers into "cracked, swirling psychedelia". Sendra thought that the song has "soul-baring lyrics, glass-cracking falsettos, uplifting choruses, rinky-dink synths, left-field tempo changes, unexpected instruments, and simply strummed acoustic guitars". "How Lucky Am I?" is said to have harmonies reminiscent of the Beatles, according to Divola, as well as rich piano chords and a pop chorus. "Hi+Lo" switches back and forth between psychedelic rock verses and 1980s punk choruses driven by drums. The penultimate track, "Frank", has an influence of classical music. A near-seven-minute closer, "A Great Snake" starts with a "Love-like gently psychedelic beginning"; it also contains "squiggly" synthesizers, multiple guitar solos, an "epic" space rock middle section as well as a bossa nova and lounge music outro.

== Promotion and release ==
The Lemon Twigs released Do Hollywood's lead single, "As Long as We're Together", on June 7, 2016. It was followed by "These Words" on July 7, alongside an announcement that they signed to 4AD; they also briefly toured North America during July. They announced the album on August 11, alongside a release of a music video for "These Words", directed by Brook Linder. They played with Car Seat Headrest in September, and then toured with Sunflower Bean. They made their national television debut on September 26, performing "These Words" on The Tonight Show Starring Jimmy Fallon. A music video for "As Long as We're Together" was released on October 13; it was shot in California and directed by Michael's then-girlfriend Arrow de Wilde. Do Hollywood was released by 4AD the following day. On November 14, 2016, they announced their first major headlining tour taking place from November 2016 to February 2017, across North America and Europe. "I Wanna Prove to You" received a music video on February 13, 2017, and was shot at the director Nick Roney's grandparents' house in Utah.

== Reception ==
Professional ratings
Aggregate scores
Source	Rating
AnyDecentMusic?	7.1/10
Metacritic	76/100
Review scores
Source	Rating
AllMusic	3.5/5 stars
DIY	2/5 stars
Exclaim!	8/10
The Guardian	4/5 stars
The Line of Best Fit	8.5/10
MusicOMH	3.5/5 stars
NME	4/5 stars
Paste	7.4/10
Q	3/5 stars
Under the Radar	8.5/10 stars

=== Critical response ===
At the review aggregator Metacritic, Do Hollywood received a weighted average score of 76 out of 100, based on 14 reviews, indicating "generally favorable reviews". AnyDecentMusic? compiled 11 reviews and gave Do Hollywood an average of 7.1 out of 10, based on their assessment of the critical consensus. Tim Sendra of AllMusic and Jaimie Cranford of Paste listed "Baby, Baby" as one of the album's best songs; on the other hand, the former thought "Those Days Is Comin' Soon" was the weakest track on the album. Cranford also listed "Hi+Lo" as a highlight.

Rob Mesure of Dork called the album's best moments "stunning", and concluded his review by saying the album "is a blast". The Guardian's Michael Hann praised the brothers' songwriting ability and called their album "a curiosity, but a pretty glorious one". The Line of Best Fit's Chris Taylor applauded the record for having "surprises around every corner that constantly thrill and excite", and thought the album is "like nothing you've ever really heard before". Cam Lindsay, writing for Exclaim!, believed that even though Rado contributed significantly to the record's sound, the "credit really belongs to the D'Addario brothers", calling them a "unique songwriting team". He further wrote how the album sounds like it was "written and recorded by seasoned studio eccentrics" and highlighted how "there's nary a dull moment" on the record. In a retrospective review for Mojo, James McNair said the album "fizzes with fresh-faced brio" and called it a "lucky bag of shamelessly theatrical pop".

Some critics felt that Do Hollywood was a fresh and authentic debut album, and was simple but effective. Sendra wrote how though it is only their debut album, the band "sound like they've got it all figured out". He also commented on how is "both breathtakingly refreshing that the brothers don't play anything straight and a puzzling pain in the neck when they do something wacky that they might not have needed to do". Wilkinson said the album "feels authentic, like the Lemon Twigs aren't hiding anything" and called it "thrilling for the most part". Edwards praised it for being a "unique and kaleidoscopic trip through sound and melody with a profound nostalgia", and lauded the band for creating "one of the most striking, individual, and colorful debuts of the year". Cranford applauded the album's instrumentation for allowing "lyrics that would normally sound too simplistic to sound just right".

Critics enjoyed Do Hollywood's spin on the band's influences and its mix of genres. Redfern described the record as a parade of the band's influences; a "bonkers show-reel of a fandom match by ability". A reviewer for Uncut called the album's "mix of baroque pop, prog rock and psychedelia is as bewildering as it is entertaining". Cranford thought the album is "stylistically complex", further approving of its "unique blend of styles" and for making their captivating ability to mix an array of genres. Taylor wrote that the band roll "up all their influences like a giant snowball", and that though "it's easy to spot where the influences are taking effect, [it is] even more exciting to see how they twist them". James Oldham from Q said the "weird, consciously retro amalgam of Van Dyke Parks, Big Star and Queen actually works". The Sydney Morning Herald's Barry Divola thought the record is "totally nuts, in the best possible way", lauding its spin on the band's influences.

Some reviewers got a mixed or a negative impression, feeling that the album comes across excessively ostentatious, messy, insubstantial, and overly reliant on nostalgia. In a review for MusicOMH, Chris White thought that although the album "is a work of deeply impressive songcraft, musicianship and arranging", it could sound "a little forced and over-egged". Jake Kennedy, for Record Collector, believed that "the most exciting thing about [the band] – their knack with a tune and fanfare – is buried beneath what could be considered unnecessary flourishes". Reviewing the album for DIY, Tom Connick criticized the album's "lack of direction" and said the band's "reliance on nostalgia is at best dated; at worst, pure laziness". Rodríguez wrote how the album is "a downright mess riddled with poor songwriting choices that are disguised as clever". He concluded by telling the band that "you don't have to join your generation [...] but it'd also do you some good to not look down on your peers, either".

=== Year-end lists ===
Select year-end list appearances for Do Hollywood
Critic/publication	List	Rank	Ref
Clash	Albums of the Year 2016	20	
Dork	The Albums of the Year 2016	18	
Gaffa	Album of the Year 2016	23	
Les Inrockuptibles	The 50 best albums of 2016	4	
MusicOMH	Top 50 Albums of 2016	50	
NME	Albums of the Year 2016	44	
Q	50 Albums of the Year	26	
Under the Radar	Top 100 Albums of 2016	50	

== Track listing ==
All tracks are written by Brian D'Addario and Michael D'Addario. All tracks are produced by Jonathan Rado.

No.	Title	Lead vocals	Length
1.	"I Wanna Prove to You"	Brian	3:41
2.	"Those Days Is Comin' Soon"	Michael	2:23
3.	"Haroomata"	Brian	2:31
4.	"Baby, Baby"	Michael	4:56
5.	"These Words"	Brian	3:41
6.	"As Long as We're Together"	Michael	5:03
7.	"How Lucky Am I?"	Brian	3:40
8.	"Hi+Lo"	Michael	4:58
9.	"Frank"	Brian	5:57
10.	"A Great Snake"	Michael	6:39
Total length:			43:29

== Personnel ==
Credits adapted from Do Hollywood album liner notes.

- The Lemon Twigs – writing, additional production
- Brian D'Addario – vocals, guitar, bass, drums, piano, keyboards, violin, cello, trumpet, orchestration, mixing
- Michael D'Addario – vocals, guitar, bass, drums, piano, keyboards, percussion
- Jonathan Rado – production, mixing (6), vocals (10), guitar (4), electronic percussion (6, 10)
- Sam France – vocals (1, 2, 6)
- Danny Ayala – vocals (5)
- Ronnie D'Addario – mixing (7)
- Greg Calbi – mastering
