= A Dream Is All We Know =

Studio album by the Lemon Twigs
- Released: May 3, 2024
- Genre: Power pop
- Length: 34:23
- Label: Captured Tracks
- Producer: The Lemon Twigs

The Lemon Twigs chronology
Everything Harmony (2023)	A Dream Is All We Know (2024)	Look for Your Mind! (2026)

Brian D’Addario chronology
Everything Harmony (2023)	A Dream Is All We Know (2024)	Till the Morning (2025)

Singles from A Dream Is All We Know
- 1. "My Golden Years" Released: January 2, 2024; 2. "They Don't Know How to Fall in Place" Released: February 7, 2024; 3. "A Dream is All I Know" Released: March 13, 2024; 4. "How Can I Love Her More" Released: April 9, 2024

A Dream Is All We Know is the fifth studio album by American rock band the Lemon Twigs, released on May 3, 2024, through Captured Tracks. The album's songs were all written, performed, and produced by the two D'Addario brothers themselves, although one of the tracks was co-produced with Sean Ono Lennon and features him on bass guitar.

The album, which was released to favorable reviews from critics, draws sonic inspiration from late-1960s power pop and progressive rock. The brothers released four singles in early 2024, leading up to the release of A Dream Is All We Know.

== Composition and recording ==
According to band member Michael D'Addario, A Dream Is All We Know is "more whimsical" than their previous album, Everything Harmony. Despite the more upbeat tone, the lyrics also reference fears of not achieving one's potential and the elusiveness of dreams. Musical styles of the album's songs include power pop ("My Golden Years") and doo-wop ("In the Eyes of the Girl"). The D'Addarios cited the Beatles, the Beach Boys, the Association and Sagittarius as some of their 1960s pop inspirations for the album. Brian cited Roy Wood's mid-1970s albums Boulders and Mustard as inspiration to perform his own horn and string arrangements on A Dream Is All We Know. The experimental nature of Swedish pop group Tages' 1967 album Studio was additionally cited as a strong influence in the recording of the album.

A Dream Is All We Know was recorded in the band's small studio in north Brooklyn, using tape and other analog effects like spring reverb. Sean Ono Lennon recorded and co-produced the track, "In the Eyes of the Girl" at his upstate New York studio. Ten of the 12 tracks on A Dream Is All We Know were recorded after Everything Harmony; "Ember Days" was recorded during the Everything Harmony sessions, and "If You and I Are Not Wise" dated back several years.

== Critical reception ==
Professional ratings
Aggregate scores
Source	Rating
AnyDecentMusic?	7.6/10
Metacritic	80/100
Review scores
Source	Rating
NME	4/5 stars
Far Out	4.5/5 stars
The List	4/5 stars
The Times	4/5 stars
The Telegraph	4/5 stars

A Dream Is All We Know received a score of 80 out of 100 on review aggregator Metacritic based on 13 critics' reviews, which the website categorized as "generally favorable". NME characterized the album as "much sunnier" than its predecessor and based around "Beach Boys harmonies and off-kilter melodies (think the Beatles when they were starting to get weird)", though also showing glimpses of "a future way beyond their influences". Far Out praised it as "a firm and fully realised album executed with certainty. It might not be absolutely perfect, but overall, the stunning performances eclipse any blemishes." The Guardian listed A Dream Is All We Know as one of their best albums from the first half of 2024.

"My Golden Years", the album's first single, drew particular critical praise. Anthony Fantano ranked "My Golden Years" at number 13 on his year-end list of best singles from 2024. In December 2024, James Poniewozik wrote in the New York Times that the song was "the soundtrack of my year".

=== Year-end lists ===
Select year-end rankings for A Dream Is All We Know
Publication/critic	Accolade	Rank	Ref.
MOJO	The Best Albums Of 2024	8	
Rough Trade UK	Albums of the Year 2024	39	
Anthony Fantano	Top 50 Albums of 2024	39	
Paste	40 Best Rock Albums of 2024	20	

== Track listing ==
All tracks are written by the Lemon Twigs. All songs produced and mixed by the Lemon Twigs, except track 6 produced by the Lemon Twigs and Sean Ono Lennon.

A Dream Is All We Know track listing
No.	Title	Lead vocals	Length
1.	"My Golden Years"	Michael	3:13
2.	"They Don't Know How to Fall in Place"	Brian	3:33
3.	"Church Bells"	Michael	2:07
4.	"A Dream Is All I Know"	Brian	3:43
5.	"Sweet Vibration"	Brian	2:48
6.	"In the Eyes of the Girl"	Michael	3:04
7.	"If You and I Are Not Wise"	Brian and Michael	2:41
8.	"How Can I Love Her More"	Michael	2:48
9.	"Ember Days"	Brian	2:55
10.	"Peppermint Roses"	Michael	2:32
11.	"I Should've Known Right from the Start"	Brian	2:36
12.	"Rock On (Over and Over)"	Michael	2:21
Total length:			34:23

7" flexi-disc bonus track
No.	Title	Lead vocals	Length
13.	"Gifts"	Brian	3:13

== Personnel ==
Credits adapted from A Dream Is All We Know album liner notes.

The Lemon Twigs

- Brian D'Addario – vocals, keyboards; drums (tracks 1, 3–5, 8, 10–12), bass guitar (tracks 3–5, 8, 10–12), electric guitar (tracks 2–5, 7, 8, 10, 12), acoustic guitar (tracks 7–9, 11), 12-string guitar (tracks 3, 6, 7, 9, 10), mandolin (track 11); strings, horns (ext. 9); orchestral arrangements, mixing
- Michael D'Addario – vocals; drums (tracks 2, 6, 7), bass guitar (tracks 1, 2, 7), rhythm guitar (tracks 1, 10, 12), lead guitar (tracks 3, 12), acoustic guitar (tracks 1, 3), 12-string guitar (track 1); mixing, engineering

Additional work

- Sean Ono Lennon – co-producer (track 6)
- Paul D. Millar – mastering at Bug Sound
- Scout Hull – mastering at Masterdisk
- Eva Chambers – art direction and photography
- Scott Hollingsworth – engineering (track 6)
- Matthew Cullen – engineering (track 6)
- Rias Reed – engineering (track 9)

Additional musicians

- Sean Ono Lennon – bass guitar (track 6)
- Daryl Johns – upright bass (track 9)
- Andres Valbuena – drums (track 9)
- Otis Harriel – violin (track 9)
- Yuri Kye – violin (track 9)
- Rachyl Martinez – viola (track 9)
- Doug Machiz – cello (track 9)
- Paul D. Millar – flange (track 10)

== Charts ==
Chart performance for A Dream Is All We Know
Chart (2024)	Peak position
Japanese Hot Albums (Billboard Japan)	82
Scottish Albums (Official Charts)	9
UK Album Downloads (Official Charts)	24
UK Independent Albums (Official Charts)	7
