= This Side of Jordan =

Studio album by Mandolin Orange
- Released: August 19, 2013
- Genre: Folk, Americana
- Length: 43:37
- Label: Yep Roc Records
- Producer: Andrew Marlin

Mandolin Orange chronology
Haste Make/Hard Hearted Stranger	This Side of Jordan	Such Jubilee

This Side of Jordan is the third studio album by North Carolina folk duo Mandolin Orange, currently known as Watchhouse. Released on August 19, 2013 through Yep Roc Records, it is their first record released on the Yep Roc Records label.

== Personnel ==
- Andrew Marlin – vocals, mandolin, acoustic guitar, organ (on "Cavalry"), bass (on "Waltz About Whiskey")
- Emily Frantz – vocals, violin, acoustic guitar
- Ryan Gustafson – electric guitar (on "Morphine Girl")

== Track listing ==
Song title	Length	Writer(s)
House of Stone	3:17	Andrew Marlin
Turtle Dove and the Crow	3:23	Andrew Marlin
There Was a Time	4:14	Andrew Marlin
The Runaround	3:07	Andrew Marlin
Cavalry	3:16	Andrew Marlin
Black Widow	3:14	Andrew Marlin
The Doorman	4:32	Andrew Marlin
Morphine Girl	4:20	Andrew Marlin
Hey Adam	4:08	Andrew Marlin
Waltz About Whiskey	3:47	David Andrew Hutcheson, Andrew Marlin
Until the Last Light Fades	3:20	Andrew Marlin
