= JC Brooks Band =

American indie soul band

- Origin: Chicago, United States
- Genres: Soul, post-punk, neo-soul, punk, indie rock, funk
- Years active: 2007–present
- Labels: Bloodshot Records
- Members: JC Brooks (vocals), Alec Lehrman (guitar), Theodore Berry the IV (bass), Jeremy Tromburg (keyboard), Jovia Armstrong (percussion) and Kevin Marks (drums)
- Past members: Billy Bungeroth (guitar), Andy Rosenstein (keyboard), Ben Taylor (bass)
- Website: jcbrooksband.com

JC Brooks Band (formerly JC Brooks & the Uptown Sound) is an American indie soul band from Chicago, Illinois, United States. The band consists of JC Brooks (vocals), Alec Lehrman (guitar), Theodore Berry the IV (bass), Jeremy Tromburg (keyboard), Jovia Armstrong (percussion) and Kevin Marks (drums). Describing their sound as "post-punk soul," the band combines elements of funk, soul, indie rock, R&B, and punk, into a unique take on the soul genre.

== History ==
The band formed in 2007 when guitarist Billy Bungeroth “put an ad on Craigslist with a vision of a multi-racial band that made sexy and political music that you could dance to”. At the time, JC Brooks was involved in the production of the musical Ragtime. “[W]e had just wrapped up rehearsals and were about to open. I was like, ‘Well, I no longer have rehearsals sucking up my evening — let’s see what’s out on Craig’s List.’ So I answered an ad that Billy posted and now I’ve stopped doing theater”. Ben Taylor (bass) and Kevin Marks (drums) joined soon after, and together with Bungeroth and Brooks formed the original Uptown Sound lineup, later adding keyboardist Andy Rosenstein to round out the band's sound.

In 2009, the band served as the backing band for the Numero Group's “Eccentric Soul Revue.” They played a Chicago date in April, then toured with the Revue in November 2009, backing such influential Chicago soul men as Syl Johnson and Otis Clay.

The band participated in the 2011 production of the musical Passing Strange. Brooks played the narrator and protagonist, while the rest of the band provided the music. Also in 2011, JC Brooks & the Uptown Sound performed at Wilco's Solid Sound Festival, where they were joined on-stage by Jeff Tweedy for a performance of their single "I'm Trying to Break Your Heart," penned by Tweedy and originally recorded by Wilco on their Yankee Hotel Foxtrot album. In 2012, they played Lollapalooza on the Sony Stage.

The band's third full-length album, Howl, was released May 2013 on Bloodshot Records. A review by Paste magazine states the album "shows the band's maturation while staying true to the introspective lyrics and big sound for which they're known." According to music blog Indie Shuffle, "Howl gives the listener the sense that the band has not only matured with their songwriting, but have understood how to take ownership of a sound that is singularly theirs while uniquely Chicago." NPR Music also had high praise for Howl, stating "[the album] goes farther in rejecting the strictures of vintage by-the-booksism by exploring the ways other revivals—especially the new wave soul of the 1980s—have responded to the genre. At once a confessional break-up album and a critique of the whole concept of telegraphed heartache, Howl is soul with its jacket off.

JC Brooks & the Uptown Sound released "Rouse Yourself" as a single in 2013, accompanied by a music video starring Parks and Recreation star Aubrey Plaza and New Girl's Jake Johnson. Another single, "You Can't Break Me," was released in 2015, along with a music video filmed in Chicago's Uptown neighborhood during the dead of winter.

Brooks's fourth full-length album, Neon Jungle, was released in spring 2017.

== Discography ==
=== Studio albums ===
- Beat Of Our Own Drum – 2009 – Vampi Soul
- Want More – 2011 – Bloodshot Records
- Howl – 2013 – Bloodshot Records
- Neon Jungle – 2017 – Rock Ridge Music

=== Singles and EPs ===
- "I Am Trying To Break Your Heart" – 2009 – Vampi Soul
- "Baltimore Is The New Brooklyn" / "Bad News" – 2009 – Vampi Soul
- "To Love Someone (That Don't Love You)" / "Everything Will Be Fine" – 2010 – Addenda Records
- "Berry Please" / "What" – 2011 – Euclid Records
- "Get It Together" – 2011 – Rabbit Factory
- "I Got High/River" – 2012 – Bloodshot Records
- "Rouse Yourself" – 2013 – Bloodshot Records
- "Security" – 2014 – Bloodshot Records
- "You Can't Break Me" – 2015 – Bloodshot Records
