= Watchhouse =

American folk duo

- Also known as: Mandolin Orange
- Origin: Chapel Hill, North Carolina, United States
- Genres: Folk; Americana
- Years active: 2009–present
- Labels: Tiptoe Tiger Music; Yep Roc (2013-2020; 2024)
- Members: Andrew Marlin; Emily Frantz
- Website: WatchhouseBand.com

Watchhouse (formerly Mandolin Orange) is an Americana/folk duo based in Chapel Hill, North Carolina. The group was formed in 2009 in Chapel Hill, North Carolina and consists of songwriter Andrew Marlin (vocals, mandolin, guitar, banjo) and Emily Frantz (vocals, violin, guitar), who are married to each other. Watchhouse has also produced nine albums of Marlin's original works of American roots music.

== History ==
Watchhouse signed to Yep Roc Records in 2013 and have produced five albums under their umbrella, This Side of Jordan, Such Jubilee, Blindfaller, Tides of a Teardrop, and Austin City Limits Live at the Moody Theater. Marlin recorded an instrumental album, Buried In a Cape, under his own name in 2018. During the COVID-19 pandemic, Marlin recorded his second and third instrumental albums without Frantz, Witching Hour and Fable & Fire.

== Name Change ==
In April 2021, the band announced that moving forward, they would change the group's name from Mandolin Orange to Watchhouse. Of the change, Marlin said "Mandolin Orange was born out of my 21-year-old mind. The name isn't what I strive for when I write" and that Watchhouse is a name that reflects their "true intentions" as a band. Later, in July the band was part of the Newport Folk Festival.

== Appearances ==
The group has toured throughout the U.S and Europe, including appearances at Austin City Limits, South by Southwest, Edmonton Folk Music Festival, Telluride Bluegrass Festival, Newport Folk Festival, Philadelphia Folk Festival, Pickathon, Hardly Strictly Bluegrass, Rooster Walk, MerleFest, and the Omagh Bluegrass Festival. Watchhouse was the featured artist on CBS This Morning's Saturday Morning Sessions on December 7, 2019.

== Discography ==
=== Albums ===
Title	Era	Album details	Peak chart positions					Sales
Title	Era	Album details	US	US Country	US Folk	US Heat	US Rock	Sales
Quiet Little Room	Mandolin Orange	Release date: April 10, 2010; Label: Mandolin Orange	—	—	—	—	—	
Haste Make / Hard Hearted Stranger	Mandolin Orange	Release date: November 8, 2011; Label: Mandolin Orange LLC	—	—	—	—	—	
This Side of Jordan	Mandolin Orange	Release date: August 20, 2013; Label: Yep Roc Records	—	—	—	—	—	
Such Jubilee	Mandolin Orange	Release date: May 5, 2015; Label: Yep Roc Records	—	—	17	21	—	
Blindfaller	Mandolin Orange	Release date: September 30, 2016; Label: Yep Roc Records	—	—	16	7	42	
Tides of a Teardrop	Mandolin Orange	Release date: February 1, 2019; Label: Yep Roc Records	164	13	2	1	31	US: 7,500
Watchhouse	Watchhouse	Release date: August 13, 2021; Label: Tiptoe Tiger Music						
Austin City Limits Live at the Moody Theater	Watchhouse	Release date: January 12, 2024; Label: Yep Roc Records						
Rituals	Watchhouse	Release date: May 30, 2025; Label: Tiptoe Tiger Music/Thirty Tigers						
"—" denotes releases that did not chart
