= The Lemon Twigs =

American rock band

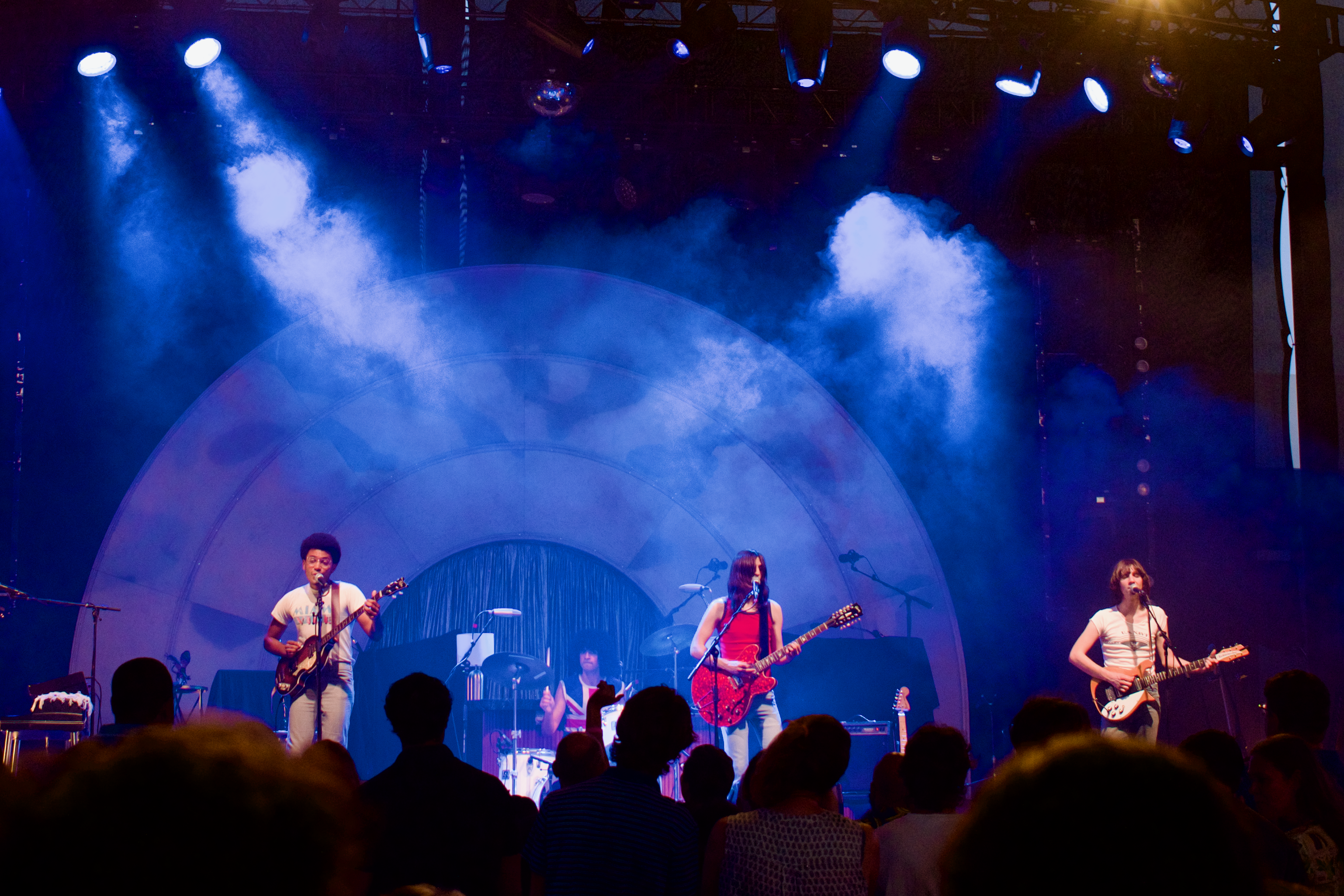
- The Lemon Twigs in 2024

Background information
- Origin: Hicksville, New York, U.S.
- Genres: Rock; pop
- Years active: 2014–present
- Labels: Captured Tracks; 4AD; Winspear
- Members: Brian D'Addario; Michael D'Addario
- Website: thelemontwigs.com

The Lemon Twigs are an American rock band from Hicksville, Long Island, New York. The duo consists of brothers Brian and Michael D'Addario. Both brothers are vocalists, songwriters and multi-instrumentalists, and during live performances they are joined by Danny Ayala (keyboards, vocals, bass) and Reza Matin (drums, vocals, guitar).

The band's music has been noted for its stylistic roots in 1960s and 1970s pop and rock music, ranging from power pop to glam rock, art rock, and jangle pop. Since their commercial debut in 2016, the Lemon Twigs have released six studio albums, one live album, and an EP. The D'Addarios have also collaborated musically with other acts, including Weyes Blood and Todd Rundgren.

== History ==
=== Early childhood ===
Brian and Michael were born two years apart from each other, both in March. Ronnie D'Addario, their father, is a musician and songwriter from Manhattan who played with Irish folk singer Tommy Makem. Susan Hall, their mother, is a neuropsychologist from Ohio who pursued acting and entertainment in her younger years. The first few years of the D'Addario brothers' lives were spent in an apartment in Flushing, Queens. The family then moved to a house in the suburbs of Long Island. The brothers were raised in a musical household and learned to play and sing at a very early age, developing an obsession with the Beatles that was passed down from their father.

=== Formation and first years ===
Brian and Michael D'Addario had extensive stage experience as children. Brian played Gavroche in Les Miserables and Flounder in The Little Mermaid on Broadway. Michael appeared in The Coast of Utopia, The Radio City Christmas Spectacular, and the 2008 production of All My Sons. Michael also appeared in a variety of television shows and films, such as John Adams on HBO, Are We There Yet? on TBS, and the 2012 films People Like Us and Sinister. The D'Addario brothers first played music together in a cover band called Members of the Press.

The Lemon Twigs were founded by the brothers while they were both students at Hicksville High School on Long Island, New York. The siblings both perform lead vocals, lead guitar, drums and other instruments. Their first release was the cassette What We Know, issued in a limited edition of 100 copies (with digital download) in 2015 by Winspear.

=== 2016–2018: Do Hollywood ===
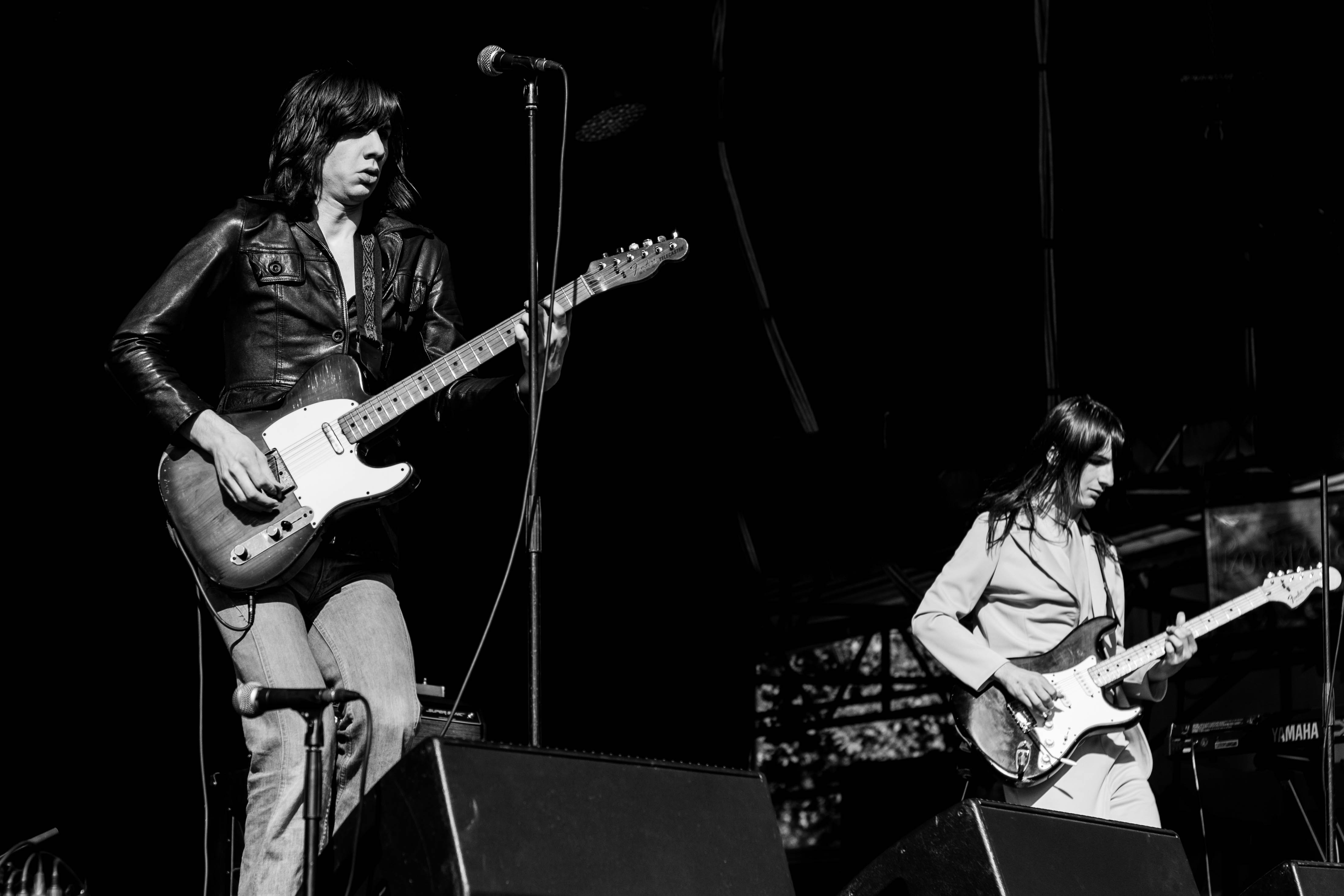
The Lemon Twigs performing at the Haldern Pop festival in Germany, 2018.

In 2014, the unsigned D'Addarios approached Jonathan Rado of Foxygen on Twitter with demo recordings in hopes of attracting interest. Rado flew the brothers out to Los Angeles to record a series of basic album tracks and spent 18 months engineering and refining the tracks. The brothers also signed with the British independent label 4AD. On the resulting album, Do Hollywood (2016), each brother took the lead on vocals and guitar on the songs he composed; during live performances, this setup was preserved, with the remaining D'Addario playing the drums, and fellow schoolmates Megan Zeankowski and Danny Ayala (who have played with the D'Addarios on and off since their youth) playing bass and keyboards, respectively. Ayala also sang backing vocals.

The Lemon Twigs served as opening act for fellow New York City/Long Island-based alt-rockers Sunflower Bean on their East Coast tour in late 2016 and performed on television programs like The Tonight Show Starring Jimmy Fallon, CBS This Morning Saturday Sessions, Conan, Jimmy Kimmel Live!, Later... with Jools Holland, and Late Night with Seth Meyers. In early 2017 it was announced that the band would play on day one of the Coachella Valley Music and Arts Festival in Indio, California on April 14, 2017. This performance saw the Twigs joined by one of the band's "favorite musicians ever, in the whole world", Todd Rundgren, to play "Couldn't I Just Tell You" from Rundgren's classic 1972 double album, Something/Anything? The Lemon Twigs released the Do Hollywood tracks "These Words" and "As Long As We're Together" as a double-A-side single, and made videos for both songs. The third single was the album opener, "I Wanna Prove to You", with a video directed by Nick Roney.

The band played at several major festivals in the summer of 2017, such as Glastonbury, Outside Lands, Lollapalooza, Austin City, and the Montreux, in addition to opening for Phoenix across the United States. The Lemon Twigs performed with Thomas Hedlund of Phoenix on drums while supporting Phoenix at the Hollywood Bowl alongside Mac DeMarco. In September 2017 the band released an EP, Brothers of Destruction, containing songs recorded during the Do Hollywood sessions.

=== 2018–2019: Go to School ===
The band's second album, Go to School, a musical about a chimpanzee raised as a human boy, was released on August 24, 2018. Singles included: "If You Give Enough," "Small Victories," and "The Fire." The album debuted at number 93 on the UK Albums Chart on September 6, 2018. The band were also announced as one of the support acts for Arctic Monkeys' 2018 tour in support of their album Tranquility Base Hotel & Casino. Appearing on the album were Todd Rundgren and Big Star drummer Jody Stephens.

Prior to beginning their run of shows promoting Go to School, the group underwent a number of personnel changes. Both Megan Zeankowski and Danny Ayala were replaced by Daryl Johns (bass), Andres Valbuena (drums) and Tommaso Taddonio (keyboards).

=== 2020–2022: Songs for the General Public ===
On March 2, 2020, the band announced that Songs for the General Public, their third studio album, was scheduled to be released on May 1, 2020. However, due to complications of the COVID-19 pandemic, the album's release was changed to August 21, 2020. Singles included: "The One," "Moon," "Only A Fool," and "No One Holds You (Closer Than the One You Haven't Met)."

=== 2023–2024: Everything Harmony and A Dream Is All We Know ===
In March 2023, the D'Addarios backed Zombies singer Colin Blunstone at the South by Southwest festival in Austin, Texas.

On May 5, 2023, the Twigs released their fourth album, Everything Harmony, through Captured Tracks. It was self-produced by the band and received positive reviews from critics. The album produced the singles "Corner of My Eye," "In My Head," "Anytime of Day," and "Every Day Is the Worst Day of My Life." The band supported the album release with a tour of North America and western Europe, concluding in London on June 1, 2023.

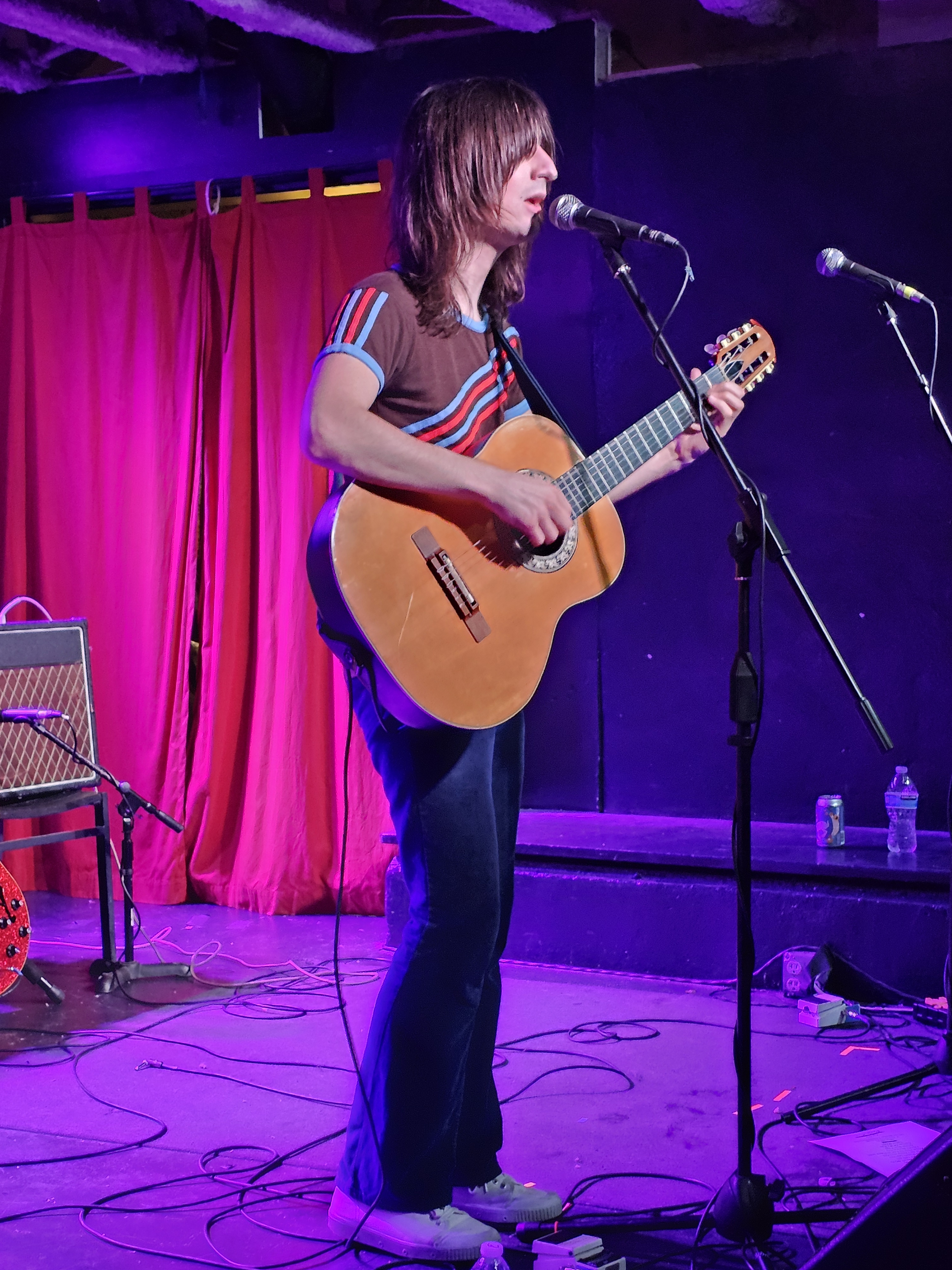
Brian D'Addario performs on classical guitar in 2024.

A Dream Is All We Know is the band's fifth studio album, released on May 3, 2024. It was preceded by four singles, the first being "power-pop anthem" "My Golden Years" on January 2, 2024. The album and album artwork were subsequently announced on The Tonight Show Starring Jimmy Fallon on January 31, 2024. The three succeeding singles for the album were: "They Don't Know How To Fall In Place", "A Dream Is All I Know", and "How Can I Love Her More".

In May 2024, the Lemon Twigs began a tour of North America and Europe in support of A Dream Is All We Know, including a string of shows opening for Lake Street Dive and a main stage performance at the Primavera Sound festival in Barcelona. On August 9, they performed at San Francisco's annual Outside Lands festival. On September 1, they played the End of the Road Festival in southwest England.

=== 2025–present: Till the Morning, Look for Your Mind!, and other projects ===
On February 19, 2025, Brian D'Addario released a single, "Till the Morning", from a solo album of the same name released on March 20. Despite the solo billing, Michael D'Addario co-produced the album, contributed backing vocals, and co-wrote two of the songs. Former Beach Boys collaborator Stephen Kalinich also wrote the lyrics for two songs. D'Addario described the album's sound as "country baroque".

In October 2025, the Lemon Twigs released "Not Today", a cover of a song written by their father, Ronnie D'Addario. The brothers helped their father record and produce an album of his songs, called Written by Ronnie D'Addario, released on November 28, 2025. The album features contributions from Darian Sahanaja, Mac DeMarco, Sean Ono Lennon, Todd Rundgren, and Matt Jardine.

On November 25, 2025, the Twigs released two new songs, "I've Got A Broken Heart" and "Friday (I'm Gonna Love You)". On December 17, they released a Christmas single they recorded with Tchotchke, called "Tchotchkes".

On March 11, 2026, the Twigs released a new single, "I Just Can't Get Over Losing You", and announced they would release a new album, Look for Your Mind!, in May. In support of the release, the band embarked on a tour of North America, Japan, and Europe scheduled to run through October.

== Collaborations and production work ==
The Lemon Twigs played on Foxygen's 2017 album Hang, credited as playing drums, percussion, acoustic and electric guitar, bass guitar, piano and organ. They also were players on Weyes Blood's Titanic Rising, released in 2019 via Sub Pop records. Michael played drums on three of the tracks, while Brian played guitar, bass, piano and synthesizer on five tracks; he is also credited with production on "Mirror Forever" and providing the string arrangement to album opener "A Lot's Gonna Change", and instrumental closer "Nearer To Thee." The Lemon Twigs performed on many tracks for Tim Heidecker's album Fear of Death, released on September 25, 2020, alongside Weyes Blood. They are credited for playing bass guitar, acoustic and electric guitar, drums, vocals, and mellotron. The Twigs collaborated with Todd Rundgren on the song "I'm Leaving" from Rundgren's 2022 album, Space Force. They provided backing vocals on Chris Stamey's 2025 single, "I'd Be Lost Without You".

The Twigs have toured and recorded with and produced the band Tchotchke, a New York–based rock trio in which both the D'Addarios' girlfriends play. They also produced and played on two tracks from the 2025 solo record from their touring member and friend Danny Ayala, Only Fools Love Again.

The brothers co-wrote two tracks on Thundercat's 2026 album, Distracted, and produced one of them.

== Style ==
The Lemon Twigs' musical style has been described as indie rock, power pop, glam rock, indie pop, baroque rock, art rock, and jangle pop. In a 2024 interview, band member Michael D'Addario described the band's sound as fundamentally "pop rock. ... It's not always power pop and it's certainly not always glam rock. ... The through line would be pop structures and rock-based instrumentation." Michael cited the Beatles and the Beach Boys as their ultimate musical influences, adding that their other musical influences were in turn inspired by those bands. (The brothers jokingly refer to this mashup of Beatles and Beach Boys sounds as a genre called "Mersey Beach".)

In 2016, The Times characterized the Lemon Twigs' early sound as "a modern-day band combining the melodic, harmony-rich soft rock of Wings and Supertramp, the underground cool of Big Star and the Ramones, and the theatricality of Broadway musicals." The Guardian cited the "humbling beauty of their songs" and their "sumptuous harmonies." A number of artists have publicly expressed admiration for the Twigs, including pop musicians Elton John, the Zombies, Dan and Justin Hawkins, Boy George, Gary Brooker, Iggy Pop, Todd Rundgren, Flea, Gerard Way, Questlove, Alice Cooper, Michael McDonald, Jack Antonoff, as well as game designer Hideo Kojima.

The D'Addarios have drawn notice from music critics for their strong preference for analog recording methods—a preference shared by their mentor and first producer, Jonathan Rado of Foxygen. This analog approach has led the D'Addarios to consciously structure their albums with the technical limitations of vinyl LPs in mind. Foxygen also inspired the Lemon Twigs to mix their records with a vintage, less "blown out" sound; according to Brian D'Addario, "Foxygen was kinda one of the first groups we heard that didn't really abide by ... modern mixing principles. ... Something kind of clicked with us."

== Band members ==
Current members

- Brian D'Addario – vocals, guitar, bass, keyboards, drums, trumpet, cello (2014–present)
- Michael D'Addario – vocals, guitar, bass, keyboards, drums, percussion (2014–present)

Touring members

- Danny Ayala – keyboards, vocals, bass (2014–2017, 2023–present)
- Reza Matin – drums, vocals, guitar, bass (2023–present)

Former touring members

- Daryl Johns – bass, vocals (2018–2021)
- Tommaso Taddonio – keyboards (2018–2019)
- Andres Valbuena – drums (2018–2021)
- Megan Zeankowski – bass (2014–2017)
- Will Berman – drums, guitar, keyboards (2022)
- James Richardson – bass, synth, vocals (2021–2022)

== Discography ==
=== Studio albums ===
- What We Know (2015) (limited release)
- Do Hollywood (2016)
- Go to School (2018)
- Songs for the General Public (2020)
- Everything Harmony (2023)
- A Dream Is All We Know (2024)
- Look for Your Mind! (2026)

=== Live albums ===
- The Lemon Twigs Live (2020)

=== EPs ===
- Brothers of Destruction (2017)

=== Singles ===
- "These Words"/"As Long as We're Together" (2016)
- "I Wanna Prove to You" (2017)
- "Night Song" (2017)
- "Why Didn't You Say That?" (2017)
- "Foolin' Around"/"Tailor Made" (2018)
- "If You Give Enough" (2018)
- "Small Victories" (2018)
- "The Fire" (2018)
- "The One" (2020)
- "Moon" (2020)
- "Live in Favor of Tomorrow" (2020)
- "No One Holds You Closer (Than The One You Haven’t Met)" (2020)
- "Corner of My Eye" (2023)
- "Any Time of Day" (2023)
- "In My Head" (2023)
- "Every Day Is the Worst Day of My Life" (2023)
- "My Golden Years" (2024)
- "They Don't Know How to Fall in Place" (2024)
- "A Dream Is All I Know" (2024)
- "How Can I Love Her More?" (2024)
- "I've Got A Broken Heart"/"Friday (I’m Gonna Love You)" (2025)
- "Tchotchkes" (2025)
- "I Just Can't Get Over Losing You" (2026)
- "2 or 3" (2026)
