= Everything Harmony =

Studio album by the Lemon Twigs
- Released: May 5, 2023
- Recorded: January–October 2021
- Studio: The Music Building, Midtown Manhattan; Hyde Street, San Francisco; The Lemon Twigs' Studio, NYC
- Genre: Power pop; baroque pop; jangle pop; soft rock
- Length: 48:00
- Label: Captured Tracks
- Producer: The Lemon Twigs

The Lemon Twigs chronology
Songs for the General Public (2020)	Everything Harmony (2023)	A Dream Is All We Know (2024)

Singles from Everything Harmony
- 1. "Corner Of My Eye" Released: January 3, 2023; 2. "Any Time of Day" Released: February 13, 2023; 3. "In My Head" Released: March 15, 2023; 4. "Every Day Is the Worst Day of My Life" Released: April 13, 2023

Everything Harmony is the fourth studio album by American rock band the Lemon Twigs, released on May 5, 2023, through Captured Tracks. It was self-produced by the band and received positive reviews from music critics. Starting in January, the album was preceded by the singles "Corner of My Eye", "Any Time of Day", "In My Head", and "Every Day is the Worst Day of My Life".

== Composition and recording ==
According to band member Michael D'Addario, the Lemon Twigs constructed Everything Harmony around several ballads that his brother Brian wrote. In another interview, Michael said, "Brian had composed these haunting melodies, and it felt appropriate to write lyrics that were delicate and revealing." Among the artists the band cited for musical inspiration on Everything Harmony were the Beach Boys, Arthur Russell, Simon and Garfunkel, Curtis Mayfield, the Left Banke and Television in addition to more contemporary influences such as the Pastels and Elliott Smith that, in Michael's view, 'used certain melodies that I just don't think people before that were using'; reviewers also noted influence from the Bee Gees, the Byrds, James Taylor, and Teenage Fanclub.

Everything Harmony's early sessions took place in Manhattan's Music Building, which proved unsuitable for recording the album's acoustic ballads. The brothers then relocated to Hyde Street Studios in San Francisco to finish recording the album.

== Critical reception ==
Professional ratings
Aggregate scores
Source	Rating
AnyDecentMusic?	7.9/10
Metacritic	87/100
Review scores
Source	Rating
AllMusic	4/5 stars
The Guardian	5/5 stars
The Line of Best Fit	7/10
NME	4/5 stars
PopMatters	8/10
Under the Radar	8/10 stars

Everything Harmony received a score of 87 out of 100 based on 12 critics' reviews on review aggregator Metacritic, indicating "universal acclaim". Connor Shelton of The Line of Best Fit stated that the duo "push[ed] themselves toward intriguing new paths" on the album, and while the "first third of the LP shows a band more focused than ever, the lack of playfulness proves a detriment going into the middle chunk" of the album. PopMatters wrote that "their new batch of songs is so derivative of the early to mid-1970s that on first listen to it, it can be hard to hear past the influences", but that the band "echo, and, at times, even improve on those influences with such convincing skill and ebullient spirit that they demand we take them more seriously". Erica Campbell of NME described Everything Harmony as "a melodic and imaginative romp" on which they make "a sound of their own". Campbell added: "when you consider that the album was recorded, produced and engineered solely by the D'Addario brothers, it adds even more weight to the fact that they could create songs that harken back to classics without sounding too derivative".

Reviewing the album for Under the Radar, Ian Rushbury found it to be "not a radical departure from their delightfully rear facing sound" and the duo "have a simpler approach [as] the music they like is reflected in the songs they write, it just happens to be from an era which the cool kids haven't found yet". Ben Beaumont-Thomas of The Guardian opined that the duo "have never mined the past more effectively than on this fourth album", writing that their "biggest touchstone is the beautifully harmonised existential dread of the Beach Boys post-Pet Sounds flop era: rarely has stark despair (one song is called Every Day Is the Worst Day of My Life) sounded so lovely". Fred Thomas of AllMusic felt that the album has the duo "changing directions yet again, turning the volume down and exploring a more sentimental side of their '70s-informed songwriting style", with its "especially gentle songs" like "Any Time of Day" demonstrating "the band's progression the most".

Anthony Fantano rated Everything Harmony as his 10th-favorite album of 2023.

== Commercial performance ==
The album appeared at number 78 on the midweek UK Albums Chart dated May 8, 2023.

== Track listing ==
All tracks are written by the Lemon Twigs.

Everything Harmony track listing
No.	Title	Lead vocals	Length
1.	"When Winter Comes Around"	Brian	4:42
2.	"In My Head"	Michael	3:18
3.	"Corner of My Eye"	Brian	3:19
4.	"Any Time of Day"	Brian	2:51
5.	"What You Were Doing"	Michael	4:33
6.	"I Don't Belong to Me"	Michael	2:59
7.	"Every Day Is the Worst Day of My Life"	Michael	3:25
8.	"What Happens to a Heart"	Brian	3:55
9.	"Still It's Not Enough"	Michael	3:42
10.	"Born to Be Lonely"	Brian	4:26
11.	"Ghost Run Free"	Brian and Michael	3:09
12.	"Everything Harmony"	Michael and Brian	3:43
13.	"New to Me"	Brian	3:58
Total length:			48:00

== Personnel ==
Credits adapted from Everything Harmony album liner notes.

The Lemon Twigs

- Brian D'Addario – guitar, bass, drums (11), piano, electric piano, harpsichord, organ, ARP Quartet, ARP Solina, vibraphone, mandolin, string arrangements, horn arrangements, vocals
- Michael D'Addario – guitar, bass, drums (2, 4, 5, 8, 10), piano, percussion, horn arrangements, vocals

Additional musicians

- Andres Valbuena – drums (3, 6, 8, 9)
- Daryl Johns – upright bass (3, 6, 9), electric bass (8)
- Kevin Basko – acoustic and electric guitar (8)
- Cameron Carrella – euphonium (10)
- Alicia Mastromonaco – French horn (6, 8, 10)

The Friction Quartet

- Otis Harriel – violin
- Yuri Kye – violin
- Rachyl Martinez – viola
- Doug Machiz – cello

Production

- Brian D'Addario – production, mixing
- Michael D'Addario – producer, engineer, mixing
- Rias Reed – engineer
- Sam Fickinger – assistant engineer
- Paul D. Millar – mastering

Artwork

- Eva Chambers – art direction, photography
- Michael D'Addario – art direction

== Charts ==
Chart performance for Everything Harmony
Chart (2023)	Peak position
French Albums (SNEP)	154
Scottish Albums (OCC)	6
UK Independent Albums (OCC)	6
