= Eaux Claires =

Music and arts festival in Eau Claire, Wisconsin, U.S.

- Genre: Indie, rock, art rock
- Locations: Foster Farms, Eau Claire, Wisconsin, U.S.
- Years active: 2015–2018, 2026–
- Founders: Aaron Dessner, Justin Vernon
- Most recent: July 24–25, 2026
- Website: eauxclaires.com

Eaux Claires, also known as the Eaux Claires Music & Arts Festival, is a two-day music and arts festival that takes place in Eau Claire, Wisconsin, founded by Aaron Dessner of the National and Justin Vernon of Bon Iver.

Originally running from 2015 through 2018, the festival went on indefinite hiatus the following year. In late 2025 the official social media accounts announced that the festival would make a return July 24–25, 2026.

Vernon described as the festival as the antithesis of "all the things I hate at festivals: really loud music all the time, no breaks, bad food, all that kind of thing."

Past performers at the festival included Bon Iver, The National, Paul Simon, Chance the Rapper, Lizzo, Indigo Girls, Wilco, Sufjan Stevens, Erykah Badu, Spoon, Blind Boys of Alabama, Sturgill Simpson, Doomtree, Vince Staples, Tenement and James Blake.

== 2015 ==
During its first year, music started on Thursday afternoon with campground performances from several artists, including sets from Eaux Claires "narrator" Michael Perry and Phil Cook and his Guitarheels band (including Amelia Meath from Sylvan Esso).

On Friday, attendees entered the festival grounds under an Eric Rieger art piece and through the giant letters of the Big Eaux sign. On a side stage each day, the festival opened with a performance of Ragnar Kjartansson's Forever Love, a collaborative song cycle including costumed performances from Bryce and Aaron Dessner.

The National closed out the main stage Friday evening followed by late night sets at the uphill stage, including Lizzo and Marijuana Deathsquads. The second night was headlined by Sufjan Stevens and Bon Iver, who closed the festival playing songs from both of his albums along with many guest artists.

Creative Director Michael Brown described the festival's intent as "each person having a unique experience that they wouldn’t have at a concert or a normal performance. It’s about giving and taking and interacting with that community." Logistically the festival leveraged much of the regional infrastructure in place for the Country Jam music festival, including the Foster Farms location and the Whispering Pines campground, with school buses used as shuttles between the two, while expanding the venue to include art domes and smaller stages in an uphill field previously unused by prior festivals, specifically designed to be "a little journey up to this whole area, it cleanses your palate in a way to go into a different mindset".

== 2016 ==
The 2016 festival expanded the ideas of the first year, adding more bands and re-configuring the grounds. A small forest stage and a second amplified stage were added atop the hill, while the downhill area changes included retiring the children's stage. The uphill domes of the first year were replaced by an air-conditioned headphones dome. The Thursday night campground performances were replaced by a ticketed show in downtown Eau Claire by Phil Cook and the Guitarheels, who also played the festival itself.

Notable performances in 2016 included the live premiere of Bon Iver's 22, A Million and the only live performance of the Day of the Dead collaboration based on the tribute charity album. Also new in 2016 was the inclusion of an organ downhill where musicians would play unannounced performances in-between sets, and other hidden art pieces scattered around the grounds that festival goers had to seek out.

A common theme in both years of the festival was collaboration, including in the first year The Blind Boys of Alabama playing with the Lone Bellow, Amy Ray of Indigo Girls performing with Phil Cook, Sufjan Stevens playing with The National, No BS Brass Band and Bryce Dessner playing with Sufjan Stevens, Vernon playing with his old bandmate Aero Flynn and The National, and in the second year Lucius and The Staves making multiple guest appearances.

== 2017 ==
In early February 2017 the creative team announced an overhaul for the third iteration of the festival via a bound book named "Troix". Sent to pre-sale ticket buyers, it included both the lineup and artist statements about how the festival had evolved, with a video including festival narrator Michael Perry laying at the outset that "the river doesn't plan its course ... it finds its course", likely pointing to both internal and external forces.

One of the largest changes in 2017 included decreasing the number of stages, plus halving the number of billed bands, while bringing back several musicians from prior years—including Jenny Lewis, Phil Cook, and Vernon—under a new Artists-In-Residence cohort.

In an April 2017 interview Dessner described the idea that the festival had developed into "anti-music-festival festival", having already eschewed many of the big festival tentpoles such as dedicated VIP viewing areas, branded stages, and big-font delineated headliners. Ostensibly, resident artists were an extension of the idea in that they would be “roaming the grounds performing where and when they see fit, and joining other artists onstage, prompted or unprompted.”

Scheduled performances included Paul Simon, Chance the Rapper, and Wilco, Feist's only scheduled festival performance of 2017, a new Justin Vernon and Aaron Dessner collaboration entitled Big Red Machine, and a musical tribute to John Prine including Prine. Several acts including Francis and the Lights, Sylvan Esso, and many of the Artist-In-Residence such as The Staves returned for their third year (also Sam Amidon, S.Carey, yMusic, Chris Rosenau, Bryce Dessner) and a few returning for their second (Jenny Lewis, Midnite Express).

Additional changes included the uphill area no longer being used (due to noise complaints from nearby homes), a revamping and expansion of the forest trail stages, and very little schedule overlap between band set times. Common to prior years the focus on music-plus-arts continued, with an online-only Troix II book outlining many of the planned pieces including the Pickup Music Project's community music space and several visual art installations.

Outside of the festival proper the 2017 event featured expanded Thursday night ticketed shows in downtown Eau Claire, including a street show OXBEAUX headlined by Vernon and Phil Cook (performing his third pre-Eaux) as part of The Shouting Matches.

== 2018 ==
On November 15, 2017 the fourth edition of the festival was announced. Tickets went on sale immediately, alongside a 29-minute audio file "Please Listen #1" that included voice recordings and music clips. A second audio collection called Please Listen #2 was released alongside several Instagram posts with videos featuring discussions about The National and Sharon Van Etten performing.

The organizers later revealed that there would be no "marketed lineup" for this fourth year of the festival, though through his Twitter feed Justin declared many of the bands from the Please Listen podcasts as being highly likely, while later making note that they've not "announced anything". The week before the festival started Vernon noted "you could find out basically everyone who's playing if you really wanted to", and soon after the official Eaux Claires app started publishing playlist that seemed to confirm many of the hinted artists, though the official release of the lineup didn't occur until the day of the festival.

The final band list included headliners The National, Big Red Machine, Pussy Riot, and PEOPLE Mixtape (a collaborative covers/dance project led by Vernon). Additional acts included main stage sets from Wye Oak, Serengeti, Sharon Van Etten, Kevin Morby, Moses Sumney, Noname, Phoebe Bridgers, with acoustic performances from Hiss Golden Messenger, Dirty Projectors, and late night sets from Low, Mouse on Mars, and Marijuana Deathsquads. Additionally Phoebe Bridgers, Julien Baker, and Gordi regularly made appearances similar to 2017's Artists in Residence program.

Reception for 2018 was mixed, with some fans enthusiastically embracing the model and others frustrated by the final product. In the press the reviews were also mixed, focusing on both logistical and creative components including the lack of big-name acts compared to prior years, multiple sets ending early including Big Red Machine, and scheduling concerns that led to some sets being "drowned out" by music from other stages. Well-received elements included a hidden DJ booth in the woods, and The National's headlining set.

During the festival, a booklet was released with an interview festival organizer Michael Brown, declaring: "...We don’t want more people. We want less [sic] people."

Expanding the pre-festival offerings in 2018 included downtown ticketed Prex Claires and OXBEAUX II events including artists such as Hiss Golden Messenger, Spank Rock, and Mouse on Mars.

== 2019-2025 hiatus ==
On December 10, 2018, the festival organizers revealed that the festival would "take a year off" for 2019, with a planned relaunch of the festival on a different site with a new format in 2020. "Ultimately, we want a better experience – not just for us, but for everyone."

In October 2019, in lieu of a full Eaux Claires festival, Justin and Aaron announced Eaux Claires Hiver as "a Winter residency ... in preparation for Eaux Claire V next summer". Taking place in November of that year at various downtown Eau Claire venues, ticketing was limited to 500 and artists included many Eaux Claires regulars such as Veron, Dessner, S. Carey, Polica, and Jon Hopkins. Spread over four nights the events included Vernon and Dessner performing in-development Big Red Machine's tracks, a Prince tribute, and a conversation with Ani Difranco

The 2020 festival plans, which had received permission to move downtown rather than occur at the Country Jam location, were cancelled due to the COVID-19 pandemic, and no further announcements were made about future events until late 2025.

== 2026 ==
On December 12, 2025, organizers announced that, after an eight-year hiatus, the festival will be returning July 24–25 of 2026, and in early 2026 confirmed that it would be held at Carson Park. The 2026 lineup included Aaron & Fred, Aimee Mann, Bizhiki, Bon Dylan, Hotline TNT, Jon Cleary & the Absolute Monster Gentlemen, The Union, Dijon, Gash, Gully Boys, Julianna Barwick & Matt Lattimore, Known MPLS, Larry Goldings Trio, Monica Martin, Nathan & the Zydeco Cha Chas, Samia, and Revelation.
