= Flamingo Road Tour =

2010–11 concert tour by Brandon Flowers

- Tour by Brandon Flowers
- Promotional poster for the tour
- Associated album: Flamingo
- Start date: August 14, 2010
- End date: July 16, 2011
- Legs: 5
- No. of shows: 31 in North America; 33 in Europe; 64 total

Brandon Flowers concert chronology
- Flamingo Road Tour (2010–11); The Desired Effect Tour (2015)

The Flamingo Road Tour (commonly known as the Flamingo Tour) was the first solo concert tour by American singer-songwriter Brandon Flowers, frontman of the rock band the Killers. Visiting North America and Europe, the tour supported his debut album, Flamingo, released in September 2010. The tour has received praise from both spectators and critics alike, including being named one of the "Best Shows of the Summer" and "'Must See Fall Tours" by Spin.

== Background ==
After a European run, Flowers returned to the US in November for a national tour in 2,000-seat theaters. Tickets went on sale during the second week of September.

Bless 'em, they are devoted. I see some of the same faces every night. It's great to have the support and I realize that comes out of the love that they had for the Killers [but] I feel embarrassed to do some of the same things, even though it's new for 95% of the audience

Shortly after announcing his band would take a brief hiatus, Flowers began to record his first solo record. After his first single "Crossfire" gained momentum, Flowers announced a short club tour to help promote his forthcoming album. The tour received high praise from many critics and was expanded into a full length tour into Europe and North America. The namesake of the tour derives from the iconic Flamingo Road in Flowers hometown of Las Vegas—where he worked as a bellhop at the historic Flamingo Las Vegas. He mentions, "A lot of my life took place on Flamingo [Road]. It's part of Vegas mythology, and now it's part of my own mythology […] That's my 'hood.'" Flowers' band, The Killers paid tribute to Las Vegas with their second album, Sam's Town, named for Sam's Town Hotel and Gambling Hall, which is located on E Flamingo Road in Sunrise Manor.

== Setlist ==
These are sample setlists. They are not intended to represent all shows from the tour.

North America

August 15, 2010

1. "On The Floor"
2. "Crossfire"
3. "Magdalena"
4. "Bette Davis Eyes" (Jackie DeShannon cover)
5. "Jilted Lovers & Broken Hearts"
6. "Was It Something I Said?"
7. "Hard Enough"
8. "Losing Touch" (The Killers song)
9. "Swallow It"
10. "Playing with Fire"

November 9, 2010

1. "On The Floor"
2. "Crossfire"
3. "Magdalena"
4. "Bette Davis Eyes" (Jackie DeShannon cover)
5. "Jilted Lovers & Broken Hearts"
6. "Welcome to Fabulous Las Vegas"
7. "Was It Something I Said?"
8. "Hard Enough"
9. "Losing Touch" (The Killers song)
10. "Swallow It"
11. "Only the Young"
12. "Playing with Fire"

Encore

13. "The Clock Was Tickin'"
14. "When You Were Young" (The Killers song)
Europe

September 8, 2010

1. "On The Floor"
2. "Crossfire"
3. "Magdalena"
4. "Bette Davis Eyes" (Jackie DeShannon cover)
5. "Jilted Lovers & Broken Hearts"
6. "Was It Something I Said?"
7. "Hard Enough"
8. "Are You Lonesome Tonight?" (Charles Hart cover)
9. "Losing Touch" (The Killers song)
10. "Swallow It"
11. "Playing with Fire"

Encore

12. "When You Were Young" (The Killers song)

September 22, 2010

1. "On The Floor"
2. "Magdalena"
3. "Bette Davis Eyes" (Jackie DeShannon cover)
4. "Jilted Lovers & Broken Hearts"
5. "Was It Something I Said?"
6. "Only the Young"
7. "Right Behind You"
8. "When You Were Young" (The Killers song)
9. "Hard Enough"
10. "Losing Touch" (The Killers song)
11. "Swallow It"
12. "Playing with Fire"

Encore

13. "If God Will Send His Angels" (U2 cover)
14. "Crossfire"

=== Additional notes ===
- During the concert at the Hammerstein Ballroom in New York City, New York, Flowers performed "Read My Mind" and "Mr. Brightside" in lieu of "The Clock Was Tickin" and "When You Were Young". Additionally, "Only the Young" was performed during the encore.
- During the concert at the O2 Academy in Liverpool, England, Flowers performed "Helter Skelter" by The Beatles during the encore instead of "The Clock Was Tickin'" which was played on every other UK date (except London)
- During the concert at the O2 Academy Brixton in London, England, Flowers performed "Only the Young", "Human", and "Mr. Brightside" during the encore alongside Stuart Price.
- During the concert at The Wiltern Theater in Los Angeles, California, Flowers performed "Roxanne" alongside Andy Summers during the encore.
- During the concert at the Fox Oakland Theater in Oakland, California, Flowers performed "Side" alongside Fran Healy during the encore.
- During the concert at The Stone Pony in Asbury Park, New Jersey, Flowers performed "Promised Land" by Bruce Springsteen during the encore.
- During the concert at Where The Action Is in Gothenburg, Sweden, Flowers performed "Reptile" by The Church.
- During the concert at the Coachella Festival in Indio, California, Flowers performed "Read My Mind" and "Mr. Brightside" alongside Dave Keuning and Mark Stoermer from the Killers.

== Tour dates ==
Date	City	Country	Venue	Opening act
North America I
August 14, 2010	Las Vegas	United States	Shimmer Cabaret	—
August 17, 2010	Los Angeles	United States	The Troubadour	—
August 19, 2010	San Francisco	United States	Slim's	—
August 23, 2010	Chicago	United States	Park West	—
August 25, 2010	Toronto	Canada	Mod Club	—
August 26, 2010	New York City	United States	Highline Ballroom	—
Europe I
September 8, 2010	London	England	Relentless Garage	—
September 22, 2010	Dublin	Ireland	The Academy	—
September 23, 2010^{[A]}	Dublin	Ireland	The Academy	—
September 26, 2010	Cologne	Germany	E-Werk	—
September 27, 2010	Brussels	Belgium	Ancienne Belgique	—
September 28, 2010	Amsterdam	Netherlands	Paradiso	—
September 29, 2010	Paris	France	Cabaret Sauvage	—
October 1, 2010	Berlin	Germany	Huxleys Neue Welt	—
October 3, 2010	Zürich	Switzerland	Kaufleuten	—
October 4, 2010	Milan	Italy	Discoteca Alcatraz Milano	—
October 5, 2010	Rome	Italy	Circolo Degli Artisti	—
October 8, 2010	Barcelona	Spain	Razzmatazz	—
October 9, 2010	Madrid	Spain	La Riviera Madrid	—
October 12, 2010	Glasgow	Scotland	O_{2} Academy Glasgow	—
October 13, 2010	Leeds	England	O_{2} Academy Leeds	—
October 14, 2010	Liverpool	England	O_{2} Academy Liverpool	—
October 16, 2010	Manchester	England	Manchester Academy	—
October 17, 2010	London	England	London Forum	—
October 18, 2010	Birmingham	England	Digbeth Institute	—
October 19, 2010	London	England	O_{2} Academy Brixton	—
North America II
November 9, 2010	Pomona	United States	Pomona Fox Theater	Fran Healy
November 10, 2010	Los Angeles	United States	Wiltern Theatre	Fran Healy
November 11, 2010	Oakland	United States	Fox Oakland Theatre	Fran Healy
November 13, 2010	Portland	United States	Roseland Theater	Fran Healy
November 14, 2010	Seattle	United States	Showbox SoDo	Fran Healy
November 15, 2010	Vancouver	Canada	Commodore Ballroom	Fran Healy
November 17, 2010	Salt Lake City	United States	The Depot	Fran Healy
November 18, 2010	Denver	United States	Ogden Theatre	Fran Healy
November 20, 2010	Lawrence	United States	Liberty Hall	Fran Healy
November 21, 2010	Minneapolis	United States	First Avenue	Fran Healy
November 23, 2010	Chicago	United States	Riviera Theatre	Fran Healy
November 24, 2010	Royal Oak	United States	Royal Oak Music Theatre	Fran Healy
November 26, 2010	Boston	United States	House of Blues	Fran Healy
November 27, 2010	Atlantic City	United States	House of Blues	Fran Healy
November 28, 2010	Philadelphia	United States	Electric Factory	Fran Healy
November 29, 2010	Washington, D.C.	United States	9:30 Club	Fran Healy
December 1, 2010	Asbury Park	United States	The Stone Pony	Fran Healy
December 2, 2010	New York City	United States	Hammerstein Ballroom	Fran Healy
December 3, 2010	Montreal	Canada	Club Soda	Fran Healy
December 4, 2010	Toronto	Canada	Sound Academy	Fran Healy
North America III
April 10, 2011	Guadalajara	Mexico	Teatro Estudio Cavaret	Transfer
April 11, 2011	Mexico City	Mexico	Jose Cuervo Salon	Transfer
April 14, 2011	San Diego	United States	House of Blues	Transfer
April 15, 2011	Indio	United States	Coachella Valley Music and Arts Festival	Transfer
April 16, 2011	Las Vegas	United States	House of Blues	Transfer
Europe II
June 28, 2011	Gothenburg	Sweden	Azaleadalen	—
June 29, 2011	Arendal	Norway	Tromoya	—
July 1, 2011	Paddock Wood	England	Hopp Farm	—
July 3, 2011	Werchter	Belgium	Werchter Park	—
July 5, 2011	Offenbach	Germany	Capitol	—
July 6, 2011	Tilburg	Netherlands	Poppodium	—
July 7, 2011	Luxembourg	Luxembourg	Den Atelier	—
July 9, 2011	Naas	Ireland	Punchestown Racecourse	—
July 10, 2011	Kinross	Scotland	Balado	—
July 12, 2011	St Austell	England	The Eden Project	—
July 14, 2011	Bern	Switzerland	Gurten	—
July 15, 2011	Valencia	Spain	Benicàssim Castellón	—
July 16, 2011	Sesimbra	Portugal	Meco	—

Festivals and other miscellaneous performances
^{A} This performance was a part of Arthur's Day.

=== Box office score data ===
Venue	City	Tickets sold / available	Gross revenue
Shimmer Cabaret	Las Vegas	390 / 390 (100%)	$10,725
Park West	Chicago	1,000 / 1,000 (100%)	$25,000
Fox Theater Pomona	Pomona	2,000 / 2,000 (100%)	$55,043
Riviera Theatre	Chicago	1,466 / 2,500 (59%)	$42,514
9:30 Club	Washington, D.C.	1,200 / 1,200 (100%)	$36,000
Club Soda	Montreal	865 / 865 (100%)	$25,769
Total		6,921 / 7,955 (87%)	$195,051
