= One of These Days =

One of These Days may refer to:

== Songs ==
- "One of These Days" (instrumental), a 1971 song by Pink Floyd from the album Meddle
- "One of These Days" (Marcus Hummon song), a 1995 song later covered by Tim McGraw
- "One of These Days" (Emmylou Harris song), a 1976 song by Emmylou Harris from the album Elite Hotel
- "These Boots Are Made for Walkin'", a 1966 song by Nancy Sinatra, covered by Operation Ivy as "One of These Days"
- The chorus of "Sub-culture" (song), a 1985 song by New Order
- "One of These Days", a song released by 78 Saab from The Bells Line
- "One of These Days", a song released by The 88 from This Must Be Love
- "One of These Days", a song released by American Steel from the album Rogue's March
- "One of These Days", a song released by Architects from the Hollow Crown
- "One of These Days", a song released by Barry Manilow from the self-titled album
- "One of These Days", a song released by Caliban from The Opposite from Within
- "One of These Days", a song released by Camper Van Beethoven from Our Beloved Revolutionary Sweetheart
- "One of These Days", a song released by Charley Pride from Songs of Pride...Charley That Is
- "One of These Days", a song released by David Hopkins from Running with Knives
- "One of These Days", a song released by David Ruffin, B-side of the single "I'm in Love"
- "One of These Days", a song released by Doves from Some Cities
- "One of These Days", a song released by Drive-By Truckers from Pizza Deliverance
- "One of These Days", a song released by FFH from I Want to Be Like You
- "One of These Days", a song released by Gerard McMahon from the film Spring Break
- "One of These Days", a song released by The Grapes from Private Stock
- "One of These Days", a song released by Imani Coppola from Chupacabra
- "One of These Days", a song released by Jill Sobule from Pink Pearl
- "One of These Days", a song released by John Lee Hooker from That's My Story
- "One of These Days", a song released by LeAnn Rimes from I Need You
- "One of These Days", a song released by Mark Wills from Loving Every Minute
- "One of These Days", a song released by Marvin Gaye from Marvin Gaye Recorded Live on Stage
- "One of These Days", a song released by Matthew E. White from Big Inner
- "One of These Days", a song released by Michelle Branch from Hotel Paper
- "One of These Days", a song released by Michelle Wright from Strong
- "One of These Days", a song released by Mose Allison from The Word from Mose
- "One of These Days", a song released by Nanci Griffith from The Last of the True Believers
- "One of These Days", a song released by Neil Young from Harvest Moon
- "One of These Days", a song released by New Monsoon from Downstream
- "One of These Days", a song released by Olly Murs from Right Place Right Time
- "One of These Days", a song released by Owen from At Home with Owen
- "One of These Days", a song released by Paul McCartney from McCartney II
- "One of These Days", a song released by Prozak featuring Tech N9ne and Krizz Kaliko from Prozak's album Paranormal
- "One of These Days", a song released by Saga from 20/20
- "One of These Days", a song released by Santana featuring Ozomatli from Santana's album Shaman
- "One of These Days", a song released by The Searchers from Sugar and Spice
- "One of These Days", a song released by See You Next Tuesday from Intervals
- "One of These Days", a song released by Shane Filan from You and Me
- "One of These Days", a song released by Smalltown Poets from Listen Closely
- "One of These Days", a song released by Spacehog from The Chinese Album
- "One of These Days", a song released by Steve Wickham from the album Geronimo
- "One of These Days", a song released by Teddy Thompson from A Piece of What You Need
- "One of These Days", a song released by Ten Years After from A Space in Time
- "One of These Days", a song released by Tim Christensen from Superior
- "One of These Days", a song released by Tracy Bonham from Wax & Gold
- "One of These Days", a song released by The Velvet Underground from VU
- "One of These Days", a song released by Whitesnake from Forevermore
- "One of These Days", a song released by Within Temptation from the single "And We Run"
- "One of These Days", a song released by Wu-Tang Clan from Iron Flag

== Other uses ==
- "One of These Days", a short story by Gabriel García Márquez
- One of These Days, a 2003 album by Helen Slater
- One of These Days, a 2020 film by Bastian Günther

== See also ==
- These Days (disambiguation)
- One of Those Days (disambiguation)
