= Only the Young =

Only the Young may refer to:

- "Only the Young" (Journey song), 1985
- "Only the Young" (Brandon Flowers song), 2010
- "Only the Young" (Taylor Swift song), 2020
- Only the Young (band), English band that competed in The X Factor in 2014
