= Jilted Lovers & Broken Hearts =

Single by Brandon Flowers

from the album Flamingo
- Released: February 21, 2011 (UK)
- Recorded: 2010
- Studio: Battle Born (Winchester, Nevada)
- Genre: Alternative rock
- Length: 4:40
- Label: Island
- Songwriters: Flowers; Daniel Lanois; Stuart Price
- Producers: Flowers; Lanois; Price

Brandon Flowers singles chronology
"Only the Young" (2010)	"Jilted Lovers & Broken Hearts" (2011)	"Can't Deny My Love" (2015)

"Jilted Lovers & Broken Hearts" is a song by singer-songwriter Brandon Flowers, frontman of the Killers, from his debut studio album Flamingo (2010). Written and produced by Flowers, Daniel Lanois, known for his work on the Killers' 2012 studio album, Battle Born, and Stuart Price, known for his work on the Killers' Day & Age (2008), it was released in the UK as the third single from the album on February 21, 2011.

== Background and release ==
"Jilted Lovers & Broken Hearts" was written and produced by Brandon Flowers, Canadian record producer Daniel Lanois, known for co-writing the songs "The Way It Was", "Heart of a Girl", and "Be Still" from the Killers' fourth studio album Battle Born (2012), and British DJ Stuart Price, known for producing the Killers' third studio album Day & Age (2008), as well as his remix of 'Mr. Brightside' that appeared on the compilation album, Sawdust (2007).

The song was released as a single in the UK on February 21, 2011. Of the common gambling metaphors in the song, Flowers said in an interview with NPR that "[it] definitely just kept oozing its way in. It's kind of everywhere you go. It's billboards of Frank Sinatra and Elvis Presley. You drive by the Hilton every day and all the history that's there, it's just such a big part of the town." "Jilted Lovers & Broken Hearts" did not have a cover art or music video released.

== Reception ==
"Jilted Lovers & Broken Hearts" was met with mixed reviews. Drowned in Sound webzine remarked that the song was "a hard to resist denim-clad fist raiser, with lyrics suggesting some sort of lunar equivalent of ‘Mr. Brightside’," while Consequence of Sound commented that the "chorus is pretty solid but brought down by Flowers’ severity. The music itself has a throwaway, pop quality but it’s a nice change of pace [from 'Hard Enough']". All-Noise magazine remarked that the song is "perhaps the most Killers-y song [on Flamingo] – the slow, expectant intro builds into a pacey verse that opens up into a barn-storming chorus that would make Springsteen proud", while Beats Per Minute called the song "huge and catchy but it also becomes tiring after a few too many listens".

== Live performances ==
"Jilted Lovers & Broken Hearts" is one of Flowers' most popular songs, being played live over 100 times as of October 2025. The song was played frequently during the Flamingo Road Tour throughout 2010 and 2011, and rarely during the Desired Effect Tour in 2015 and 2016. The song was commonly played after a cover of "Bette Davis Eyes" by Jackie DeShannon.

== Personnel ==
Credits adapted from the liner notes of the deluxe edition of Flamingo.

=== Musicians ===
- Brandon Flowers – vocals, synth
- Stuart Price – synth, bass
- Benji Lysaght – guitar
- Daniel Lanois – guitar
- Darren Beckett – drums, percussion
- Herschel Gaer – acoustic guitar

=== Technical ===
- Stuart Price – production, mixing
- Daniel Lanois – production
- Brandon Flowers – production
- Robert Root – recording
- Josh Baker – recording assistance
- Tim Young – mastering
