= Private Stock =

Private Stock may refer to:

- Private Stock Records, a record label which was started in 1974 by Larry Uttal
- Private Stock (album), a 1995 album by The Grapes
- Private Stock (malt liquor)
- Private Stock Clothing Line, company founded by Jonathan Koon
