= Running with Knives =

Running With Knives

Studio album by David Hopkins
- Released: 2007
- Genre: Rock, pop, acoustic
- Length: 44:51
- Producer: David Hopkins

David Hopkins chronology
Amber and Green (2005)	Running With Knives (2007)	There Are Debts (2010)

Running With Knives is an album by David Hopkins, released in 2007. It was self-produced. All songs were written by David Hopkins. Strings were arranged by David Hopkins.

To promote the album David Hopkins (supported by Zamo Riffman & Marcus McDonald) performed "Meet me in the Morning" on RTÉ Radio 1's The John Creedon Show.

== Film and television ==
- "One of These Days", "Meet Me in the Morning" and "Look Out" were featured in the 2008 film The Hottie and the Nottie, alongside two other Hopkins tracks.

== Track listing ==
1. "Things Change" – 4:42
2. "One of These Days" – 3:56
3. "When I Die" – 3:48
4. "Back Down To Vegas" – 3:47
5. "Meet Me in the Morning" – 4:37
6. "Glimpses" – 4:41
7. "Circle" – 4:16
8. "Social Skills" – 3:23
9. "Running With Knives" – 4:06
10. "Three Times Zero" – 4:00
11. "Look Out" – 3:35
