= Dark Arts (album) =

Studio album by Mark Stoermer
- Released: August 5, 2016
- Recorded: July–October 2015
- Studio: Battle Born Studios and Studio at the Palms, Las Vegas, Nevada
- Length: 47:15
- Label: St. August
- Producer: David Hopkins, Mark Stoermer, Robert Root

Mark Stoermer chronology
Another Life (2011)	Dark Arts (2016)	Filthy Apes and Lions (2017)

Dark Arts is the second studio album by Killers bassist Mark Stoermer. It was released through his label, St. August Records, on August 5, 2016. “Spare the Ones that Weep” was the first single released on July 22, 2016, followed a week later by “Are Your Stars Out?”

== Background, development and recording ==
Stoermer wrote "Pretend Song" with the help of his friend Merkley by playing Ping-Song. Inspired by this process, Stoermer went on to write the rest of the album on his own, and sometimes with the help of longtime friend and co-producer, David Hopkins. By the end of 2015 writing for the record was finished. The album was recorded from July 2015 to October of the same year at Battle Born Studios and Studio at the Palms in Las Vegas. Mixing and mastering was completed in March 2016 by Robert Root.

Regarding the development of the album, Stoermer said: “In the studio, we would joke about Zeppelin’s Kashmir and No Quarter being examples of Jimmy Page summoning the Dark Arts... That said, Friedrich Nietzsche wrote, ‘Be careful when you cast out your demons that you don’t throw away the best of yourself.’ On that level, Dark Arts means embracing all of yourself, which I wanted to do. I didn’t shy away from anything, and it’s an honest representation of me as an artist.”

== Themes and influences ==
Dark Arts’ thirteen songs are a mosaic of sixties-induced psychedelia, bluesy desert rock and plaintive lyrical poetry, with cinematic orchestration. The inspiration for the album came from Stoermer growing up listening to bands like The Beatles, Pink Floyd, and The Who. It was important to Stoermer that the recording process permit him to explore and be adventurous. David Hopkins managed to bring out Stoermer's older influences in rock and helped him sort through and finish his ideas.

=== Music and lyrics ===
Unlike most musicians, Stoermer, for the most part, likes to finish the lyrics to his music before finishing the musical idea. His lyrical inspiration includes the works of mythology scholar Joseph Campbell and psychologist Carl Jung. All lyrics on the album were written by Stoermer with the exception of “Pretend Song” which he co-wrote with Merkley.

== Release ==
Dark Arts was released digitally and on CD on August 5, 2016 through Mark Stoermer’s label St. August Records. The album was released on vinyl on August 12, 2016 through Bong Load Records.

== Track listing ==
No.	Title	Length
1.	"Alchemical Formula"	1:55
2.	"Drifting Caterpillar"	3:31
3.	"Spare the Ones That Weep"	4:33
4.	"39 Steps"	5:13
5.	"Avarice/What's Coming"	4:41
6.	"The Break In"	4:02
7.	"Take My Time"	2:59
8.	"Blood and Guts"	3:53
9.	"Tow the Line"	3:03
10.	"Are Your Stars Out?"	4:36
11.	"Fingerspitzengefühl"	1:06
12.	"What Was In Between"	4:37
13.	"Pretend Song"	3:06

"Fingerspitzengefühl" and "What Was In Between" were dedicated to the memory of Dietrich A. Stoermer (1936 - 2015). "Are Your Stars Out?" was inspired by and dedicated to J.D. Salinger.

== Personnel ==
- Mark Stoermer – vocals, guitar, bass, tanpura, percussion
- David Hopkins – piano, Hammond organ, Moog synthesizers, Fender Rhodes, vocals, additional guitar ("39 Steps")
- Rob Whited – drums, percussion
- John Wackerman – drums ("Blood and Guts")
- Tony Curtis – narrator
- John Arnold – violin
- Jenny Massey – viola
- DeAnn Letourneau – viola
- Moonlight Tran – cello
- Elena Kapustina – cello
- Nate Kimball – trombone
- Eddie Rich – saxophone
- Mike Robb – trumpet

=== Production ===
- David Hopkins – production, horn and string arrangements
- Mark Stoermer – production
- Robert Root – additional production, recording, mixing, mastering
- Damian Taylor – mixing ("Are Your Stars Out?")
- Mark Everton Gray – recording
- Kevin Luu – additional recording
- Wyatt Boswell – technical assistance
- Rhett Boswell – birds sound sample

=== Design ===
- Mark Stoermer – cover photo, design
- Wyatt Boswell – studio photographs
- Corlene Byrd – design
