= The Grapes (band) =

US southern rock jam band (1986–1997)

- Origin: Atlanta, Georgia, US
- Genres: Rock, jam
- Years active: 1986–1997
- Labels: Earwise Records, Intersound Records
- Members: Charlie Lonsdorf; Preston Holcomb; Romin Dawson; Ted Norton; Steve Baird; Rick Welsh; Steven Fink; Brooks Smith
- Past members: Johnny Tessavarie; Katie Moore; Danny Simmons; Glen Holt

The Grapes were an American jam band and southern rock band band from Atlanta, who performed from 1986 to 1997.

== 1980s ==
Bassist/vocalist Charlie Lonsdorf formed the band with drummer Preston Holcomb in 1986. Most of their catalogue at the time were Grateful Dead and R&B covers. Early guitarists included Danny Simmons, Johnny Tessavarie and Katie Moore of Deep Blue Sun.

After the original guitarist left the band guitarist/songwriter Romin Dawson and lead guitarist Mike 'Ted' Norton joined the band. An important moment came for the band when Lonsdorf introduced his song Water To Wine, the bands first original song. Around this time they added second drummer/percussionist Steve Baird. Faced with rising popularity but still being under legal age to play in clubs, they found theaters and warehouses to rent, designed and distributed flyers. They put on shows at venues such as The Trinity Gallery and the East Point Theater and many house parties in Atlanta. Another favorite venue was the Arts Exchange where they shared the stage with Tom Hobson and hosted a Seva benefit with Wavy Gravy as MC.

They began to trade opening slots with Widespread Panic at each band's local home venue. At the time Widespread Panic had a large audience in Athens at the Uptown Lounge; the Grapes had a large audience in Atlanta at The Metroplex. The two bands also teamed up to play a show at the legendary Royal Peacock on Auburn Avenue in Atlanta. In 1988 The Grapes also shared the stage with Abbie Hoffman at the Alternative Democratic Convention on an outdoor stage at the Metroplex and did an indoor show with Iron Butterfly. The band began branching out in the late '80's playing dates around the Southeast with help in management from both Bob Fortin and Kevin Meaders the band would soon be touring well beyond the Atlanta area and toured extensively across the United States.

== 1990s ==
At the end of 1990, the band added Steven Fink on keyboards and vocals, and immediately went into the studio with John Keane (Indigo Girls, Widespread Panic, R.E.M.) to begin work on their debut album Water To Wine, on their own Earwise label. At this point, percussionist Rick Welsh took over the second drummer duties and Dawson and Fink began collaborating on songwriting.

With the success of their second album in 1992, High Or Low, as well as their inclusion on the Aware compilation album, the band toured constantly, averaging 250 dates a year, sharing the stage with a wide variety acts such as Merl Saunders, Michele Malone, Cypress Hill, Leftover Salmon, The Funky Meters and Phish.

The Grapes were the only band to play all seven of the Great Atlanta Pot Festivals, including the 1992 show at Piedmont Park with The Black Crowes. With 60,000 attending, that show stands as the largest marijuana legalization rally to date. In 1993 the band signed with Intersound Records, releasing their third album, Private Stock. Tensions and personal matters saw the exit of Dawson and Holcomb around this time. Throughout 1995, the band toured as a four-piece, before adding Brooks Smith on guitar and additional keyboards.

They released their final album, Juice, in 1997, and officially left the road in May of that year. In addition to personal matters, the breakup was attributed by Lonsdorf to "the band running out of steam."

== Modern day ==
The Grapes have since played many reunion shows in Atlanta, averaging one every two years, with all eight former members.

Holcomb is now percussionist for Blackberry Smoke. Dawson and Fink are working on a songwriting/recording project called Ten Ton Flood.

== Discography ==
- Water To Wine (1991) Earwise Records
- High or Low (1992) Earwise Records
- Private Stock (1994) Intersound
- Juice (1997) Deep South Records

== Compilations ==
- Aware Vol. 1 (1992) Madaket Records
- Homegrown (1995) Orange Records
