= Another Life (Mark Stoermer album) =

Studio album by Mark Stoermer
- Released: November 1, 2011 (free download); January 24, 2012 (CD, vinyl and iTunes)
- Recorded: 2010–2011
- Studio: Battle Born (Las Vegas); Home Studios (Las Vegas & San Francisco)
- Genre: Alternative rock, alternative country, psychedelic rock, synthpop
- Length: 28:55
- Label: St. August
- Producer: Mark Stoermer, Joel Stein, Glenn Moule, Jason Hill

Mark Stoermer chronology
Another Life (2011)	Dark Arts (2016)

Another Life is the debut studio album by American singer-songwriter and The Killers bassist Mark Stoermer, which was released on November 1, 2011, as a free download via markstoermer.com, and on CD and vinyl on January 24, 2012. It was also released on iTunes the same day along with two bonus tracks. The album was self-released on St. August Records.

Stoermer recorded the album in early 2011 with the help of Glenn Moule and Joel Stein from Howling Bells and Jason Hill from Louis XIV. The album was mixed by Robert Root and mastered by Bob Ludwig.

== Writing and recording ==
Originally Stoermer had no intentions of releasing the collection of songs to the public. The album was written and recorded over the span of two years, beginning with writing in hotel rooms and recording demos on a laptop. "As I was writing, I wasn't really sure where it was going. At first, I didn't even know I was making a record. I was just making demos and playing with ideas. . I worked on the songs off and on for about a year and a half. Some of the songs started to develop at the end of 2009, but some weren't written until the beginning of last year. At the end of the last Killers tour, I was writing in hotel rooms with a laptop and GarageBand. I'd hum little melodies and lyrical ideas into a Dictaphone. I spent a good deal of our break figuring out how to write and record these songs."

== Track listing ==
All tracks written and composed by Mark Stoermer. All tracks produced by Stoermer, Joel Stein, and Glenn Moule unless otherwise noted.

No.	Title	Producer(s)	Length
1.	"Weary Soul"	Mark Stoermer, Jason Hill	3:37
2.	"Shadow in a Dream"		2:49
3.	"Everyone Loves the Girl"		2:29
4.	"Need a Hand"		2:30
5.	"Amber Bough"	Stoermer, Hill	2:21
6.	"The Way We Were Before"		2:31
7.	"The Haunts"		3:25
8.	"No Time"		2:34
9.	"There Is No Is"		3:18
10.	"Another Life"		2:59

=== Digital bonus tracks ===
No.	Title	Length
11.	"Agni"	2:33
12.	"King of the Mountain"	2:27

== Personnel ==
=== Studios ===
- Battle Born Studios (Las Vegas) – recording
- Home Studios (Las Vegas & San Francisco) – recording

=== Musicians ===
- Mark Stoemer – vocals, acoustic guitar (all tracks); bass (tracks 1, 3–5, 7, 8, 10); keyboard (tracks 1, 3, 6–9); percussion (tracks 1, 2, 9); harmonica (track 1); electric guitar (tracks 4, 7); Wurlitzer piano (track 4); piano (track 9); electronic drum programming (tracks 6, 9)
- Jason Hill – electric guitar, piano, percussion (track 1); synthesizer (track 1, 5)
- Glenn Moule – vocals (track 6); drums (track 1, 3, 4, 6–8, 10); percussion (track 1, 3, 4, 6–10); tambourine (track 2)
- Joel Stein – vocals (track 8); acoustic guitar (tracks 3, 8); lap steel guitar (tracks 3, 6, 7, 10); piano (tracks 6–8, 10); electric guitar (track 10)
- Alex Carapetis – drums (track 5)

=== Technical ===
- Mark Stoermer – production, additional engineering (all tracks)
- Jason Hill – production (track 1, 5); additional engineering
- Joel Stein – production (tracks 2–4, 6–10), additional engineering
- Glenn Moule – production (tracks 2–4, 6–10)
- Robert Root – engineering, mixing
- Bob Ludwig – mastering

=== Artwork ===
- Heather Hyte – photography
- Wyatt Boswell – photography

== Release history ==
Region	Date	Format	Label
Worldwide	November 1, 2011	Digital download	St. August
Worldwide	January 24, 2012	CD, vinyl, iTunes	St. August
