= Laura Jansen =

Dutch-American musician (born 1977)

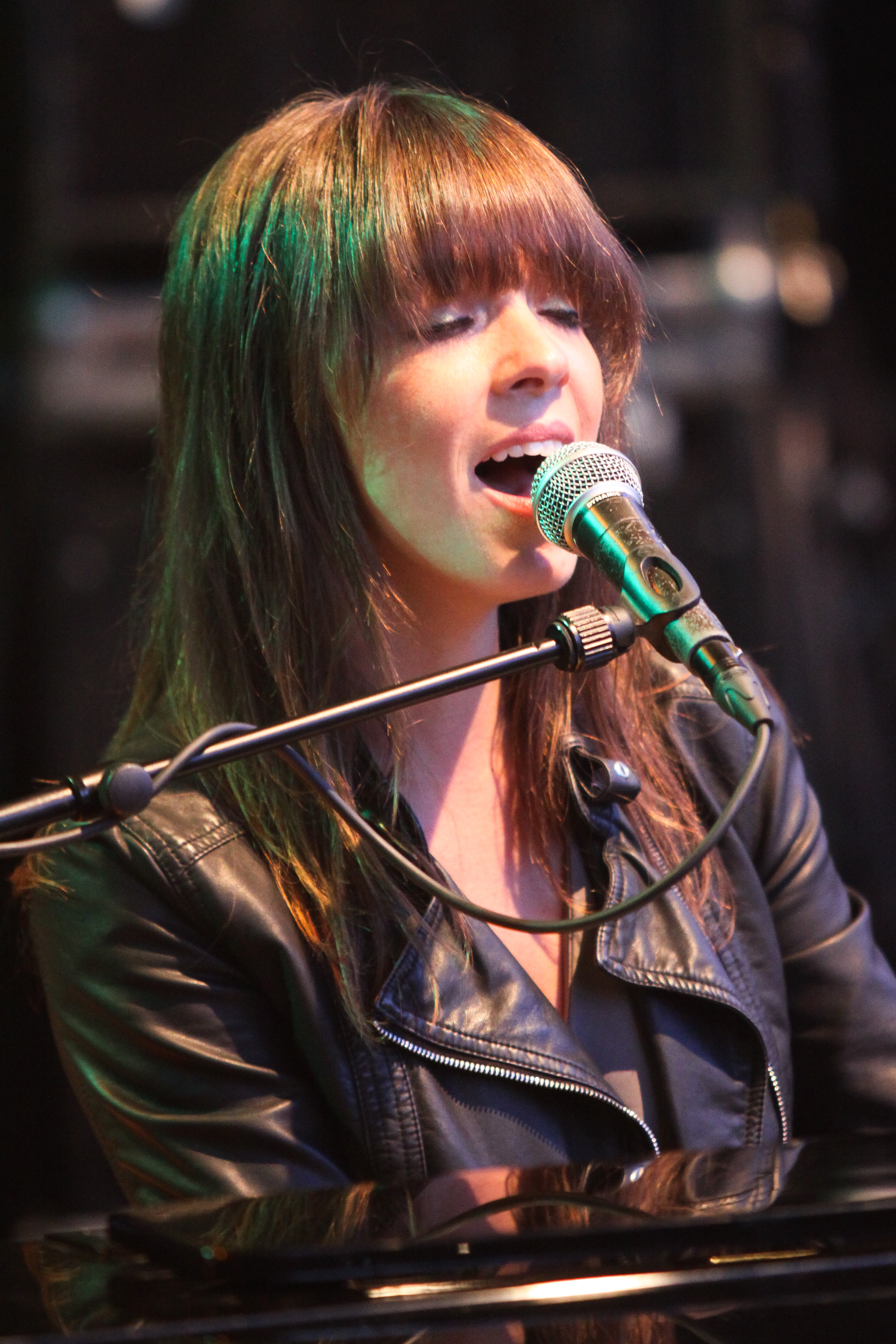
- Jansen in 2010

Background information
- Born: 4 March 1977 (age 49); Breda, North Brabant, Netherlands
- Origin: Netherlands
- Genres: Pop, Indie pop
- Occupation: Musician
- Instruments: Vocals, piano
- Years active: 2007–present
- Labels: Universal Music Group (Global), Decca (United States)
- Website: laurajansen.com

Laura Jansen (born 4 March 1977) is a Dutch-American musician. Before gaining fame in the Netherlands, Jansen became a fixture in the constellation of artists associated with Los Angeles nightclub Hotel Café – a national launching pad for artists as Sara Bareilles, Priscilla Ahn and Joshua Radin. As a daughter of an American mother and Dutch father, Laura has been living in the United States for over 10 years.

== Early life ==
Born in Breda, to a Dutch father and an American mother, Jansen began playing piano at age five while the family lived in Brussels, followed by Zurich and Connecticut. Jansen fell in love with classical music, Queen, Joni Mitchell, Barbra Streisand, and the Brazilian protest music her mother loved. In high school, she sang in the choir and performed in musicals.

Passionate about politics, Jansen studied political science in college but backed away after a good friend, a human-rights activist, was killed in Nigeria.

Jansen spent two years at a music conservatory in the Netherlands, before transferring to Boston's renowned Berklee College of Music with a scholarship. After graduating, she moved to Nashville to become a songwriter.

== Hotel Café ==
Jansen packed up to Los Angeles in 2003. Jansen's first call was to Hotel Café, where she became a part of this community – home to Sara Bareilles, John Mayer, Katy Perry and many more singer/songwriters.

On 26 February 2007 she released her Trauma EP, from which she licensed songs to MTV's The Real World and Newport Harbor, and she had a song covered on Canadian Idol.

In summer 2008, Laura performed as both a member of Joshua Radin's band and as an opener on his sold-out headlining tour. She made her first TV appearance with Radin on Last Call with Carson Daly and performed alongside Radin as the only two musical performers at Ellen DeGeneres' wedding.

Soon after, Laura was offered a slot on the Hotel Café All Girls' Tour in the Fall alongside Ingrid Michaelson, Rachael Yamagata, and Erin McCarley. Upon returning from the SXSW Music Festival, Laura finished her second EP Single Girls, released on 26 June 2009, a collection of five alternative, intimate pop songs. It debuted at No. 25 on the U.S. iTunes Pop Charts.

== Europe ==
Upon her return, Laura was invited to the Netherlands for a series of performances, most importantly at the television show De Wereld Draait Door. In a week she was signed to Universal Music Netherlands where her full-length record entitled Bells (a compilation of Jansen's two previously released EPs: 2007's Trauma and 2009's Single Girls, plus Use Somebody) was released on 6 September 2009.

in 2011, Laura completed two sold-out national club tours and received a certified gold record

Jansen toured Europe in the fall of 2009 with William Fitzsimmons, both as a member of his band and as his support act. She continued to play in Germany, Austria, the UK and the Czech Republic as fans spread the word.

Laura also appeared as a special guest vocalist on stage in Amsterdam with Snow Patrol as well as Novastar. In 2010 she was a featured artist at Germany's showcase festivals Popkomm and Reeperbahn Festival, as well as the SXSW Music Festival 2010.

In 2011 Laura continued to tour, visiting the Netherlands, Germany, Austria and Switzerland again. Jansen also toured with Belgium singer-songwriter Milow as his support act and a member of his band in August 2011 in Germany.

== United States ==
After returning from touring in Europe in the beginning of 2011, Jansen hit the road again with Joshua Radin in February 2011 as both a member of his band and as an opener on his headlining tour through the US and Canada.

Following her album release of debut album Bells in the US on 22 March 2011, Jansen went on the road with her own headline tour. This featured shows in New York, Chicago, Los Angeles, and several performances on the SXSW Music Festival 2011, most importantly with a showcase at the Hotel Café Showcase.

In October 2011 Laura Jansen also performed on The Late Late Show with Craig Ferguson with her song "Wicked World".

== China ==
In November 2011 Jansen made her way to China, invited by Shanghai and Beijing-based promoters Split Works.

When she started a Douban group (Chinese Facebook) in the beginning of 2011, Jansen immediately shot to number No. 1 artist and stayed there for several weeks. In November 2011, she toured China, including sold out shows in Nanjing and Shanghai. In that same month, Laura's debut album, Bells, was officially released in China.

In May 2012 Jansen was invited back to China to perform at the Chinese Strawberry Music Festival in Beijing and Shanghai.

== Live band ==
In the early 2010s, Jansen's live band consisted of the Dutch musicians Jan-Peter Hoekstra (guitars, vocals), Wouter Rentema (drums, percussion, vocals), and Jan Teertstra (bass, vocals).

== Discography ==
=== Albums and EPs ===
In the US, Laura Jansen has two self-released EPs. Trauma, (released 26 February 2007) and Single Girls (released 26 June 2009).

Jansen's debut album, Bells, was released on Universal Music in the Netherlands in 2009, on Decca Records in the US in March 2011, and in the rest of the world in May 2011 on Universal Music Group.

Bells (composed of Jansen's two previously released EPs 2007's Trauma and 2009's Single Girls, plus cover Use Somebody), sold over 50,000 copies in the Netherlands and reached platinum status in 2011. It reached a No. 1 position on iTunes and a No. 6 position in the Dutch Album Top 100.

Laura Jansen released her album Elba in 2013. It featured the singles "Same Heart" and "Queen of Elba". The latter gained critical acclaim and was described as "sublime".

=== Singles ===
Jansen has released three songs from her album Bells as singles. "Single Girls" peaked at number 70 on the Dutch Single Top 100. The second single was "Use Somebody", originally by Kings of Leon. The song peaked at number 8 on the Dutch Single Top 100 and spent more than 6 months lodged in the Top 25 on the Dutch singles chart. The third single from this album, "Wicked World", which was also the theme song for the Dutch comedy series "Floor Faber", peaked at number 31 on the Dutch Single Top 100.

Jansen's second single "Use Somebody", was remixed by Armin van Buuren and is played frequently in his shows.

In December 2012 the charity single "Same Heart", featuring Tom Chaplin, was released. All proceeds generated from sales of "Same Heart" will be fully granted to the 3FM Serious Request campaign 2012.

=== Other ===
Jansen's music has been featured on various television shows on MTV and ABC like Newport Harbor, The Real World: Cancun, Canadian Idol, MTV Awkward and on a spot for Weeds.

Laura Jansen appears in the music video for Sara Bareilles' song "Uncharted".

Laura Jansen duets with David Hopkins on the song "Dublin".

=== Chart positions ===
Taken from dutchcharts.nl.

==== Albums ====
Album title	Release date	Charting in the Dutch Album Top 100			Comments
Album title	Release date	Date of entry	Highest	Weeks	Comments
Trauma	26 February 2007	-			EP
Single Girls	26 June 2009	-			EP
Bells	4 September 2009	12 September 2009	6	95	Platinum
Elba	22 March 2013	30 March 2013	5	24	
We Saw a Light	7 May 2021	15 May 2021	45		

==== Singles ====
Single title	Release date	Charting in the Dutch Top 40			Comments
Single title	Release date	Date of entry	Highest	Weeks	Comments
"Single Girls"	26 June 2009	12 September 2009	70	9	Single Top 100
"Use Somebody"	16 October 2009	28 November 2009	8	62	Single Top 100
"Wicked World"	12 March 2010	10 April 2010	31	14	Single Top 100
"Same Heart" (feat. Tom Chaplin)	4 December 2012	8 December 2012	6	6	Single Top 100
