= These Days =

These Days may refer to:

== Music ==
=== Albums ===
- These Days (Bon Jovi album), and the title song (see below)
  - These Days Tour, a 1995–1996 tour by Bon Jovi in support of the above album
- These Days (Crystal Gayle album), 1980
- These Days (Family Brown album)
- These Days (Goodness album)
- These Days (The Grapes of Wrath album), 1991
- These Days (Vince Gill album), 2006, and the title song
- These Days (Paul Carrack album)
- These Days (The Virginia Sessions), 2007 album by Pat McGee Band
- These Days: Live in Concert, 2004 live album by Powderfinger, and the title song (see below)
- These Days... (album), 2014 album by Ab-Soul
- These Days, by Sandi Patty
- These Days, EP by Spencer P. Jones
- These Days, album by Mike Stud

=== Songs ===
- "These Days" (Bardot song)
- "These Days" (Bon Jovi song)
- "These Days" (Brian Kennedy song)
- "These Days" (Gyroscope song)
- "These Days" (Jackson Browne song), also covered by Nico
- "These Days" (MacKenzie Porter song)
- "These Days" (Powderfinger song)
- "These Days" (Rascal Flatts song)
- "These Days" (Rudimental song)
- "These Days" (Take That song)
- "These Days" (Alien Ant Farm song)
- "These Days" (Foo Fighters song)
- "These Days (I Barely Get By)", 1974 song by George Jones
- "These Days", by 3 Doors Down from 3 Doors Down
- "These Days", by ATB featuring Jeppe Riddervold from Trilogy
- "These Days", by Alison Krauss from Paper Airplane
- "These Days", by Andrew Cash from Boomtown
- "These Days", by Ane Brun from It All Starts with One
- "These Days", by Ayọ from Joyful
- "These Days", by Bad Astronaut from Houston: We Have a Drinking Problem
- "These Days", by The Black Keys from Brothers
- "These Days", by Camille O'Sullivan from Changeling
- "These Days", by Chantal Kreviazuk
- "These Days", by Cheap Trick from The Latest
- "These Days", by Cher from Stars
- "These Days", by CNBLUE from Code Name Blue
- "These Days", by The Crash from Pony Ride (The Crash album)
- "These Days", by Day After Tomorrow from Primary Colors
- "These Days", by Die Kreuzen from Century Days
- "These Days", by Diecast from Tearing Down Your Blue Skies
- "These Days", by Dogs from Tall Stories from Under the Table
- "These Days", by Dr. Dog from Be the Void
- "These Days", by Githead from Art Pop
- "These Days", by The Hours from See the Light
- "These Days", by Jeanne Balibar from Slalom Dame
- "These Days", by The Jesus and Mary Chain from Stoned & Dethroned
- "These Days", by Johnny Clegg & Savuka from Heat, Dust and Dreams
- "These Days", by Joy Division, B-Side of the single "Love Will Tear Us Apart"
- "These Days", by Lennon Murphy from 5:30 Saturday Morning
- "These Days", by Lloyd Cole and the Commotions from Mainstream
- "These Days", by Machine Gun Fellatio from On Ice
- "These Days", by Mandisa from What If We Were Real
- "These Days", by Maverick Sabre from Lonely Are the Brave
- "These Days", by Mis-Teeq from Lickin' on Both Sides
- "These Days", by Nate Dogg from G-Funk Classics, Vol. 1 & 2
- "These Days", by Precious from Precious
- "These Days", by Radio Moscow from Magical Dirt
- "These Days", by R.E.M. from Lifes Rich Pageant
- "These Days", by The Rentals from Return of the Rentals
- "These Days", by Revive from Trafalgar Street
- "These Days", by Richard Fleeshman from Neon
- "These Days", by Ron Sexsmith from Cobblestone Runway
- "These Days", by Roses Are Red from What Became of Me
- "These Days", by Sara Evans from No Place That Far
- "These Days", by Scooter from God Save the Rave
- "These Days", by Times New Viking from Born Again Revisited
- "These Days", by Wallows from Spring
- "These Days", by Z-Ro from Angel Dust
- "In Dino" by Pritam and Soham from the 2007 Indian film Life in a... Metro

== Other uses ==
- These Days, a poetry collection by Frederick Seidel
- These Days (film), 2016

== See also ==
- One of These Days (disambiguation)
- "Some of These Days", a 1910 song written by Shelton Brooks, covered by many artists
- "These Nights", by Rich Brian and Chungha
- Those Days (disambiguation)
