= There Are Debts =

Studio album by David Hopkins
- Released: December 2010
- Genre: Rock, pop, acoustic
- Length: 40:03
- Label: Reekus (IRL)
- Producer: Matt Fish

David Hopkins chronology
Fake Fur Coat (2009)	There Are Debts (2010)	Overlook (2018)

There Are Debts is an album by David Hopkins, released in December 2010. It was produced by Matt Fish. All songs were written by David Hopkins. Strings and horns were arranged by David Hopkins.

To promote the album, David Hopkins performed live on Today with Pat Kenny on 4 April 2011. He also performed live on PBS' Vegas in Tune.

== Critical reaction ==
Professional ratings
Review scores
Source	Rating
The Sunday Times	4/5 stars
Hot Press	4/5 stars
The Irish Times	3/5 stars
Las Vegas Weekly	4/5 stars
Las Vegas Citylife	(favorable)

The record was released to largely positive critical and fan reaction. Hot Press gave the record 4/5 stars, calling it "one helluva album" and stated regarding the title track that it is "a stunning track, superbly underpinned by sombre piano and brass". The Sunday Times also gave the record 4/5 stars and wrote that it is "sweet and tuneful" and commented that "his harmonious duet with Laura Jansen...is a triumph" and a "stunningly beautiful ballad". The Irish Times declared that the album had "several shining examples of nigh-on perfect songcraft here" though it only gave the album 3/5 stars. Las Vegas Weekly called Hopkins "an Ace singer-songwriter" and also gave the album 4/5 stars. RTÉ Radio 1 made it "Album of the Week". Las Vegas Citylife called it "unbelievably catchy - you'll be singing along by the second chorus of most tracks - and despite the sad parts, There Are Debts makes you feel all warm inside."

== Track listing ==
1. "I Want Your Love" – 3:44
2. "When I Was Young" – 4:22
3. "There Are Debts (featuring Damien Rice)" – 3:26
4. "Stay Here" – 3:50
5. "Angels in the Satellites" – 4:19
6. "God You're Letting Me Down" – 3:19
7. "Money" – 3:53
8. "In the Country" – 3:25
9. "Dublin (featuring Laura Jansen) " – 4:15
10. "Shape of Things" – 4:14
11. "Igloo" – 1:14

== Personnel ==
- David Hopkins– vocals, acoustic guitar, piano, Hammond, rhodes, synths, mellotron, bells
- Zamo Riffman - guitar, backing vocals
- Brett Simons (of Brian Wilson's band) – electric bass, acoustic bass
- Aaron Sterling - percussion, drums
- Damien Rice - guest vocals
- Laura Jansen - guest vocals, backing vocals
- Jack Hopkins - backing vocals
- Amy Kuney - backing vocals
- Beth Thornley - backing vocals
- Matt Fish - cello
- Jared-Matt Greenberg - trumpet
- Danny Levin - trumpet, euphonium, trombone
- David Moyer - tenor saxophone, baritone saxophone
- Brando Triantafillou - additional guitar, additional drums
- Daphne Chen, Marisa Kuney, Melissa Reiner, Jenny Takamatsu, Amy Wickman, and Alwyn Wright - violin
- Charlie Hebenstreit and Karolina Nemieniec - viola
