= Amber and Green =

Studio album by David Hopkins
- Released: 2005
- Genres: Rock, pop, acoustic
- Length: 47:00
- Label: Reekus Records (IRL)
- Producer: David Hopkins

David Hopkins chronology
Here Comes the Bright Light (2001)	Amber and Green (2005)	Running With Knives (2007)

Amber and Green is an album by David Hopkins, released in 2005. It was self produced. All songs were written by David Hopkins. Strings and synths were arranged by David Hopkins.

The title track reached the Irish Top 40 chart.

== Film and television ==
- "Amber & Green" was featured in the 2005 film National Lampoon's Van Wilder: The Rise of Taj starring Kal Penn.
- "You've Got to Suffer" and "Then There's None" were featured in the 2008 film The Hottie and the Nottie starring Paris Hilton and Joel Moore alongside three other Hopkins tracks.
- "Scared Rabbit", "Then There's None" and "British Boys" were featured in the 2006 film Speed Dating starring Hugh O'Conor.
- "One Dark Morning" and "Then There's None" were featured on MTV's Real World Austin in episode's no. 9 and 15 (2005).
- "Somebody's Gonna Lose Somebody" was performed live on PBS' Vegas In Tune.

== Critical reception ==
Professional ratings
Review scores
Source	Rating
Hot Press	4.5/5 stars
The Irish Times	4/5 stars
RTÉ Radio	3/5 stars
Entertainment.ie	4/5 stars

The record was released to largely positive critical and fan reaction. Hot Press gave the record 4.5/5 stars, calling it "Intimate, Intelligent, Intoxicating...". They also made the title track the "Single of the Issue". RTÉ Radio was more critical and only gave the album 3/5 stars, but said "Not even a soon-to-expire walkman can take away from some of the moments on Hopkins' full length debut". The Sunday Times said "In its jauntier moments the album recalls Big Star or even Abbey Road-era Beatles, as well as evoking more predictable influences such as Bob Dylan and Jeff Buckley". Both The Irish Times and Entertainment.ie gave it 4/5, with the latter lauding Hopkins by stating "we can see that behind the hype there was always a rock-solid talent" and the former calling it "both reassuringly familiar and consistently surprising". The Irish Times also called the title track single and b-sides "charming, folksy ditties that should appeal to Damien Rice and Nick Drake fans. He definitely shouldn't wait another 15 years for the next one" (3/5).

== Track listing ==
1. "You're Some Kind of Christian" – 3:47
2. "Amber & Green" – 4:21
3. "British Boys" – 4:12
4. "Then There's None" – 3:06
5. "You've Got to Suffer" – 3:14
6. "Somebody's Gonna Lose Somebody" – 4:15
7. "Scared Rabbit" – 3:00
8. "Jackson" – 3:43
9. "Ginger Hair" – 4:28
10. "One Dark Morning" – 3:50
11. "My Time is Running Out" – 5:03
12. "I Can't Speak Your Name" – 3:17
13. "The End" – 0:46
