= One of Those Days (disambiguation) =

"One of Those Days" is a 2002 song by Whitney Houston.

One of Those Days may also refer to:

== Music ==
- One of Those Days (EP), a 2009 EP by Joy Williams

=== Songs ===
- "One of Those Days", a song by Gabrielle Aplin from the 2020 album Dear Happy
- "One of Those Days", a song by Adrian Below from the 1999 album Salad Days
- "One of Those Days", a song by Earl Thomas Conley from the 1992 album Yours Truly
- "One of Those Days", a song by Duran Duran from the 2004 album Astronaut
- "One of Those Days", a song by Little Big Town song from the 2016 album Wanderlust
- "One of Those Days", a song by John Martun from the 1970 album Stormbringer!
- "One of Those Days", a song by Dolly Parton from the 1983 album Burlap & Satin
- "One of Those Days", a song by Joshua Radin from the 2008 album Simple Times
- "One of Those Days", a song by "Weird Al" Yankovic from the 1986 album Polka Party!

== Other ==
- One of Those Days, a 2005 children's book by Amy Krouse Rosenthal
- One of Those Days, a 1988 animated short movie by Bill Plympton

== See also ==
- Those Days (disambiguation)
- One of These Days (disambiguation)
