= Those Days =

Those Days may refer to:

- Those Days (novel)
- "Those Days", a song by Shaggy from his 2007 album Intoxication
- "Those Days", a song by Nickelback from their 2022 album Get Rollin'

== See also ==
- In Those Days, a 1947 German film
- One of Those Days (disambiguation)
- These Days (disambiguation)
- Yeh Un Dinon Ki Baat Hai (lit. 'This is About Those Days'), an Indian television series
