= Only the Young (Brandon Flowers song) =

Single by Brandon Flowers

from the album Flamingo
- Released: October 12, 2010
- Recorded: Early 2010
- Genre: Synth-pop; new wave; pop rock
- Length: 4:19
- Label: Island
- Songwriter: Brandon Flowers
- Producer: Stuart Price

Brandon Flowers singles chronology
"Crossfire" (2010)	"Only the Young" (2010)	"Jilted Lovers & Broken Hearts" (2011)

Music video
- "Only the Young" on YouTube

"Only the Young" is the second solo single by American singer-songwriter and the Killers frontman Brandon Flowers, from his debut studio album Flamingo. The song was written by Flowers and produced by Stuart Price.

== Critical reception ==
Entertainment Weekly encouraged readers to download the tune, calling it a "bittersweet lament".

== Music video ==
The video was filmed in Flowers' hometown of Las Vegas, Nevada in the Aqua Theater at the Wynn Las Vegas, featuring performers from Le Rêve. It was directed by Sophie Muller, who previously directed a video for The Killers' song, "Mr. Brightside". It has more than 25 million views as of July 2025.

== Track listing ==
Promo CD single

1. "Only the Young" (radio edit) – 4:02
2. "Only the Young" (album version) – 4:19
3. "Only the Young" (DJ Lynnwood radio edit) – 3:31
4. "Only the Young" (DJ Lynnwood extended remix) – 7:20
5. "Only the Young" (DJ Lynnwood remix – no bridge) – 6:43
6. "Only the Young" (DJ Lynnwood dubstrumental) – 6:38

Other remixes

- "Only the Young" (Roger Sanchez Release Yourself remix)
- "Only the Young" (Jesse Marco & Cool Cat remix)
- "Only the Young" (Michael Woods remix)

== Personnel ==
Credits taken from the liner notes of Flamingo.

- Brandon Flowers – vocals, synth
- Stuart Price – slide guitar, guitar, programming, bass, synth; production, mixing

== Charts ==
Chart (2010)	Peak position
Belgium (Ultratip Bubbling Under Flanders)	40
Belgium (Ultratip Bubbling Under Wallonia)	29
Netherlands (Dutch Top 40 Tipparade)	8
Netherlands (Single Top 100)	68
Poland (Polish Airplay New)	2
Switzerland Airplay (Schweizer Hitparade)	80
US Adult Pop Airplay (Billboard)	39
