= Mark Stoermer =

American musician (born 1977)

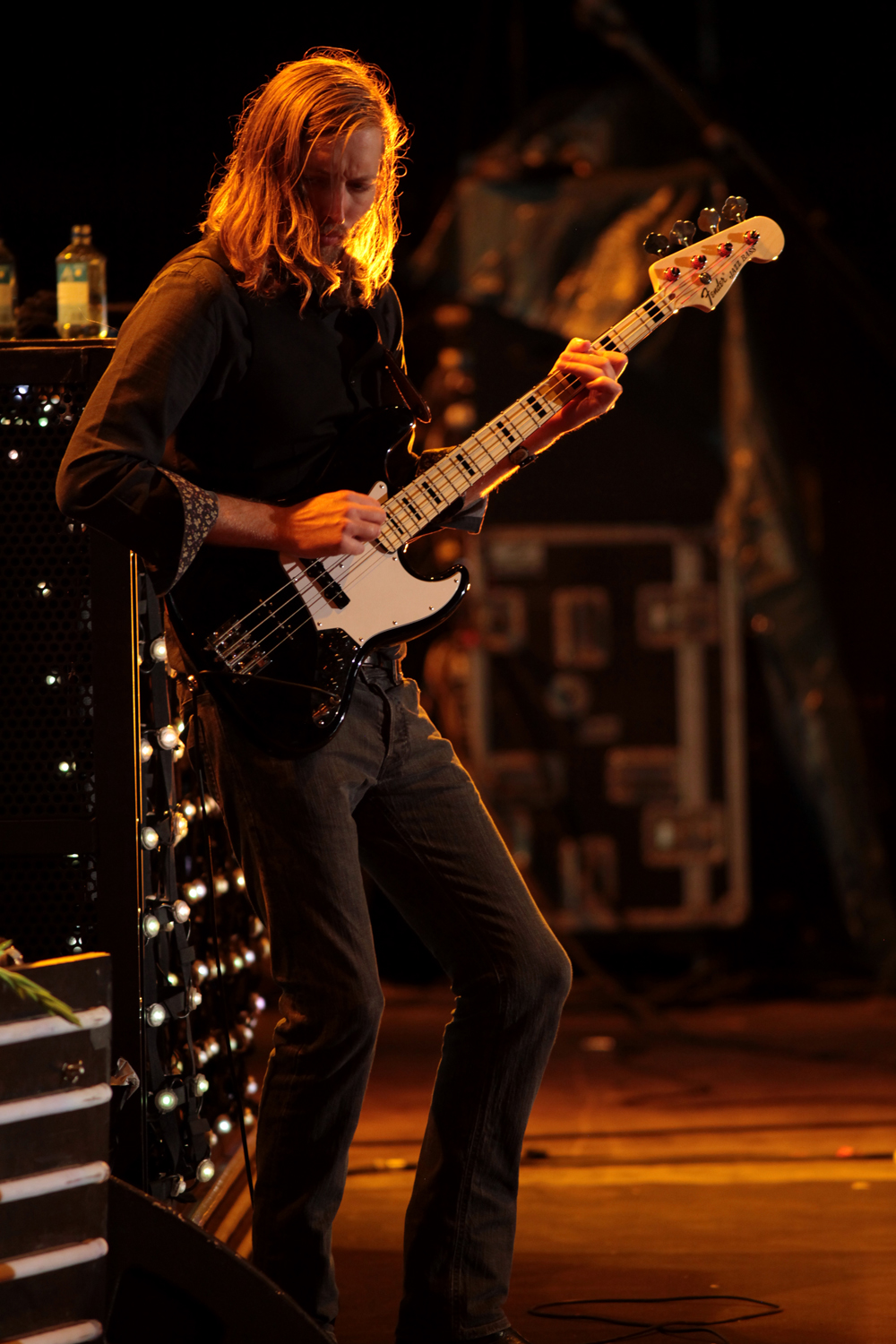
- Stoermer performing with the Killers in 2011

Background information
- Born: Mark August Stoermer; June 28, 1977 (age 49); Houston, Texas, U.S
- Origin: Las Vegas, Nevada, U.S.
- Genres: Alternative rock; post-punk revival; new wave; heartland rock; pop rock; psychedelic rock
- Occupations: Musician; songwriter
- Instruments: Bass guitar; guitar
- Years active: 2002–present
- Labels: Island; St. August
- Member of: The Killers
- Website: markstoermer.com

Mark August Stoermer (born June 28, 1977) is an American musician. He is best known as the bassist for the rock band the Killers, with whom he has recorded six studio albums.

In addition to his work with the Killers, Stoermer has released three solo albums, Another Life in 2011, Dark Arts in 2016, and Filthy Apes and Lions in 2017. Stoermer also joined the Smashing Pumpkins to tour in support of the band's ninth studio album, Monuments to an Elegy (2014), and produced Howling Bells' third studio album The Loudest Engine (2011).

== Early life ==
Mark August Stoermer was born in Houston, Texas, to a German-Australian father who was a physician and a big-band-style musician and an American mother who was a nurse. They moved to Las Vegas when Stoermer was three years old.

Stoermer graduated in 1995 from Chaparral High School, where he played trumpet in the jazz ensemble. His early musical influences included hip hop bands such as Public Enemy and N.W.A and later rock bands such as Nirvana, the Beatles, the Who and Pink Floyd. Stoermer played lead guitar for a number of local bands including Habit Rouge and the Negative Ponies. Before the Killers got signed, Stoermer worked as a medical courier. Stoermer also studied philosophy and music at UNLV.

== Career ==
=== The Killers (2002–present) ===
While performing with the Negative Ponies, Stoermer met Brandon Flowers and Dave Keuning, who were performing as an early incarnation of the Killers. He was a fan of the band's unique sound and was often present at the band's gigs." They even asked me to join the band as a guitar player, because originally – at least according to Dave – they wanted to build a five-piece, possibly more like the Strokes with a keyboard," said Stoermer in 2016. "I was first asked to be a second guitar player and I casually mentioned I also play bass. And then one day I got the call from Dave." In September 2002, he was offered the opportunity to become the band's permanent bass player, which he accepted and completed the band's lineup along with Ronnie Vannucci Jr. The band's seven studio albums each reached No. 1 on the United Kingdom Albums Chart and garnered the band seven GRAMMY Award nominations and seven BRIT Award nominations.

=== Production work and collaborations (2010–present) ===
In 2010, Stoermer produced rock band Howling Bells' third studio album, The Loudest Engine. The album was recorded at Battle Born Studios in Las Vegas, Nevada, and was released in September 2011.

On September 24, 2014, Stoermer performed "Let It Down" and "Ballad of Sir Frankie Crisp (Let It Roll)" with Dhani Harrison on Conan during George Harrison week.

In late 2014 and early 2015, Stoermer played bass guitar on tour with the Smashing Pumpkins along with Billy Corgan, Jeff Schroeder and Brad Wilk. A Smashing Pumpkins fan since his teen years, Stoermer received a call from Corgan – who had become a casual acquaintance after their respective bands played a few shows together in recent years – to join the touring line-up in support of the Smashing Pumpkins' then-new album Monuments to an Elegy. The strength of the new material convinced Stoermer to accept the offer. "In addition to the nostalgia aspect, I also had to hear the new music, which I think is great. If the new music wasn't up to par, I wouldn't be doing it. I felt like, yeah, it was one of those things I had to do", he said.

On December 1, 2014, Stoermer performed "Maida Vale" with Smashing Pumpkins on BBC Radio 6. On December 11, 2014, he performed "Being Beige" with Smashing Pumpkins on Jimmy Kimmel Live. On April 3, 2015, he performed "Drum + Fife" with the Smashing Pumpkins on The Tonight Show Starring Jimmy Fallon.

=== Hiatus with the Killers (2016–present) ===
On May 24, 2016, the Killers announced that Stoermer was taking a break from touring "to pursue other educational goals and releasing a solo album." The statement emphasized that Stoermer was still involved in working on the band's fifth album, Wonderful Wonderful, and that he may still occasionally perform live with them in the future. Stoermer elaborated further in an interview: "I'm taking a class online right now. The reason why I'm doing that is to take a break, but not exclusively. It's a combination of a lot of things. I've been doing the Killers since 2003 and I think about a thousand shows. I just needed to step away a while from that." Stoermer performed with the band at their 2017 Glastonbury Festival appearance, as well as at the Vegas Strong benefit show that December. Stoermer also appeared with the band as a part of their appearance on Jimmy Kimmel Live! in April 2019.

Stoermer was not involved in the Killers' seventh studio album Pressure Machine, mainly due to complications from COVID-19. However, he did contribute to the song selection of their 2023 compilation album, Rebel Diamonds, and performed with the band during their 20 Years of Hot Fuss residency in 2024 and 2025. Stoermer also performed with the band on the single "Bright Lights," released prior to the residency in August 2024. Stoermer was present with The Killers, Waddy Watchel and David Letterman for The Rock and Roll Hall of Fame 2025 induction ceremony on behalf of Warren Zevon. Stoermer performed with the Killers Live at Freely Fest at Bridgestone Arena in Nashville, 8th April 2026.

=== Solo career ===
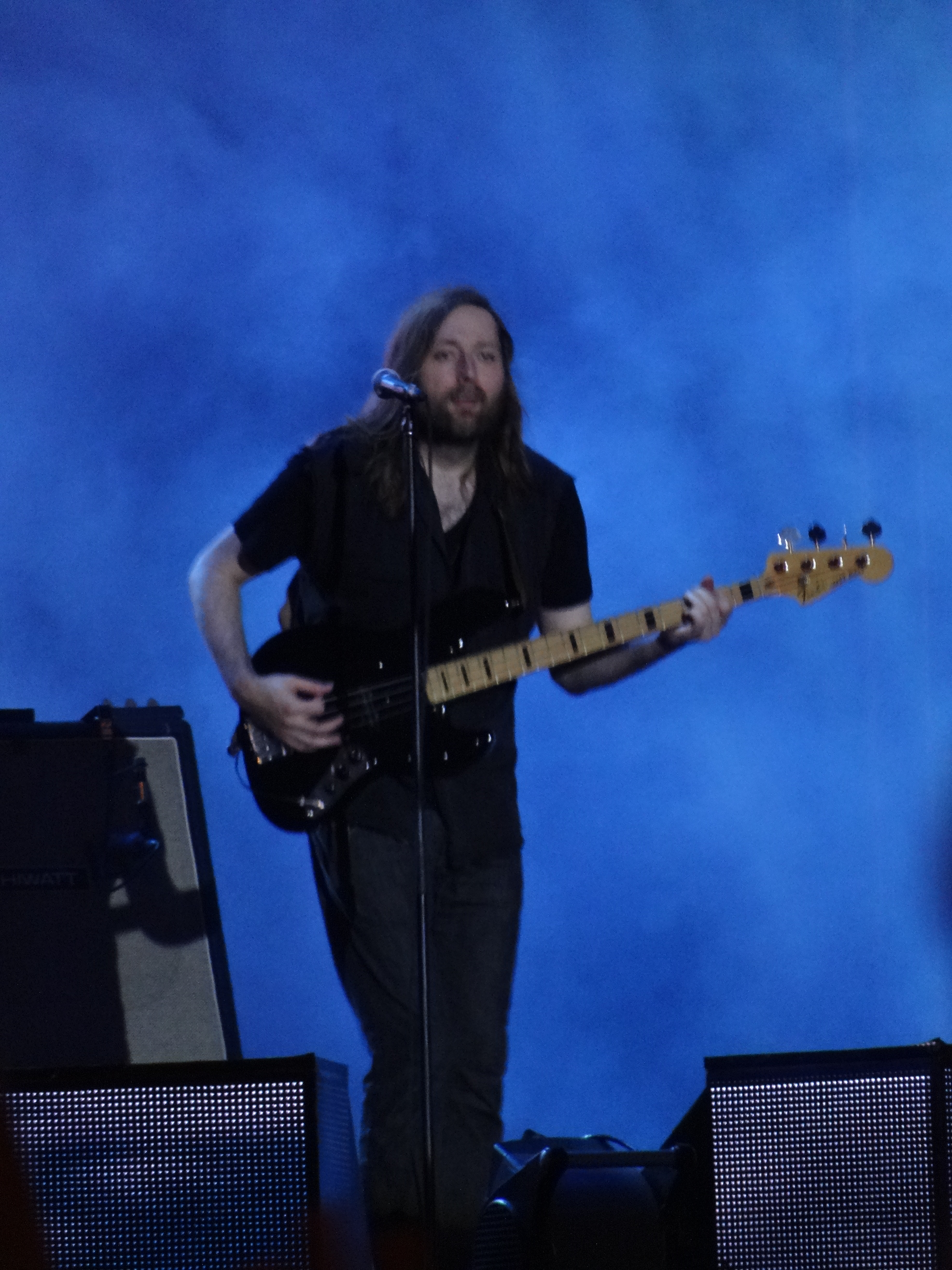
Stoermer performing in 2013

==== Another Life (2011) ====
Stoermer's debut studio album Another Life was released on November 1, 2011, as a self-release on St. August Records. It was available for free download via markstoermer.com, and sold on CD and vinyl on January 24, 2012. It was also released on iTunes the same day along with two bonus tracks. Stoermer recorded the album in early 2011 with the help of Glenn Moule and Joel Stein, from Howling Bells, and Jason Hill from Louis XIV. The album was mixed by Robert Root and mastered by Bob Ludwig.

==== Dark Arts (2016) ====
Dark Arts was released on August 5, 2016, as a self-release on St. August Records. The album was written and produced by Stoermer. David Hopkins was also involved in writing and production. The album was mixed and engineered by Robert Root.

The first single "Spare the Ones that Weep" was released on July 22, 2016. Soon after the second single "Are Your Stars Out?" was released on July 29, 2016, and was featured on Billboard along with an interview in which Stoermer talked about his inspiration for the song's lyrics. The album was sold digitally, on CD, and on vinyl.

Stoermer talked about his idea for writing "Dark Arts" with Interview Magazine: "I wanted to do at least one [record] that was an album experience, even though the days of the album experience may be over. If anything, it may be a tribute to those times... Maybe someone out there will have that experience with this album."

The album is noticeably different from the work he is known for with the Killers, consisting mainly of sixties psychedelic foundations.

==== Blood and Guts / Beautiful Deformities 7-inch (2016) ====
The Blood and Guts / Beautiful Deformities 7-inch was a limited edition vinyl released for Halloween 2016 with only 100 copies made that were decorated with one of ten unique designs and only ten of each design was produced. The release featured the single Blood and Guts (The Anatomy Lesson) on one side, and Beautiful Deformities (The Monastic Controversy) on the other. 100 additional copies were manufactured and given away to fans through the Secret Door, a hidden page on Mark's website, initiated as a "thank you" note. These copies didn't have the same picture disc artwork as the other 100 copies.

==== Shows ====
In support of Dark Arts, Stoermer invited several musicians to form the Hownds, a five-person band including David Hopkins (keyboards), Nigel Ledgerwood (rhythm guitar), Ben Lecourt (drums) and Erik Paparozzi (bass). They performed five shows in Las Vegas and Los Angeles.

==== Filthy Apes and Lions (2017) ====
Filthy Apes and Lions was released on vinyl on October 13, and digitally and on CD on November 17, 2017 through Stoermer's label St. August Records. The title track "Filthy Apes and Lions" was the first single released on October 13, 2017. "Beautiful Deformities" was the second single, released on November 11, 2017.

Filthy Apes and Lions was written and produced by Mark Stoermer and David Hopkins with Robert Root. The album was mixed and engineered by Robert Root. Sprinkled with sixties psychedelic foundations, jazz fusion, and progressive rock, the album is very different from the work he is known for in the Killers.

Stoermer talked about the songwriting process behind the single "Filthy Apes and Lions": I was doing a stream-of-consciousness, surrealistic exercise where you just write out whatever's on the top of your head, and then I started creating rhymes, not really knowing where I was going, and then that's where I got the lyrics for the song [...] "Filthy Apes and Lions."

== Personal life ==
As of 2025, Stoermer is married and has a stepdaughter.

== Artistry ==
=== Playing style ===
Stoermer mainly plays with a pick. He says "I love the punch and grit of a pick. [...] I do a lot of unconscious palm muting. I love how you can instantly get that clunky tone with shorter notes. It's a great sound." He tries to play the bass as a "half percussive, [...] half melodic instrument". Stoermer feels that "you can add to a song's melodic side without taking away from the vocals. That's my favorite kind of bass playing." His signature bass playing is featured prominently in the Killers' debut and sophomore albums.

While his aggressive playing was a focal point in the Killers' first two albums, Stoermer's playing became more funk-driven in Day & Age, and much more reserved and subtle in Battle Born. His style of playing has influenced many other bands and even a genre of music in bass-driven New Wave-synth rock.

Stoermer was featured on the cover of Bass Guitar Magazine in June 2009 and has been interviewed by other major bass guitar publications including Bass Player Magazine.

Stoermer is widely recognized for his signature tone: an overdriven signal using two modified BOSS Blues Driver pedals fed into separate amplifiers using high top-end frequencies to produce a trebly but thick, cutting sound while retaining excellent bass response, similar to that of Chris Squire (bassist of the band Yes).

Stoermer is also noted for heavily accenting his notes to produce string popping, as well as his use of jumping between octaves.

=== Influences ===
Stoermer cites influences such as Noel Redding of the Jimi Hendrix Experience, John Entwistle of the Who, and Paul McCartney of the Beatles and solo. He also lists the Cure, U2, and New Order as influences.

== Equipment ==
Basses:

- Fender Jazz Basses (Geddy Lee signature model)
- Rickenbacker 4001 Bass
- Gibson SG Bass (Very rarely used)
- Fender Vintage Precision Bass
- Guild Starfire Bass
- Höfner 500/1

During the recording of Hot Fuss, Stoermer had been using a Fender Geddy Lee Jazz Bass for his main bass, but had switched over to a vintage Fender Precision Bass and Rickenbacker 4001 for the recording of Sam's Town. After recording and touring for Sam's Town had concluded, he switched back to the Geddy Lee as his primary bass and started broadening his equipment repertoire, using other basses for the recording of Day & Age, such as the Starfire for "This is Your Life" and the Höfner 500/1 on "Joy Ride".

Guitars:

- Gibson SG – On the Song "For Reasons Unknown"
- Gibson ES-335 (Occasionally used instead of the SG for live performances of "For Reasons Unknown"; this instrument belongs to and is a backup instrument of bandmate Dave Keuning's)
- Gibson J-45 Acoustic Guitar
- Gibson SJ-200 Acoustic Guitar
- All are strung with medium-gauge GHS Bass Boomers. Basses are tuned to standard or down a 1/2 step (Drop-Db on the song "Sam's Town"), and guitars tuned a 1/2 step down to Eb for playing the rhythm portions of "For Reasons Unknown" during live performances.

Gear:

- Ampeg SVT Classic Head and 8x10" SVT Cabinets
- Hiwatt Custom 200 Head (one dirty, one clean) and Hiwatt SE-1510 4x10+1x15 cabs (x2, one rig with effects, one clean)
- Fender Deville 2x12"
- BOSS DS-1 distortion pedal
- BOSS GE-7 EQ pedal
- Big Muff Sovtek Big Muff pedal (for live performances of 'Andy, You're a Star')
- BOSS BD-2 Blues Driver (modified) (x2)
- BOSS GEB-7 Bass EQ (for volume boost)
- TC Electronic chorus/flanger
- MXR Phase 100
- Big Muff pi (Electro Harmonix Keeley modded)
- Dunlop CryBaby 535Q (18volts) Wah Wah pedal
- JHS Unicorn Rotary
- MXR M-108 Ten Band Graphic EQ Equalizer
- Electro Harmonix Memory Toy Delay
- Zaolla Artist and Zaolla Silverline series cables as instrument leads, cable speakers, and cable snakes

Picks: Dunlop Nylon – 1.00 mm

== Filmography ==
=== Television ===
Year	Title	Role	Notes
2004	Late Show with David Letterman	Himself	Performing "Somebody Told Me" as the Killers
2005	The Tonight Show With Jay Leno	Himself	Performing "Mr. Brightside" and "All These Things That I've Done" as the Killers
2005	Saturday Night Live	Himself	Performing "Mr. Brightside" and "Somebody Told Me" as the Killers
2006	Saturday Night Live	Himself	Performing "When You Were Young" and "Bones" as the Killers
2006	Late Show with David Letterman	Himself	Performing "When You Were Young" as the Killers
2006	The Tonight Show With Jay Leno	Himself	Performing "Bones"/"A Great Big Sled" as the Killers
2008	Saturday Night Live	Himself	Performing "Human" and "Spaceman" as the Killers
2009	The Tonight Show With Jay Leno	Himself	Performing "Spaceman" as the Killers
2009	Late Show with David Letterman	Himself	Performing "A Dustland Fairytale" as the Killers
2012	Late Show with David Letterman	Himself	Performing "Runaways" as the Killers
2013	Jimmy Kimmel Live!	Himself	Performing "Old Man Jimmy (Is Soon to Die)" as the Killers
2014	Conan	Himself	Performing "Let It Down" with Dhani Harrison
2015	The Tonight Show Starring Jimmy Fallon	Himself	Performing "Drum + Fife" as the Smashing Pumpkins

== Discography ==
Solo albums

- Another Life (2011)
- Dark Arts (2016)
- Filthy Apes and Lions (2017)

Other appearances

- The Synthetic Love of Emotional Engineering (2013) – Vicky Cryer
- "Your Love Is Not Enough", "A Spade Is A Spade" (2014–15) – Bombay Heavy
- London By Day (2023) – The Smashing Pumpkins
