= David Hopkins (musician) =

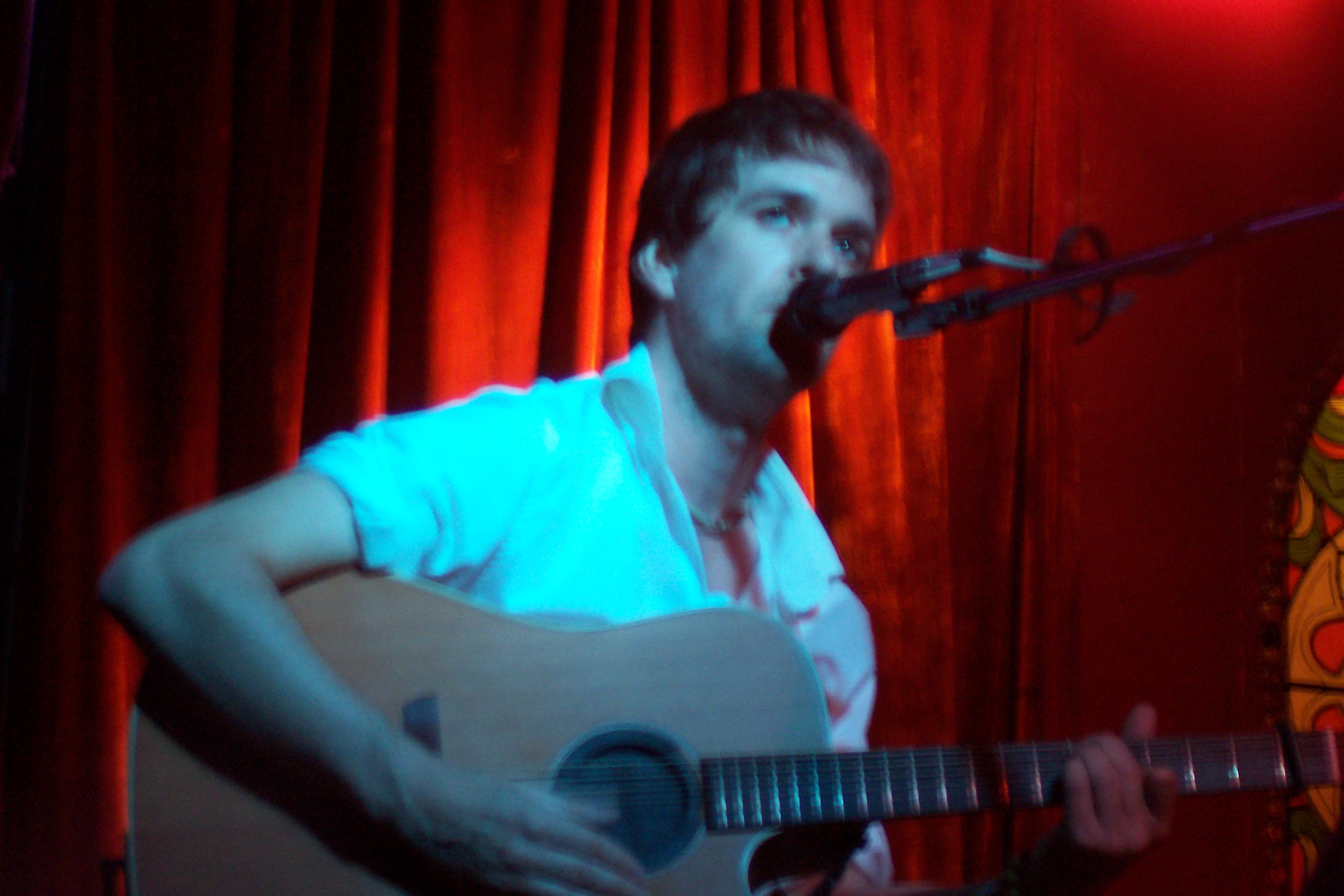
- David Hopkins

Background information
- Birth name: David Hopkins
- Origin: Dublin, Ireland
- Genres: folk rock, alternative rock
- Occupation: Singer-songwriter
- Instrument(s): Vocals, acoustic guitar, guitar, piano, keyboard
- Years active: 2001–present
- Labels: Reekus Records (IRL), St. August Records (US)

David Hopkins is an Irish singer-songwriter and producer, originally from Dublin, Ireland, and currently residing in Las Vegas, Nevada, United States. He was the original keyboardist for Irish alternative rock group LiR.

== LiR (1990s) ==
Hopkins launched his music career playing keyboard in the Dublin rock band LiR. The original lineup was David McGuiness on vocals, Robert Malone on bass, Ronan Byrne on guitar, David Hopkins on keyboards and Craig Hutchinson on drums. The group signed to What Are Records and released Magico, Magico, which went to No. 1 on the alternative albums chart and scored a UK top 10 hit, "In A Day," penned by Hopkins. They toured the US twelve times while Hopkins was with them, including with the Who.

== Solo career (1994–present) ==
In 1994, while touring in the US with LiR, Hopkins left the band and stayed in the US. After a move to San Francisco, Hopkins toured in support of the Who, playing keyboards for the opening band on the 1996 Quadrophenia Tour.

Hopkins then released the full-length album Here Comes The Bright Light, which Dublin Event Guide dubbed "a classic." Later he signed with independent label Reekus Records, with whom he released Amber and Green (2005) and the single "Merry Christmas My Love". The title track for Amber and Green can be heard on the soundtrack for Van Wilder 2: The Rise of Taj, and reached the Irish top 40 charts as did "Merry Christmas My Love".

In 2007 Hopkins released the album Running With Knives. Music from the album is featured in the soundtrack to Paris Hilton's 2008 movie The Hottie and the Nottie featuring Joel Moore. In 2009 Hopkins released the album There Are Debts.

Hopkins' songs found a larger audience through wide-release motion pictures such as Paris Hilton's The Hottie and the Nottie, Van Wilder 2: The Rise of Taj, Speed Dating, and The Year of Getting to Know Us, starring Jimmy Fallon, Lucy Liu and Sharon Stone. Tracks from this era can also be heard throughout MTV's The Real World: Austin and Missing.

Hopkins has performed his solo material with David Gray, Dan Reynolds (of Imagine Dragons), Matt Nathanson, Damien Rice, the Frames, Lindsey Stirling, Teitur, Jeff Buckley, Sinéad O'Connor, Bell X1 among others. Dan Reynolds of Imagine Dragons cited the Hopkins song "Jackson" as "an early and lasting influence" on BYUtv's Audio-Files.

== Bombay Heavy (2014–present) ==
Using the nom de plume "Barnabus Wu" Hopkins is the frontman for Bombay Heavy. The group draws its influence from the likes of classic rock bands such as Pink Floyd or Led Zeppelin, playing a kind of psychedelic rock & roll; a striking contrast to Hopkins' usual singer-songwriter style. The group's debut EP features Dave Keuning and Mark Stoermer of the Killers; two of their earliest gigs were opening for the Killers in 2016.

== Aubergine Electric (2015–present) ==
Hopkins, Rob Whited, Bobby Lee Parker, Tobias Ashmore, and Mac Burruss released their debut EP, "Unreachable On Mountain", in June 2015. The EP also featured Mark Stoermer.

== Other contributions ==
- (co-producer) Dark Arts (2016) – Mark Stoermer
- (co-producer) Filthy Apes and Lions (2017) – Mark Stoermer
- (co-producer) Eternal Reach (2018) – The Brummies (feat. Kacey Musgraves)
- (producer) Sweet Disarray EP (2018) - O WILDLY
- (co-songwriter) Segl (2020) - Eivør
- (producer and performer) Kenzo Cregan EP (2021) - Kenzo Cregan
- (producer) Fake Flowers EP (2021) - Kenzo Cregan
- (producer and performer) Ulysses (2021) - Jesse Pino
- (producer and performer) Glory (2021) - Jesse Pino

== Discography ==
=== Albums ===
- Over There, Jean-Pierre (1999)
- Here Comes The Bright Light (2001)
- Amber and Green (2005)
- Running With Knives (2007)
- Fake Fur Coat (2009)
- There Are Debts (2010)
- Overlook (2018)

=== EPs ===
- Scared Rabbit EP (2004)
- Merry Christmas My Love EP (2005)

=== Soundtracks ===
- "Amber & Green" – National Lampoon's Van Wilder: The Rise of Taj (2006)
- "Summer Song" – The Year of Getting to Know Us (2008)

=== Other ===
- Onda (Music for Chakras) (1992) – Joint project with Eric Albiez & Ljubo Majstorovic
- Tangara (1995) – Joint project with Eric Liorzou
- Reekus Christmas Compilation (2010) – "Merry Christmas My Love"
