= Flamingo (Brandon Flowers album) =

Studio album by Brandon Flowers
- Released: September 3, 2010
- Recorded: April 2010
- Studios: Henson (Hollywood, California) (Note: Tracks 1, 7 and 8); Battle Born (Winchester, Nevada) (Note: Tracks 2–6 and 9–14; additional recording on track 8)
- Genres: Soft rock; country pop; synth-pop
- Length: 40:58
- Label: Island
- Producers: Brandon Flowers; Daniel Lanois; Brendan O'Brien; Stuart Price

Brandon Flowers chronology
Flamingo (2010)	The Desired Effect (2015)

Singles from Flamingo
- 1. "Crossfire" Released: June 21, 2010; 2. "Only the Young" Released: October 12, 2010; 3. "Jilted Lovers & Broken Hearts" Released: February 21, 2011 (UK)

Flamingo is the debut solo studio album by American singer-songwriter Brandon Flowers, frontman of rock group the Killers, released on September 3, 2010, by Island Records. The album incorporates elements of soft rock and country pop, departing from the dance-rock and new wave influences of the Killers' 2008 studio album Day & Age. Produced by Flowers, Daniel Lanois, Brendan O'Brien, and Stuart Price, Flamingo features musicians such as Rilo Kiley frontwoman Jenny Lewis, fellow Killers members Dave Keuning and Ronnie Vannucci Jr., and guitarist Benji Lysaght.

Flamingo was written as a "ode" to Flowers' hometown of Las Vegas, exploring themes of religion, redemption, and his experiences growing in the city. The album was recorded in April 2010 at Battle Born Studios in Winchester, Nevada, and Henson Recording Studios in Hollywood, California. The album's lead single, "Crossfire", was released on June 21, 2010, and was certified Silver by the British Phonographic Industry (BPI). Succeeded by singles "Only the Young" and "Jilted Lovers & Broken Hearts", the album was ranked number thirty on Q's list of the 50 Best Albums of 2010, and debuted at number one on the UK Albums Chart.

== Background ==
After a mysterious countdown on The Killers' official website, Flowers confirmed on April 29, 2010, that he would be releasing a solo album titled Flamingo. The album is named after Flamingo Road in Flowers' hometown of Las Vegas, where many pivotal events in his life occurred: Sam's Town Casino is on Flamingo, his first job was at a golf course on that road, and he met his wife in a thrift store on the road as well. (Although there is also a Flamingo Casino, Flowers has stated that it was not the inspiration for the title).

Many songs on the album include references to Las Vegas. The track "Welcome to Fabulous Las Vegas" references Las Vegas Boulevard; "Was It Something I Said?" references Tropicana Avenue and a job at the Golden Nugget Las Vegas located on the Fremont Street Experience. "Magdalena" references a 60-mile pilgrimage from Nogales to Magdalena in Sonora, Mexico.

== Recording ==
The album was recorded primarily at Battle Born Studios in Winchester, Nevada. It was produced and mixed by Stuart Price, Daniel Lanois, and Brendan O'Brien. "Hard Enough" features a duet with Rilo Kiley frontwoman Jenny Lewis. "Welcome to Fabulous Las Vegas" features bandmate Dave Keuning, while "Playing with Fire" features bandmate Ronnie Vannucci, Jr.

== Promotion ==
The album's lead single "Crossfire" was premiered in the United Kingdom on Zane Lowe's BBC Radio 1 show on June 14, 2010. "Crossfire" was released soon after on June 21, 2010, in the United States and Canada via iTunes, and on August 23, 2010, in the United Kingdom. "Swallow It" was released as a promotional track from the album on August 24, 2010, via iTunes. "Only the Young" was released as the album's second single on October 12, 2010. An accompanying music video—filmed at Le Rêve at Wynn Las Vegas—premiered online on October 5, 2010, and was directed by Sophie Muller, who worked on the American video for "Mr. Brightside". "Jilted Lovers & Broken Hearts" was released in the UK as the third single from the album on February 21, 2011, without a single cover or music video.

Flowers performed "Crossfire" on Alan Carr: Chatty Man on September 1, 2010, and on The Tonight Show with Jay Leno on September 13. On September 6, 2010, Flowers played a 10-song set at Maida Vale Studios on BBC Radio 1. He performed both "Crossfire" and "Magdalena" on Jimmy Kimmel Live! on September 14, 2010, and on Live from Abbey Road on July 20, 2011. Flowers appeared on Later with Jools Holland on September 21, 2010, performing "Crossfire", "Only the Young", and "Magdalena".

== Critical reception ==
Professional ratings
Aggregate scores
Source	Rating
Metacritic	59/100
Review scores
Source	Rating
AllMusic	3/5 stars
The A.V. Club	B−
Billboard	4/5 stars
Entertainment Weekly	B
The Guardian	3/5 stars
The Independent	3/5 stars
Mojo	3/5 stars
Q	3/5 stars
Rolling Stone	3/5 stars
Spin	5/10

Flamingo received mixed reviews from music critics. At Metacritic, which assigns a normalized rating out of 100 to reviews from mainstream publications, the album received an average score of 59, based on 25 reviews. musicOMH published a positive review stating, "It's clear from Flamingo that Flowers accounts for the lion's share of talent in The Killers, and if they ever go on definite hiatus, their fans can look forward to more consistently good material in the form of Flowers' solo albums." Jody Rosen of Rolling Stone described Flowers' penchant for weaving beautiful losers into his songs by stating, "It would be laughable if Flowers wasn't 100 percent committed, and if the hooks on Flamingo weren't irresistible. He is, and they are - and you'll be too busy singing along to giggle." Alix Buscovic of BBC compared tracks "Welcome to Fabulous Las Vegas" and "Crossfire" to stadium albums Sam's Town and Day & Age and tracks "Magdalena" and "Was It Something I Said?" to 80s pop sensibility album Hot Fuss. Ryan Dombal for The Village Voice described Flowers as "a combination of Bono's brassiness, Morrissey's high drama, and Ian Curtis's spasmodic awkwardness, the singer represents an endangered species in 2010: a genuine arena-ready rock-'n'-roll deity who, at 29, isn't yet on blood thinners."

The album was ranked number thirty on Q's list of the 50 Best Albums of 2010.

== Commercial performance ==
On the UK Albums Chart, the album debuted at the number-one spot on September 12 and remained on the chart for 14 weeks. As of May 2015, the album had sold 263,681 copies in the United Kingdom.

On the US Billboard 200, Flamingo debuted at number eight, with 41,000 copies sold and remained on the chart for eight weeks. The album has sold 137,000 copies in the US as of May 2015.

The single "Crossfire" reached the top 10 on the UK Singles Chart, Irish Singles Chart, Belgium Singles Chart (Flanders), and Billboard's Alternative Songs chart.

== Covers ==
In 2015, Martin Gore of Depeche Mode covered "On the Floor" at a benefit with his son in Santa Barbara.

== Track listing ==
All track written by Brandon Flowers, except where noted.

No.	Title	Writer(s)	Producer(s)	Length
1.	"Welcome to Fabulous Las Vegas"		Brendan O'Brien	4:48
2.	"Only the Young"		Stuart Price	4:19
3.	"Hard Enough" (featuring Jenny Lewis)	Flowers; Daniel Lanois; Lewis; Benji Lysaght	Price; Lanois; Flowers	4:05
4.	"Jilted Lovers & Broken Hearts"	Flowers; Lanois; Price	Price; Lanois; Flowers	4:40
5.	"Playing with Fire"	Flowers; Lanois	Price; Lanois; Flowers	5:48
6.	"Was It Something I Said?"	Flowers; Lanois; Lewis	Price; Lanois; Flowers	3:19
7.	"Magdalena"		O'Brien	3:19
8.	"Crossfire"		O'Brien	4:18
9.	"On the Floor"		Price; Lanois; Flowers	3:23
10.	"Swallow It"		Price; Flowers	2:57
Total length:				40:58

Deluxe edition bonus tracks
No.	Title	Writer(s)	Producer(s)	Length
11.	"The Clock Was Tickin'"		Price; Flowers	4:49
12.	"Jacksonville"		Price; Flowers	4:01
13.	"I Came Here to Get Over You"		Price; Flowers	2:21
14.	"Right Behind You"	Flowers; Price	Price; Flowers	3:53
15.	"On the Floor 2.0" (iTunes pre-order and Japan bonus track)		Flowers	3:12
Total length:				59:14

== Personnel ==
Credits adapted from the liner notes of the deluxe edition of Flamingo.

=== Musicians ===
- Brandon Flowers – vocals (all tracks); synth (tracks 1–7, 10–14) arrangement (track 2); piano (tracks 7, 8, 10); guitar (track 10)
- Stuart Price – synth (tracks 1–4, 9, 10, 12–14); guitar (tracks 1, 2); arrangement, slide guitar (track 2); programming (tracks 2, 5, 6, 9, 14); bass (tracks 2–6, 10, 13)
- Benji Lysaght – guitar (tracks 1, 3–5, 10, 11, 13); 12-string electric guitar (track 6); electric guitar (tracks 12, 14); pedal steel (track 14)
- Daniel Lanois – guitar (tracks 1, 3, 4, 9); pedal steel, dub sonics (track 5); Omnichord (track 6)
- Dave Keuning – guitar (track 1)
- Brendan O'Brien – timpani, guitar, tubular bells (track 1); bass, acoustic guitar, backing vocals (tracks 1, 7, 8); tambourine, shaker (tracks 1, 7); electric guitar (tracks 7, 8); castanet, hurdy-gurdy (track 7); bells, B-3 organ, percussion (track 8)
- Victor Indrizzo – drums (tracks 1, 7, 8)
- Ronnie Vannucci Jr. – arrangement (track 2); drums, percussion (track 5)
- Jenny Lewis – vocals (track 3)
- Darren Beckett – drums (tracks 3–6, 9, 10, 11–13); percussion (tracks 3–6, 9, 10, 11, 13); additional drums (track 14)
- Herschel Gaer – acoustic guitar (track 4); bass (track 11)
- The Las Vegas Mass Choir – backing vocals (track 9)
- Jake Blanton – acoustic guitar, piano, backing vocals (track 11)
- Daniel de los Reyes – percussion (track 12)
- Donald E. Chaney – backing vocals (track 12)
- James R. Smith – backing vocals (track 12)
- LaMont Brown – backing vocals (track 12)
- Veronica "Lady V" Morton – backing vocals (track 14)

=== Technical ===
- Brendan O'Brien – production (tracks 1, 7, 8); mixing (tracks 7, 8)
- Tom Syrowski – recording (tracks 1, 7, 8)
- Martin Cooke – recording assistance (tracks 1, 7, 8)
- Nicolas Essig – recording assistance (tracks 1, 7, 8)
- Peter Stanislaus – recording assistance (tracks 1, 7, 8)
- Stuart Price – mixing (tracks 1–6, 9, 10); production (tracks 2–6, 9–14)
- Robert Root – recording (tracks 2–6, 9, 11–14); additional recording (track 8); recording assistance (track 10)
- Josh Baker – recording assistance (tracks 2–6, 9, 10, 12–14)
- Daniel Lanois – production (tracks 3–6, 9)
- Brandon Flowers – production (tracks 3–6, 9–14)
- Tim Young – mastering

=== Artwork ===
- Williams + Hirakawa – cover and interior photography
- Lucy Hamblin – cover and interior photography
- Warren Fu – art direction, label artwork, graphic design
- Kristen Yiengst – art and photography coordination

== Charts ==
=== Weekly charts ===
Chart (2010)	Peak position
Australian Albums (ARIA)	5
Austrian Albums (Ö3 Austria)	21
Belgian Albums (Ultratop Flanders)	24
Belgian Albums (Ultratop Wallonia)	29
Canadian Albums (Billboard)	9
Danish Albums (Hitlisten)	26
Dutch Albums (Album Top 100)	4
European Albums (Billboard)	4
French Albums (SNEP)	78
German Albums (Offizielle Top 100)	8
Greek International Albums (IFPI)	3
Irish Albums (IRMA)	3
Italian Albums (FIMI)	42
Mexican Albums (Top 100 Mexico)	16
New Zealand Albums (RMNZ)	6
Norwegian Albums (VG-lista)	12
Scottish Albums (Official Charts)	1
Spanish Albums (Promusicae)	7
Swedish Albums (Sverigetopplistan)	25
Swiss Albums (Schweizer Hitparade)	13
UK Albums (Official Charts)	1
US Billboard 200	8
US Top Alternative Albums (Billboard)	3
US Top Rock Albums (Billboard)	4

=== Year-end charts ===
Chart (2010)	Position
European Albums (Billboard)	86
UK Albums (OCC)	55

== Certifications ==
Region	Certification	Certified units/sales
Ireland (IRMA)	Gold	7,500^{^}
United Kingdom (BPI)	Gold	263,681
^{^} Shipments figures based on certification alone.

== Release history ==
Region	Date
Australia	September 3, 2010
Germany	September 3, 2010
Netherlands	September 3, 2010
Ireland	September 3, 2010
United Kingdom	September 6, 2010
United States	September 14, 2010
Canada	September 14, 2010
Brazil	September 21, 2010
France	September 27, 2010

== See also ==
- List of UK Albums Chart number ones of the 2010s
