= Crossfire (Brandon Flowers song) =

2010 single by Brandon Flowers

Single by Brandon Flowers

from the album Flamingo
- B-side: "On the Floor 2.0"
- Released: June 21, 2010 (US); August 23, 2010 (UK)
- Recorded: April 3, 2010
- Genre: Pop rock
- Length: 4:17 (album version); 3:59 (radio edit)
- Label: Island
- Songwriter: Brandon Flowers
- Producer: Brendan O'Brien

Brandon Flowers singles chronology
"Crossfire" (2010)	"Only the Young" (2010)

Music video
- "Crossfire" on YouTube

"Crossfire" is the debut solo single from the singer-songwriter and the Killers frontman Brandon Flowers. Written by Flowers himself, and produced by Brendan O'Brien, it is the first single from his debut solo album, Flamingo. A video for the single was released on July 8, 2010, and features actress Charlize Theron.

== Release and promotion ==
"Crossfire" first appeared when it was leaked online on June 11, 2010. On June 14, it was premiered in the UK on the Zane Lowe Show on BBC Radio 1, where Flowers also gave an interview.

A 10-inch picture disc vinyl was released in the US on August 3, 2010, featuring an acoustic version of "On the Floor" titled "On the Floor 2.0" on the B-side. On the week of the August 23, Flowers was officially the most played artist on the BBC, despite only having one song available for airplay. "Crossfire" was on both the A playlist for BBC Radio 1 and BBC Radio 2. On September 6, "Crossfire" was No. 1 on the NME chart and remained so through September 27 for several weeks.

== Critical reception ==
The song received mixed reviews from critics. Rolling Stone gave the song two-and-a-half stars, saying it "sounds like a Killers B side — standard-issue Boss-meets-Bono dance rock, with Flowers serving up so much meteorological-metaphor fury, you'll want to call FEMA." Of the track, Billboard said "Flowers simply follows the pop direction that his band has taken of late," and that "Flowers may sound a little too eager to assign an epic quality to his first effort as a solo artist, but 'Crossfire' still hints at a promising direction for Flamingo." USA Today said of the song that "The Killers' frontman kicks off solo debut Flamingo with a soaring pop/rock anthem in the band's comfort zone." Flowers said that it is his son Ammon's favorite song on the album.

== Music video ==
The music video premiered on July 8, 2010 on Vevo. It was directed by Australian film director Nash Edgerton and stars actress Charlize Theron. The video features various scenes involving Flowers being tied up as a hostage. Theron kills several ninjas before rescuing him each time. The final scene shows Theron putting her arm around Flowers, while driving away with him in a pick-up truck.

In an interview with Fuse, Flowers revealed that Theron is a fan of The Killers, and that she was interested in being a part of the video. She also led him to Edgerton, who was ultimately chosen to direct the video.

== Track listings ==
iTunes download

1. "Crossfire" – 4:17

Promo CD

1. "Crossfire" (radio version) – 3:59
2. "Crossfire" (album version) – 4:17
3. "Crossfire" (instrumental) – 4:17

10-inch picture disc

1. "Crossfire" – 4:17
2. "On the Floor 2.0" – 3:10

== Personnel ==
Credits taken from the liner notes of Flamingo.

- Brandon Flowers – vocals, piano
- Brendan O'Brien – bass, electric guitar, acoustic guitar, bells, B-3 organ, percussion, backing vocals
- Victor Indrizzo – drums

== Charts ==
=== Weekly charts ===
Chart (2010)	Peak position
Australia (ARIA)	46
Austria (Ö3 Austria Top 40)	52
Belgium (Ultratip Bubbling Under Flanders)	3
Belgium (Ultratip Bubbling Under Wallonia)	49
Canada Hot 100 (Billboard)	70
Denmark (Tracklisten)	40
European Hot 100 Singles (Billboard)	23
Germany (GfK)	34
Ireland (IRMA)	4
Israel International Airplay (Media Forest)	8
Japan Hot 100 (Billboard)	64
Netherlands (Dutch Top 40)	19
Netherlands (Single Top 100)	22
New Zealand (Recorded Music NZ)	22
Poland (Polish Airplay New)	5
Scottish Singles Sales (Official Charts)	5
Switzerland (Schweizer Hitparade)	35
UK Singles (Official Charts)	8
US Bubbling Under Hot 100 (Billboard)	3
US Adult Pop Airplay (Billboard)	22
US Dance Club Songs (Billboard)	5
US Hot Rock & Alternative Songs (Billboard)	11

=== Year-end charts ===
Chart (2010)	Position
US Hot Rock & Alternative Songs (Billboard)	39

== Certifications ==
Region	Certification	Certified units/sales
United Kingdom (BPI)	Silver	200,000^{‡}
^{‡} Sales+streaming figures based on certification alone.
