= Private Stock (album) =

Studio album by The Grapes
- Released: March 14, 1995
- Genre: Rock, blues rock, jam
- Length: 45:15
- Label: Intersound Records
- Producer: John Keane

The Grapes chronology
High or Low (1992)	Private Stock (1995)	Juice (1997)

Professional ratings
Review scores
Source	Rating
AllMusic	link

Private Stock is the 1995 album by Atlanta, Georgia-based band The Grapes.

== Track listing ==
1. Been Gone Too Long
2. If You Got A Gun
3. Salvation
4. Someday
5. Jozetta
6. Somewhere New
7. New Song
8. One Of These Days
9. Walking Under Ladders
10. Mama Flew
11. Above The Moon
