= Mr. Brightside =

2003 single by the Killers

- Standard artwork of the 2004 re-release

Single by the Killers

from the album Hot Fuss
- B-side: "Smile Like You Mean It"; "On Top"; "Who Let You Go?"; "Change Your Mind"
- Released: September 29, 2003
- Studio: Kill the Messenger (Henderson, Nevada); Cornerstone (Berkeley, California)
- Genre: Alternative rock; new wave; synth-pop; pop rock; power pop; synth-rock; post-punk
- Length: 3:43
- Label: Island; Lizard King
- Songwriters: Brandon Flowers; Dave Keuning
- Producers: Jeff Saltzman; The Killers

The Killers singles chronology
"Mr. Brightside" (2003)	"Somebody Told Me" (2004)

Music videos
- "Mr. Brightside" on YouTube; "Mr. Brightside" (US version) on YouTube

"Mr. Brightside" is a song by American rock band the Killers. It appears on their debut studio album, Hot Fuss (2004). Written by band members Brandon Flowers and Dave Keuning, it was one of the first songs the Killers ever wrote. Two music videos were made for the song: the first one was shot in black and white and features the band performing in an empty room, and the second one was based on the 2001 film Moulin Rouge!

The song was released as the Killers' debut single on September 29, 2003, but became more popular when re-released in 2004, peaking at number 10 in both the United States and the United Kingdom. It is the Killers' best-selling song in the US, where it has sold over 3.5 million copies. In the United Kingdom, it is the third biggest selling/streaming song of all time and is the longest-charting single on the UK Official Singles Chart Top 100, having spent over 500 weeks (10 years) on the chart, and is the most streamed track released prior to 2010. It is also one of the top fifteen most downloaded rock tracks ever in the United Kingdom and is the most successful single to never top the British charts. It is one of only two songs to have been certified 10× Platinum by the British Phonographic Industry for 6 million units.

"Mr. Brightside" was named "Song of the Decade" by UK radio stations Absolute Radio and XFM, and in April 2010 Last.fm revealed that it was the most-listened-to track since the launch of the online music service, with the track being played over 7.66 million times. In October 2010, it was voted ninth in the Greatest Guitar Riffs of the 21st century so far by Total Guitar magazine. Additionally, in 2010 Rolling Stone listed "Mr. Brightside" as the 48th-best song of the 2000s decade, and in 2021, it was ranked number 378 in the same magazine's "500 Greatest Songs of All Time" list.

== Recording and production ==
Lyrically, "Mr. Brightside" depicts a true story of Brandon Flowers' jealousy and paranoia when he walked into a bar in Las Vegas and found his girlfriend cheating on him. Flowers began writing the song after gaining inspiration from the end of his first relationship while staying in his sister's room. "I was asleep and I knew something was wrong," he said. "I have these instincts. I went to the Crown and Anchor, a bar in Vegas, and my girlfriend was there with another guy."

Guitarist Dave Keuning composed the music before meeting Flowers. Flowers then wrote lyrics and composed the chorus after hearing Keuning's ideas. Flowers credits the speed of the song's creation to its having only one verse. He says, "We went in and made demos pretty quickly after that, and it took a ton of time. That's also why there's not a second verse... I just didn't have any other lines, and it ended up sticking." Drummer Ronnie Vannucci Jr. is credited with creating the fast-paced drum beat in the first twenty-two seconds. The "calling a cab" section of the song has both a musical and textual similarity to the middle section of the song "Queen Bitch" from David Bowie's album Hunky Dory (1971). He also took inspiration from Iggy Pop's "monotone delivery" on his Lust for Life (1977) song "Sixteen".

"Mr. Brightside"
Sample of the song's chorus.

The song was mixed for its inclusion on Hot Fuss by Mark Needham, along with business partners Braden Merrick and Jeff Saltzman. The song was first created as a reference mix in just over half an hour "on an 8-input console, with no automation" according to Needham. Despite several subsequent remixes, the members of the Killers preferred the original one, which then made it onto the record. In recording the vocal effects, Saltzman used Echo Farm, sticking with the default vocal effects setting. Needham says it "overdrives the vocal a bit and sets an 84 ms delay."

"Mr. Brightside" is written in the key of D♭ major with a moderately fast tempo of around 148 BPM.

== History ==
An early demo of the song featured Dave Keuning on bass and Matt Norcross on drums, before Mark Stoermer and Ronnie Vannucci were members of the band. The original demo was officially released on the 2013 compilation album Direct Hits. On the Killers' 2012 album Battle Born, they released "Miss Atomic Bomb", which Flowers considered a companion song to "Mr. Brightside".

In their first performance together as the Killers, Flowers and Keuning played "Mr. Brightside" as part of a two-song open-mic night set at Las Vegas' Cafe Roma. Of the performance, Flowers says "It was terrible, awful." In November 2001, the group had recorded "Mr. Brightside" along with three other demos including "Desperate", "Replaceable", and "Under the Gun" at Mike Sak's Kill the Messenger Studio in Henderson, Nevada. They handed out a demo of the song for free during their shows in 2002. After signing with UK indie label Lizard King Records, the track was sent to radio as a buzz single and it was frequently played by BBC Radio 1 DJ's Zane Lowe and Steve Lamacq as well as being play-listed by XFM. Just one week after its April release, MTV2 secured a deal to air the song for a week.

The Killers performed the song live on the rooftop of Caesars Palace during halftime of the Las Vegas Raiders' first-ever home game at Allegiant Stadium on September 21, 2020; the halftime show was broadcast on U.S. television on ESPN and ABC's simulcast coverage of Monday Night Football.

== Reception ==
In one of the song's first reviews, The Washington Post stated, "dashing through the tune as if it were a power ballad on speed, Flowers and company had the capacity crowd pulsing along with glee." "Mr. Brightside" became a popular song within the Las Vegas music scene with one reviewer calling it a "feel-good anthem that ranks as one of the best local tracks in a long time". In positive reviews, NME said the song was filled with "ambition, sex, and noise" while Rolling Stone described the song as having "swelled with anthemic majesty". The Guardian considered "Mr. Brightside" to be the most overplayed song, and noted that it has been played "on the radio. In the supermarket. In the pub. The office. In a cab. Thrumming through your neighbours' wall. [...] Blasted out at every party or wedding you'll attend for the rest of your life." In 2020, Paste ranked the song number 3 on their list of the 20 greatest Killers songs, and in 2021, American Songwriter ranked the song number 1 on their list of the 10 greatest Killers songs.

== Commercial performance ==
"Mr. Brightside" entered the Billboard Hot 100 at number 40 on February 12, 2005, and peaked at number ten on June 11, thus making it a sleeper hit. The song reached 3.5 million in sales in 2016.

In 2005, "Mr. Brightside" was the sixth most downloaded song on iTunes and sold 889,323 digital copies in the US. To this day "Mr. Brightside" still has the highest popularity rating that iTunes offers, even after being available for purchase for nearly 20 years. Additionally, sales of Hot Fuss album reached over five million sales by 2006. The online music streaming service Last.fm reported in 2010 that "Mr. Brightside" was the most downloaded song on the website. By July 2014, the song sold more than 820,000 copies in the United Kingdom, making it the UK's No. 12 most downloaded rock track of all time.

In April 2021, the song became the first to spend 260 weeks, or five years, on the UK Singles Chart. As of 2017, it had charted on the UK Singles Chart in 11 of the last 13 years, including a 35-week run peaking at number 49 between July 2016 and March 2017. By 2026, the song's total number of weeks on the chart had surpassed 500. As of August 2026, the band's official video on YouTube (version 2) of the song, has seen views exceed 648 million.

The song was the UK's most streamed pre-2010 song, until it was surpassed by Oasis' "Wonderwall" in late 2018, and continued to be purchased for download hundreds of times a week by 2017. In March 2018, the song reached the milestone of staying in the Top 100 of the UK Singles Chart for 200 weeks. Explanations have included the song's popularity at parties, its popularity on streaming services, and the continued presence of the Killers as a popular live band in the UK. According to the Official Charts Company, the song has been streamed 281 million times in the UK and has sold 3,520,000 copies there as of April 2021.

In May 2024, "Mr. Brightside" overtook Oasis' "Wonderwall" to become the UK's most successful song of all time that had not reached number one.

In April 2026, "Mr. Brightside" reached 400 weeks in total on Ireland's singles charts, despite never having been in the Irish top 40.

== Music videos ==
There are two videos for Mr. Brightside: the first version (also known as the UK version) was filmed in Staten Island, New York, and was directed by Brad and Brian Palmer under their studio Surround. Later on in the year and following the success of single "Somebody Told Me", their label Island Records decided to create a higher budget video for the US market: the second video (also known as the US version) was filmed in Los Angeles, California. Directed by Sophie Muller, the video stars Flowers, Izabella Miko, and Eric Roberts in a love triangle, occurring within the context of a burlesque show.

The US version won an MTV Video Music Award for Best New Artist in a Video at the 2005 MTV Video Music Awards, beating other nominees such as John Legend ("Ordinary People"), Ciara ("1, 2 Step"), The Game ("Dreams"), and My Chemical Romance ("Helena"). The photos featured on the inner sleeve of the album Hot Fuss were shot on set during the filming of the UK version music video and were inspired by the black and white look of that video.

== Notable releases and cover versions ==
In 2005, Stuart Price released a remix of the song under his pseudonym Jacques Lu Cont. Reviewers were generally negative: for example, Michael Paoletta said this version "depletes the song of its energy and intensity". That same year, this song as well as two others by the Killers ("Smile Like You Mean It" and "Somebody Told Me") reached the Billboard Top 20 single chart. An extended version of the Stuart Price remix of the song was featured on the Killers' 2007 B-side and rarities compilation, Sawdust. During the Flamingo Road Tour for Brandon Flowers' solo record Flamingo in 2010, he performed the remix version with Stuart Price during his show at Brixton Academy and has since performed it on his tour as the show closer, again in the remix form.

The song has been covered by many artistes and in a range of styles, including an acoustic bluegrass version on CMH Records' Bluegrass Tribute to The Killers and an a capella version by MIT's Resonance. Abi Sampa from The Voice UK series 2 recorded a mashup of "Mr. Brightside" and M.I.A.'s "Paper Planes". Kelly Clarkson covered the version live on The Kelly Clarkson Show.

== In popular culture ==
"Mr. Brightside" has been extensively used in media.

In the season 2 episode "The New Era" of the teen drama series The O.C., which aired on December 2, 2004, the Killers play various songs from Hot Fuss, including "Mr. Brightside", "Everything Will Be Alright", and "Smile Like You Mean It" during a scene involving a double-date in the Bait Shop.

In the 2006 romantic comedy The Holiday, Amanda Woods (portrayed by Cameron Diaz) sets the CD player to play the song, then ironically dances to it and shout-screams the chorus while drunk and holding a glass of red wine, to avoid remembering the infidelity of her boyfriend Ethan (Edward Burns).

In the 2023 film Saltburn, the song is briefly featured in a scene where Felix Catton (Jacob Elordi) and Oliver Quick (Barry Keoghan) are driving.

Additionally, the song has been used in a variety of sporting events.

The song has become a tradition among Michigan Wolverines football fans at Michigan Stadium, where fans in excess of 110,000 sing along to the tune when it is played in the fourth quarter. While the track was first played in an October 2016 game against Wisconsin, the tradition rose to prominence in 2017 when the crowd sang the second half of the chorus a cappella during a rain-soaked Michigan State game. It rose to further prominence during the resurgence in fortunes of the program in the early 2020s, including during the team's run to winning the 2023 national championship, their first since 1997. In the original release of EA Sports College Football 26, the video game honors this tradition between the third and fourth quarters of games at Michigan Stadium.

The song featured in the 2017 AFL premiership celebrations by Jack Riewoldt of the Richmond Tigers, who sang the song in its entirety live alongside the Killers.

English darts player Nathan Aspinall uses the song as his walk-on music, often resulting in sing-alongs with audiences.

Starting in December 2023, the Buffalo Bills play the song in the fourth quarter of home games accompanied by a lyric video. Additionally, videos were posted of the song and the team's reaction at Bills tight end Dawson Knox's wedding to Alex Seefeldt in the summer of 2024.

In July 2024, the Killers paused a concert during the Rebel Diamonds Tour in London to allow the fans to watch the end of the UEFA Euro 2024 semi-final match between England and the Netherlands, which England won 2–1 and advanced to the final. As the match ended, a series of red and white streamers were fired from cannons, with the band immediately launching into a rendition of Mr. Brightside. The band later posted on their Twitter account that they "played for England".

The song was played by the Killers at the 2026 UEFA Champions League final kick-off show. It was also regularly played during hydration breaks in the 2026 FIFA World Cup.

== Accolades ==
- BPI Pop Gem Hall of Fame Inductee (2014)
- Vevo Certified Over 200 Million Views (2017)

Accolades
Publication	Country	Accolade	Year	Rank
Absolute Radio	United Kingdom	100 Best Songs of the Decade	2009	1
Channel 4	United Kingdom	Greatest Songs of the Noughties	2009	2
Complex	United States	The 100 Best Songs of the Complex Decade	2012	74
KROQ	United States	Top Songs of 2005	2005	3
NME	United Kingdom	Best Tracks of 2004	2004	5
NME	United Kingdom	150 Best Tracks of the Past 15 Years	2011	5
NME	United Kingdom	100 Greatest Songs of NME's Lifetime 1952–2012	2012	83
Total Guitar	United Kingdom	Greatest Guitar Riffs of the 21st Century	2010	9
Triple J	Australia	Hottest 100 of 2004	2004	13
Rolling Stone	United States	100 Best Songs of the 2000s	2009	48
Pitchfork	United States	The Top 500 Tracks of the 2000s	2009	72
Pitchfork	United States	The Top 50 Singles of 2005	2005	18
VH1	United States	100 Greatest Songs of the '00s	2011	55
XFM	United Kingdom	Top 100 Songs of the Decade	2009	1
Triple J	Australia	Hottest 100 of All Time	2009	38
XFM	United Kingdom	The Top 1,000 Songs Of All Time	2010	1
NME	United Kingdom	The 500 Greatest Songs of All Time	2014	116
Triple J	Australia	Hottest 100 of the Past 20 Years	2013	7
BPI	United Kingdom	Most Streamed Songs Released Before 2010	2017	1
IRMA	Ireland	Most Streamed Track of the Noughties Decade	2020	1
Billboard	United States	The 100 Best Songs of 2005: Staff Picks	2025	1

== Awards ==
The song was nominated for a Grammy in 2006 for Best Pop Performance by a Duo or Group with Vocal, but lost to a live version of "This Love" by Maroon 5.

Awards
Year	Ceremony	Award	Result
2005	Billboard Music Awards	Digital Song of the Year	Nominated
2005	MTV Video Music Awards	Best Rock Video	Nominated
2005	MTV Video Music Awards	Best Group Video	Nominated
2005	MTV Video Music Awards	Best New Artist in a Video	Won
2005	MTV Video Music Awards	Best Art Direction	Nominated
2005	MuchMusic Video Awards	People's Choice: Favorite International Group	Nominated
2005	MuchMusic Video Awards	Best International Video – Group	Won
2005	TEC Awards	Outstanding Record Production Single or Track	Nominated
2006	Grammy Awards	Best Pop Performance by a Duo or Group with Vocals	Nominated
2006	Grammy Awards	Best Remixed Recording, Non-Classical	Nominated
2006	International Dance Music Awards	Best Alternative/Rock Dance Track	Nominated
2014	Official Charts Company	Pop Gem Hall of Fame	Inducted

== Track listings ==
UK 7-inch white vinyl single (2003)

A. "Mr Brightside"
B. "Smile Like You Mean It"

UK limited-edition CD single (2003)

1. "Mr Brightside"
2. "Smile Like You Mean It"
3. "On Top"
4. "Who Let You Go?"

UK limited-edition 7-inch red vinyl single (2004)

A. "Mr Brightside"
B. "Who Let You Go?"

UK CD1 (2004)

1. "Mr Brightside" (radio edit)
2. "Change Your Mind"

UK CD2 (2004)

1. "Mr Brightside" (album version)
2. "Somebody Told Me" (Insider remix)
3. "Midnight Show" (SBN live session)
4. "Mr Brightside" (enhanced video section)

Australian limited-edition CD single (2004)

1. "Mr Brightside"
2. "Somebody Told Me" (Josh Harris remix radio edit)
3. "Who Let You Go?"
4. "Mr Brightside" (video)

European CD single (2004)

1. "Mr Brightside" – 3:42
2. "Somebody Told Me" (Insider remix) – 5:00

European maxi-CD single (2004)

1. "Mr Brightside" – 3:42
2. "Somebody Told Me" (Insider remix) – 5:00
3. "Mr Brightside" (Jacques Lu Cont's Thin White Duke mix) – 8:48
4. "Mr Brightside" (original version video)

US 2×12-inch single (2005)

A. "Mr. Brightside" (Jacques Lu Cont's Thin White Duke remix)
B. "Mr. Brightside" (The Lindbergh Palace club remix)
C. "Mr. Brightside" (Jacques Lu Cont's Thin White Duke dub)
D1. "Mr. Brightside" (The Lindbergh Palace radio remix)
D2. "Mr. Brightside" (The Lindbergh Palace dub)

== Personnel ==
Personnel are adapted from the liner notes of Hot Fuss.

The Killers

- Brandon Flowers – vocals, synthesizer
- Dave Keuning – guitar
- Mark Stoermer – bass
- Ronnie Vannucci Jr. – drums

Production

- Jeff Saltzman – production, recording
- The Killers – production
- Dave Stedronsky – engineering assistance
- Mark Needham – engineering assistance, mixing
- Will Brierre – engineering assistance
- Jay Graham – engineering assistance
- Dario Dendi – engineering assistance
- Brian "Big Bass" Gardner – mastering
- (C) 2003 Island And Lizard King Records Ltd

== Charts ==
=== Weekly charts ===
Weekly chart performance
Chart (2004–2010)	Peak position
Australia (ARIA)	29
Austria (Ö3 Austria Top 40)	61
Canada CHR/Pop Top 30 (Radio & Records)	5
Canada Hot AC Top 30 (Radio & Records)	7
Canada Rock Top 30 (Radio & Records)	5
Germany (GfK)	69
Ireland (IRMA)	48
Italy (FIMI)	40
Netherlands (Single Top 100)	66
New Zealand (Recorded Music NZ)	15
Scottish Singles Sales (Official Charts)	12
UK Singles (Official Charts)	10
UK Independent (Official Charts)	1
US Billboard Hot 100	10
US Adult Pop Airplay (Billboard)	11
US Alternative Airplay (Billboard)	3
US Dance Club Songs (Billboard)	4
US Dance Airplay (Billboard)	6
US Pop Airplay (Billboard)	10

2021–2026 weekly chart performance
Chart (2021–2026)	Peak position
Australia (ARIA)	19
Austria (Ö3 Austria Top 40)	3
Czech Republic Singles Digital (ČNS IFPI)	46
Germany (GfK)	6
Germany Airplay (MusicTrace)	78
Global 200 (Billboard)	21
Greece International (IFPI)	89
Ireland (IRMA)	42
Latvia Streaming (LaIPA)	13
Lithuania (AGATA)	88
Luxembourg (Billboard)	13
Netherlands (Single Top 100)	71
Portugal (AFP)	104
Sweden (Sverigetopplistan)	51
Switzerland (Schweizer Hitparade)	31
UK Singles (Official Charts)	31
US Hot Rock & Alternative Songs (Billboard)	17

=== Year-end charts ===
2005 year-end chart performance
Chart (2005)	Position
US Billboard Hot 100	16
US Hot Dance Airplay (Billboard)	33
US Mainstream Top 40 (Billboard)	36
US Modern Rock Tracks (Billboard)	6

2007 year-end chart performance
Chart (2007)	Position
UK Singles (OCC)	127

2008 year-end chart performance
Chart (2008)	Position
UK Singles (OCC)	123

2009 year-end chart performance
Chart (2009)	Position
UK Singles (OCC)	180

2012 year-end chart performance
Chart (2012)	Position
UK Singles (OCC)	169

2013 year-end chart performance
Chart (2013)	Position
UK Singles (OCC)	184

2017 year-end chart performance
Chart (2017)	Position
UK Singles (OCC)	87

2018 year-end chart performance
Chart (2018)	Position
UK Singles (OCC)	80

2019 year-end chart performance
Chart (2019)	Position
UK Singles (OCC)	63

2020 year-end chart performance
Chart (2020)	Position
US Rock Streaming Songs (Billboard)	17
UK Singles (OCC)	61

2021 year-end chart performance
Chart (2021)	Position
Australia (ARIA)	51
UK Singles (OCC)	33

2022 year-end chart performance
Chart (2022)	Position
Australia (ARIA)	18
Global 200 (Billboard)	118
UK Singles (OCC)	29

2023 year-end chart performance
Chart (2023)	Position
Australia (ARIA)	29
New Zealand (Recorded Music NZ)	44
UK Singles (OCC)	22

2024 year-end chart performance
Chart (2024)	Position
Australia (ARIA)	34
Global 200 (Billboard)	131
UK Singles (OCC)	22

2025 year-end chart performance
Chart (2025)	Position
Argentina Anglo Airplay (Monitor Latino)	99
Australia (ARIA)	65
Austria (Ö3 Austria Top 40)	35
Belgium (Ultratop 50 Flanders)	116
Germany (GfK)	51
Global 200 (Billboard)	105
UK Singles (OCC)	31

=== Decade-end charts ===
Decade-end chart performance
Chart (2010–2019)	Position
UK Singles (OCC)	12

== Certifications ==
Certifications
Region	Certification	Certified units/sales
Australia (ARIA)	25× Platinum	1,750,000^{‡}
Brazil (Pro-Música Brasil)	2× Platinum	120,000^{‡}
Canada (Music Canada)	Diamond	800,000^{‡}
Germany (BVMI)	3× Platinum	900,000^{‡}
Italy (FIMI)	2× Platinum	200,000^{‡}
New Zealand (RMNZ)	13× Platinum	390,000^{‡}
Portugal (AFP)	4× Platinum	100,000^{‡}
Spain (Promusicae)	2× Platinum	120,000^{‡}
United Kingdom (BPI)	12× Platinum	7,200,000^{‡}
United States (RIAA)	Diamond	10,000,000^{‡}
Streaming
Greece (IFPI Greece)	2× Platinum	4,000,000^{†}
^{‡} Sales+streaming figures based on certification alone.^{†} Streaming-only figures based on certification alone.

== Release history ==
Release history and formats
Region	Date	Format(s)	Label(s)	Ref.
United Kingdom	September 29, 2003	7-inch vinyl; CD	Lizard King	
United Kingdom (re-release)	May 24, 2004	7-inch vinyl; CD	Lizard King	
United States	October 11, 2004	Alternative radio	Island	
United States	January 18, 2005	Hot adult contemporary; contemporary hit radio	Island	

== See also ==
- List of best-selling singles in Australia
