= List of songs recorded by the Killers =

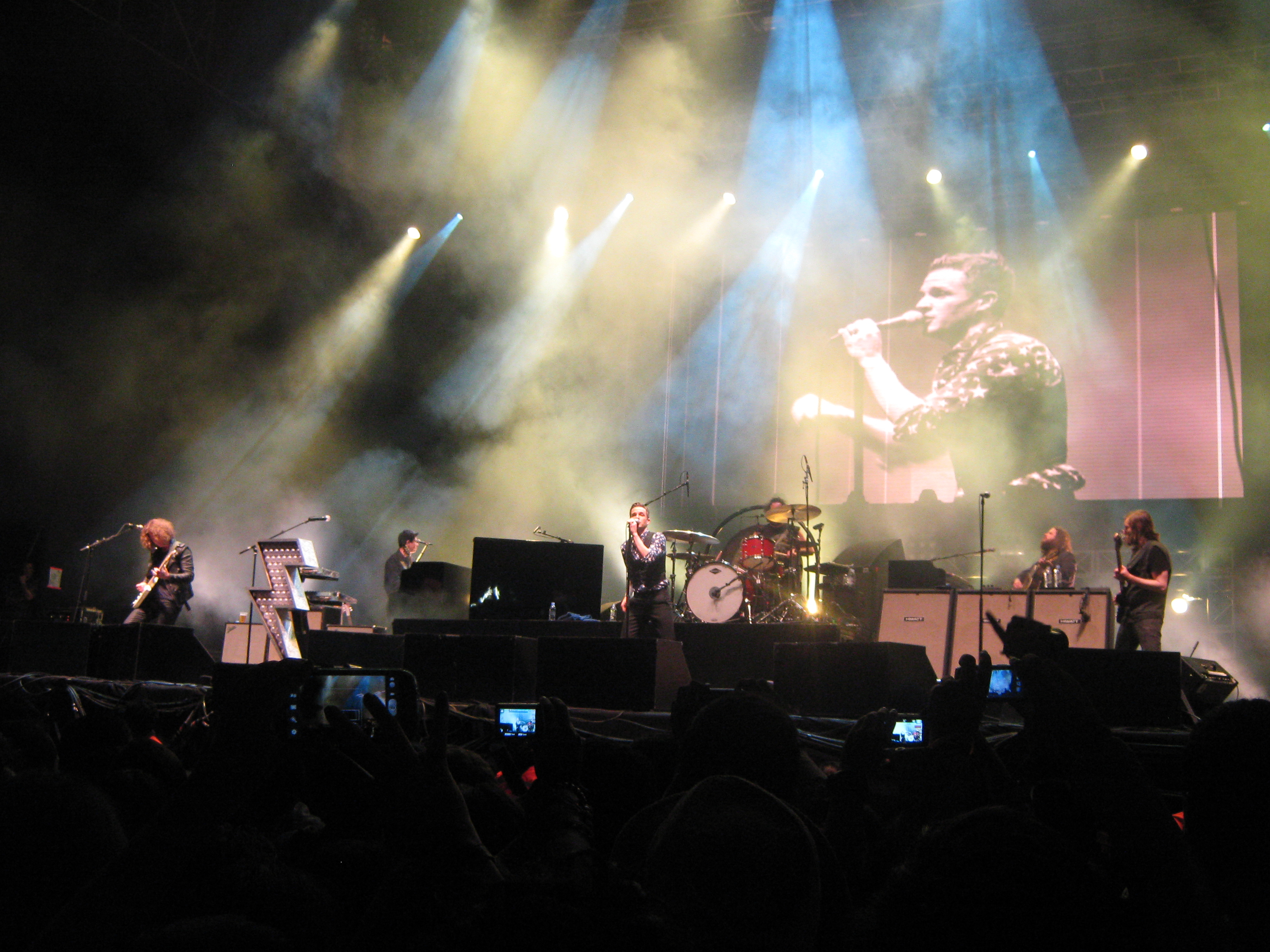
The Killers in 2013. From left to right: Dave Keuning, Brandon Flowers, Ronnie Vannucci Jr., and Mark Stoermer.

The American rock band the Killers have recorded material for seven studio albums throughout their career, as well as B-sides, demos, and covers. The band was formed in Las Vegas, Nevada in 2001 by Brandon Flowers and Dave Keuning; Mark Stoermer and Ronnie Vannucci Jr. solidified the line-up in 2002. The Killers signed a contract with Lizard King Records in July 2003, and released their debut single "Mr. Brightside" shortly after. The Killers signed to Island Def Jam (now Island Records) at the end of 2003, and released their debut album, Hot Fuss, in June 2004. It is considered a new wave, synth-rock, and post-punk album, and is regarded as a defining album in the post-punk revival movement of the early 2000s. It produced three other singles: "Somebody Told Me", "All These Things That I've Done", and "Smile Like You Mean It". "Mr. Brightside" and "All These Things That I've Done" each respectively earned one nomination at the 2005 Grammy Awards. Their second studio album, Sam's Town, was released in September 2006, and draws influences from new wave, indie rock and heartland rock. The album was preceded by the single "When You Were Young", which earned a nomination at the 2007 Grammy Awards. Influenced by artists such as Bruce Springsteen, Tom Petty and the Heartbreakers, and Dire Straits, the album produced three further singles: "Bones", "Read My Mind", and "For Reasons Unknown".

The Killers released their first compilation album, Sawdust, in November 2007. It contains B-sides from the singles from Hot Fuss and Sam's Town, as well as various rarities from their career. The album was supported by two singles: a cover of Joy Division's "Shadowplay", and "Tranquilize" featuring Lou Reed. Their third studio album, Day & Age, was released in November 2008. It is considered a dance-rock, synth-pop, and new wave album, described conceptually as a "continuation" of Sam's Town. The album spawned four singles: "Human", "Spaceman", "The World We Live In", and "A Dustland Fairytale". Following a short hiatus, the band returned with their fourth studio album, Battle Born, in September 2012. It is described as an arena rock, new wave, and Americana album, drawing comparisons to the sound of Sam's Town. The album became the band's fourth to consecutively top the UK Albums Chart, and it produced three singles: "Runaways", "Miss Atomic Bomb" and "Here With Me". The band's first greatest hits album, Direct Hits, was released in November 2013, and was supported by two singles, "Shot at the Night" and "Just Another Girl", both of which had been previously unreleased.

Their fifth studio album, Wonderful Wonderful, was released in September 2017. It is regarded as an indie pop, heartland rock, disco-rock, synth-rock, and new wave album. The album focuses on themes of masculinity and success, but also family and faith. Lead single "The Man" became the band's second number one single on Billboard Adult Alternative Airplay chart. The album was the band's first to top the Billboard 200, and it produced two further singles: "Run for Cover" and "Rut". The Killers released their sixth studio album, Imploding the Mirage, in August 2020; it is their only album created without Keuning. It is considered a heartland rock, alternative rock, arena rock, new wave, and synth-rock album. The album was supported by the singles "Caution", "My Own Soul's Warning" and "Dying Breed". The band released their seventh studio album, Pressure Machine, less than a year later. Released in August 2021, it is the band's only album created without Stoermer. It is described as an Americana, heartland rock, and folk rock album, with many critics comparing it to Bruce Springsteen's Nebraska (1982). Pressure Machine is a concept album that focuses on Flowers' childhood growing up in Nephi, Utah, and was the Killers's first album to be released without any accompanying singles. (Note: "Quiet Town" and "Runaway Horses", as well as "The Getting By II" from the deluxe edition, were issued as promotional singles.) The Killers began work on their eighth studio album in 2021; however, it was scrapped "halfway through" in 2023 due to dissatisfaction from the band members. The band instead released their second greatest hits album, Rebel Diamonds, in December 2023, which featured three songs from the aborted eighth album: "Boy" and "Your Side of Town", which were both previously issued as singles, as well as the previously unreleased track "Spirit".

== Songs ==
Key
| † | Indicates single release |
| # | Indicates promotional single release |
| ‡ | Indicates songs not written by the Killers |

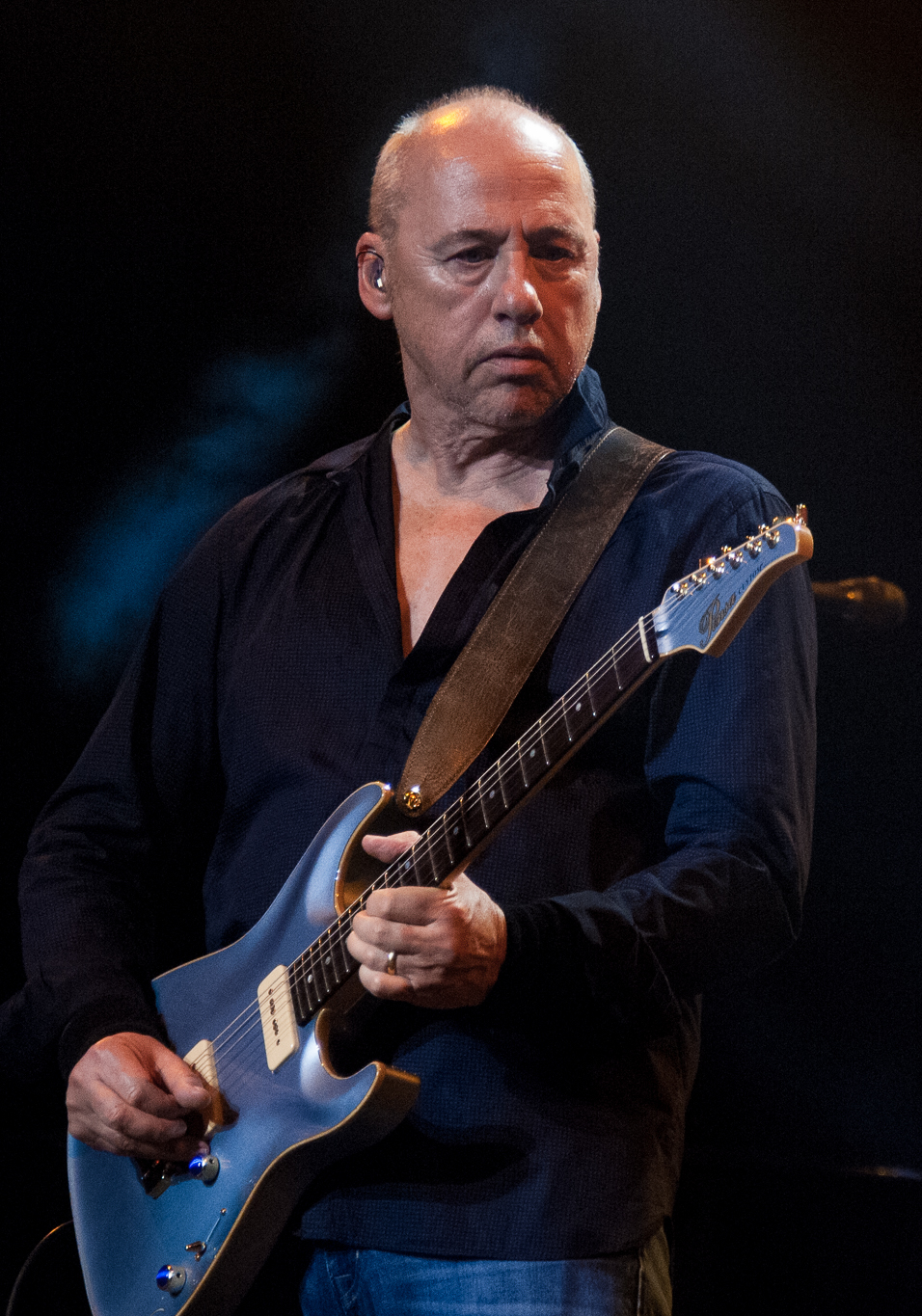
Dire Straits frontman Mark Knopfler contributed guitar to "The Calling" and "Have All The Songs Been Written?" from Wonderful Wonderful (2017). The Killers previously covered Dire Straits's Romeo and Juliet" in 2007.

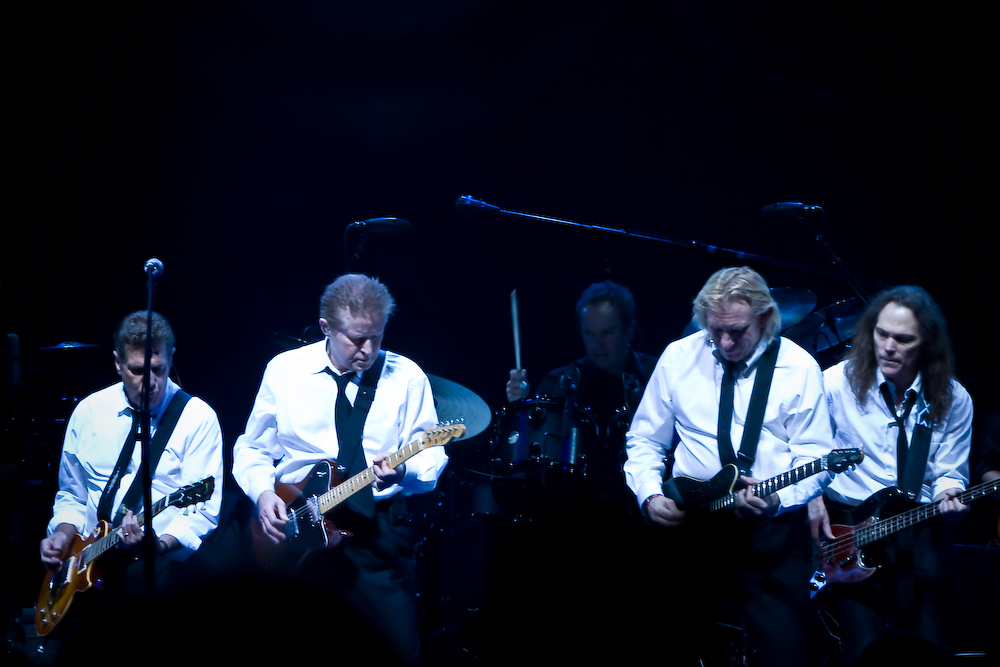
The Killers recorded a cover of the Eagles (pictured in 2008) song, "Hotel California", in 2009.

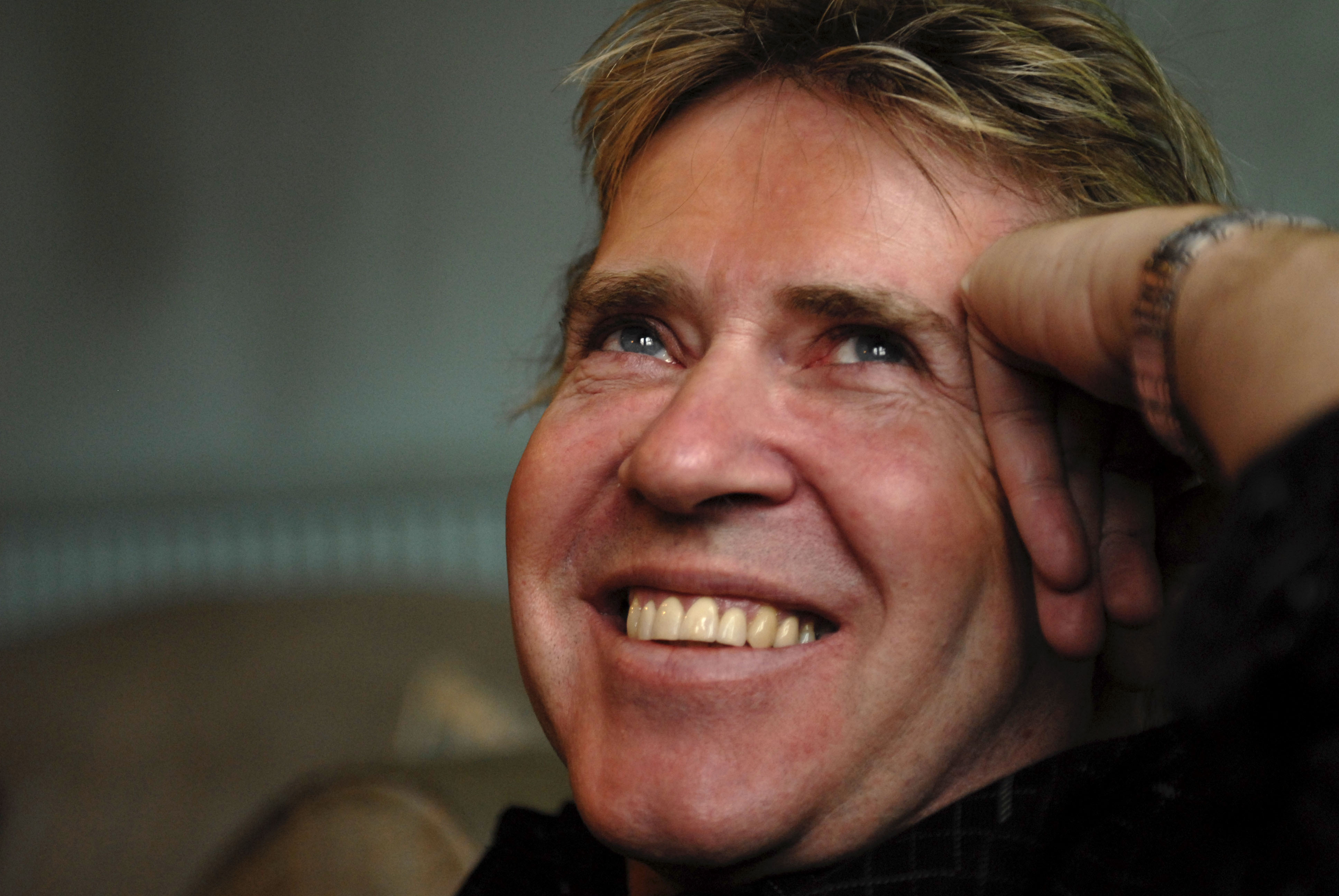
The Killers worked with U2 producer Steve Lillywhite (pictured in 2010) to produce select songs on their fourth studio album, Battle Born (2012).

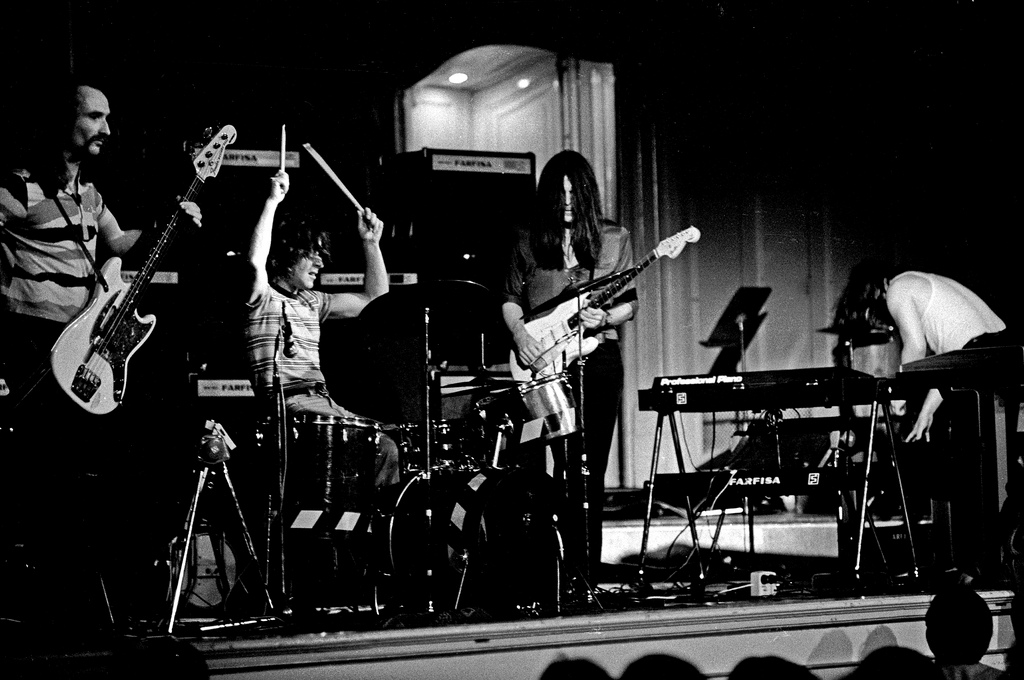
The members of German experimental rock bands Neu! and Can (pictured in 1972) are credited as co-writers on "Dying Breed" from Imploding the Mirage (2020).

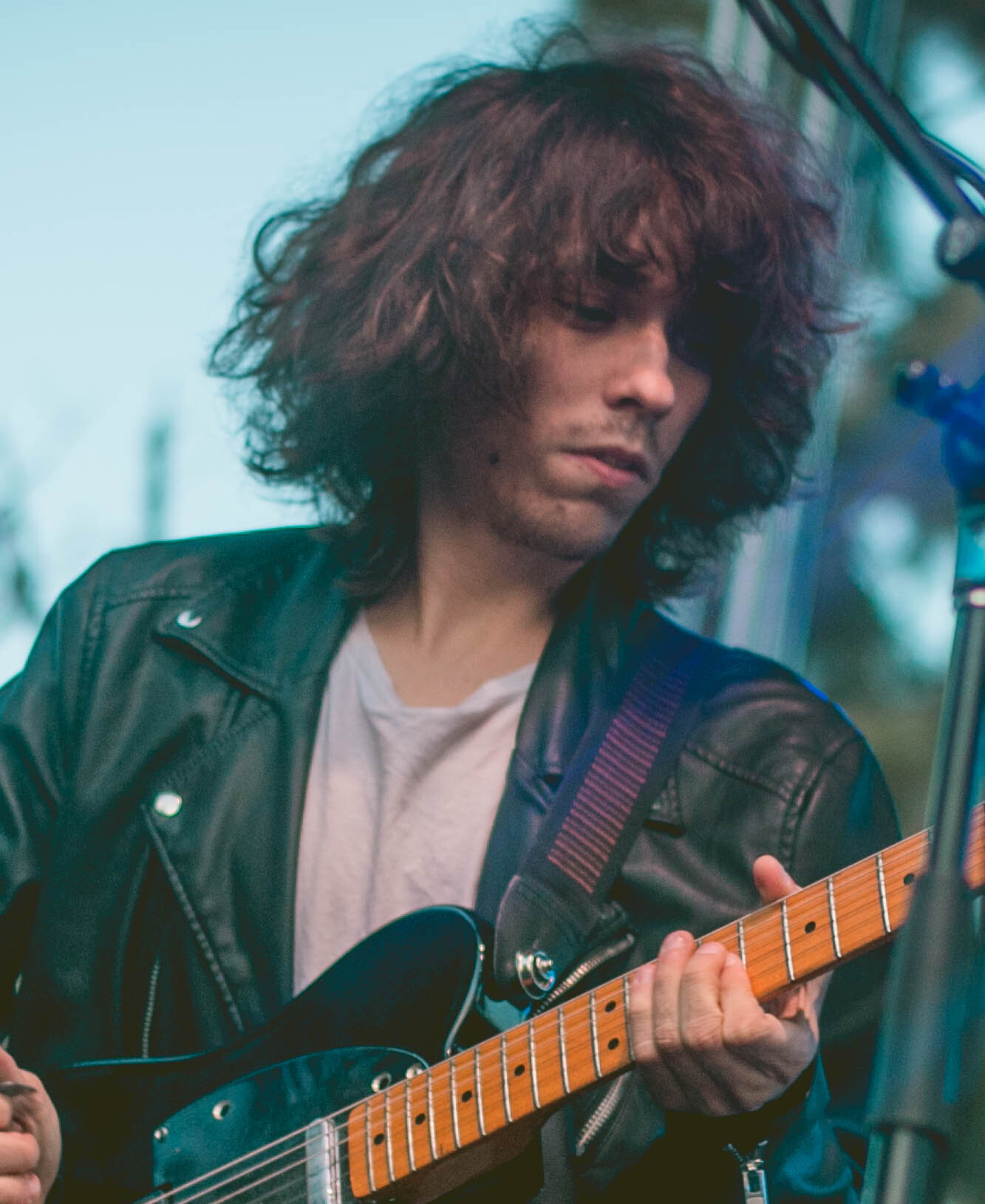
Jonathan Rado (pictured) worked with Shawn Everett (not pictured) to produce the band's sixth and seventh studio albums, Imploding the Mirage (2020) and Pressure Machine (2021), respectively.

| Song | Writer(s) | Original release | Year | Ref(s). |
|---|---|---|---|---|
| "All the Pretty Faces" (Note: Later appeared on Sawdust (2007).) | Flowers, Keuning, Stoermer | B-side to "When You Were Young" | 2006 | |
| "All These Things That I've Done" † | Flowers | Hot Fuss | 2004 | |
| "Andy, You're a Star" | Flowers | Hot Fuss | 2004 | |
| "Badlands" | Bruce Springsteen ‡ | Encore at the Garden | 2025 | |
| "The Ballad of Michael Valentine" | Flowers, Keuning | B-side to "Somebody Told Me" | 2004 | |
| "Battle Born" | The Killers | Battle Born | 2012 | |
| "Be Still" | Flowers, Daniel Lanois | Battle Born | 2012 | |
| "Believe Me Natalie" | Flowers, Vannucci | Hot Fuss | 2004 | |
| "Bling (Confession of a King)" | Flowers, Stoermer | Sam's Town | 2006 | |
| "Blowback" | Flowers, Shawn Everett, Jonathan Rado, Vannucci | Imploding the Mirage | 2020 | |
| "Blowback (acoustic)" | Flowers, Everett, Rado, Vannucci | Imploding the Mirage (deluxe edition) | 2021 | |
| "Bones" † | Flowers, Stoermer, Vannucci | Sam's Town | 2006 | |
| "Boots" (Note: Later appeared on (Red) Christmas EP (2011) and Don't Waste Your Wishes (2016).) † | The Killers | Non-album single | 2010 | |
| "Born to Run" | Springsteen ‡ | Encore at the Garden | 2025 | |
| "Boy" (Note: Later appeared on Rebel Diamonds (2023).) (Note: Stylized in all lowercase.) † | Flowers, Stuart Price | Non-album single | 2022 | |
| "Bright Lights" † | The Killers | Non-album single | 2024 | |
| "C'est La Vie" # | Flowers, Rado, Everett, Alex Cameron, Guy Wood, Robert Mellin, Dino Geangelo, Stoermer | Imploding the Mirage (deluxe edition) | 2021 | |
| "The Calling" | Flowers, Stoermer, Vannucci, Cameron | Wonderful Wonderful | 2017 | |
| "Carry Me Home" | Flowers | Battle Born (deluxe edition) | 2012 | |
| "Caution" † | Flowers, Vannucci, Cameron, Everett, Rado | Imploding the Mirage | 2020 | |
| "Caution (Wasatch Style)" | Flowers, Stoermer, Vannucci, Cameron, Everett, Rado | Imploding the Mirage (deluxe edition) | 2021 | |
| "Change Your Mind" | Flowers, Keuning | Hot Fuss | 2004 | |
| "Christmas in L.A." (featuring Dawes) (Note: Later appeared on Don't Waste Your Wishes (2016).) † | Flowers, Stoermer, Taylor Goldsmith, Irving Berlin | Non-album single | 2013 | |
| "Cody" | Flowers, Vannucci, Rado | Pressure Machine | 2021 | |
| "The Cowboys' Christmas Ball" † | Michael Martin Murphey, William Lawrence Chittenden, the Killers | Non-album single | 2011 | |
| "A Crippling Blow" | The Killers | B-side to "Human" | 2008 | |
| "Daddy's Eyes" | Flowers | B-side to "Bones" | 2006 | |
| "Deadlines and Commitments" | Flowers | Battle Born | 2012 | |
| "Desperate Things" | Flowers, Rado | Pressure Machine | 2021 | |
| "Dirt Sledding" (featuring Ryan Pardey and Richard Dreyfuss) † | The Killers | Non-album single | 2015 | |
| "Don't Shoot Me Santa" (featuring Ryan Pardey) † | The Killers | Non-album single | 2007 | |
| "Dustland" (featuring Bruce Springsteen) | The Killers | Non-album single | 2021 | |
| "A Dustland Fairytale" † | The Killers | Day & Age | 2008 | |
| "Dying Breed" † | Flowers, Rado, Mike Crossey, Cameron, Klause J. Dinger, Michael Rother, Michael Karoli, Jaki Liebezeit, Irmin Schmidt, Holger Schuering, Kenji Suzuki | Imploding the Mirage | 2020 | |
| "Enterlude" | Flowers | Sam's Town | 2006 | |
| "Everything Will Be Alright" | Flowers | Hot Fuss | 2004 | |
| "Exitlude" | Flowers | Sam's Town | 2006 | |
| "Fire in Bone" # | Flowers, Stoermer, Vannucci, Price | Imploding the Mirage | 2020 | |
| "Flesh and Bone" | Flowers, the Killers | Battle Born | 2012 | |
| "For Reasons Unknown" † | Flowers | Sam's Town | 2006 | |
| "Forget About What I Said" | The Killers | B-side to "A Dustland Fairytale" | 2008 | |
| "Four Winds" | Conor Oberst ‡ | B-side to "Spaceman" | 2009 | |
| "From Here on Out" | Flowers | Battle Born | 2012 | |
| "Get Trashed" | Flowers | B-side to "Smile Like You Mean It" | 2005 | |
| "The Getting By" | Flowers, Rado | Pressure Machine | 2021 | |
| "The Getting By II" (featuring Lucius) # | Flowers, Rado | Pressure Machine (deluxe edition) | 2022 | |
| "The Getting By III" | Flowers, Rado | Pressure Machine (deluxe edition) | 2022 | |
| "The Getting By IV" | Flowers, Rado | Pressure Machine (deluxe edition) | 2022 | |
| "The Getting By V" | Flowers, Rado | Pressure Machine (deluxe edition) | 2022 | |
| "Glamorous Indie Rock & Roll" (Note: Later re-recorded for Sawdust (2007).) # | The Killers | Hot Fuss | 2004 | |
| "Goodnight, Travel Well" | The Killers | Day & Age | 2008 | |
| "A Great Big Sled" (featuring Toni Halliday) † | The Killers | Non-album single | 2006 | |
| "¡Happy Birthday Guadalupe!" (featuring Wild Light & Mariachi El Bronx) † | The Killers, Wild Light, Mariachi El Bronx | Non-album single | 2009 | |
| "Have All the Songs Been Written?" | Flowers, Stoermer, Cameron | Wonderful Wonderful | 2017 | |
| "Heart of a Girl" | The Killers, Lanois | Battle Born | 2012 | |
| "Here with Me" † | Flowers, Fran Healy | Battle Born | 2012 | |
| "Hotel California" | Don Felder, Don Henley, Glenn Frey ‡ | Rhythms del Mundo Classics | 2009 | |
| "Human" † | The Killers | Day & Age | 2008 | |
| "I Can't Stay" | The Killers | Day & Age | 2008 | |
| "I Feel It in My Bones" (featuring Ryan Pardey) † | The Killers | Non-album single | 2012 | |
| "I'll Be Home for Christmas" (featuring Ned Humphrey Hansen) † | Walter Kent, Kim Gannon, Buck Ram ‡ | Don't Waste Your Wishes | 2016 | |
| "Imploding the Mirage" | Flowers, Rado | Imploding the Mirage | 2020 | |
| "In Another Life" | Flowers, Rado | Pressure Machine | 2021 | |
| "In The Car Outside" | Flowers, Keuning, Rado | Pressure Machine | 2021 | |
| "Jenny Was a Friend of Mine" | Flowers, Stoermer | Hot Fuss | 2004 | |
| "Joel the Lump of Coal" (featuring Jimmy Kimmel) † | The Killers, Kimmel, Jonathan Bines | Non-album single | 2014 | |
| "Joseph, Better You than Me" (featuring Elton John & Neil Tennant) † | Flowers, John, Tennant | Non-album single | 2008 | |
| "Joy Ride" # | The Killers | Day & Age | 2008 | |
| "Just Another Girl" † | Flowers | Direct Hits | 2013 | |
| "Land of the Free" † | Flowers, Mahalia Jackson | Non-album single | 2019 | |
| "Leave the Bourbon on the Shelf" | Flowers | Sawdust | 2007 | |
| "Life To Come" | Flowers, Stoermer, Vannucci, Cameron, Jacknife Lee, Ryan Tedder | Wonderful Wonderful | 2017 | |
| "Lightning Fields" (featuring k.d. lang) | Flowers, Vanucci, Everett, Rado | Imploding the Mirage | 2020 | |
| "Losing Touch" | The Killers | Day & Age | 2008 | |
| "The Man" † | Flowers, Stoermer, Vannucci, Lee Robert "Kool" Bell, Ronald Bell, Don Boyce, George Brown, Robert Mickens, Otha Nash, Claydes Smith, Dennis Thomas, Richard Westfield | Wonderful Wonderful | 2017 | |
| "A Matter of Time" | The Killers | Battle Born | 2012 | |
| "Midnight Show" | Flowers, Stoermer | Hot Fuss | 2004 | |
| "Miss Atomic Bomb" † | Flowers, Vannucci | Battle Born | 2012 | |
| "Mona Lisas and Mad Hatters" | John, Bernie Taupin ‡ | Revamp & Restoration | 2018 | |
| "Money on Straight" | Flowers, Keuning | Wonderful Wonderful (deluxe edition) | 2017 | |
| "Move Away" | Flowers, Keuning, Stoermer | Spider-Man 3 soundtrack | 2007 | |
| "Mr. Brightside" † | Flowers, Keuning | Hot Fuss | 2003 | |
| "My God" (featuring Weyes Blood) | Flowers, Everett, Blood, Rado | Imploding the Mirage | 2020 | |
| "My List" | Flowers | Sam's Town | 2006 | |
| "My Own Soul's Warning" † | Flowers | Imploding the Mirage | 2020 | |
| "Neon Tiger" | The Killers | Day & Age | 2008 | |
| "On Top" (Note: Later appeared on Hot Fuss (2004).) | The Killers | B-side to "Mr. Brightside" | 2003 | |
| "Out of My Mind" | Flowers, Stoermer, Vannucci, Cameron, Lee, Price | Wonderful Wonderful | 2017 | |
| "Peace of Mind" † | Flowers, Keuning | Sam's Town (10th Anniversary Edition) | 2016 | |
| "Prize Fighter" | Flowers, Vannucci | Battle Born (deluxe edition) | 2012 | |
| "Pressure Machine" | Flowers, Keuning, Rado | Pressure Machine | 2021 | |
| "Questions with the Captain" | The Killers | Sawdust (hidden track) | 2007 | |
| "Quiet Town" # | Flowers, Rado | Pressure Machine | 2021 | |
| "Read My Mind" † | Flowers, Keuning, Stoermer | Sam's Town | 2006 | |
| "The Rising Tide" | Flowers | Battle Born | 2012 | |
| "Romeo and Juliet" # | Mark Knopfler ‡ | B-side to "For Reasons Unknown" | 2007 | |
| "Ruby, Don't Take Your Love to Town" | Mel Tillis ‡ | B-side to "Smile Like You Mean It" | 2005 | |
| "Run for Cover" † | Flowers, Stoermer, Vannucci, Lee, Cameron, Price, Bob Marley | Wonderful Wonderful | 2017 | |
| "Runaway Horses" (featuring Phoebe Bridgers) # | Flowers | Pressure Machine | 2021 | |
| "Runaway Horses II" | Flowers | Pressure Machine (deluxe edition) | 2022 | |
| "Runaways" † | Flowers | Battle Born | 2012 | |
| "Running Towards A Place" | Flowers, Vanucci, Ariel Rechtshaid, Tommy King | Imploding the Mirage | 2020 | |
| "Rut" † | The Killers, Lee | Wonderful Wonderful | 2017 | |
| "Sam's Town" | Flowers | Sam's Town | 2006 | |
| "Sam's Town (Abbey Road Version)" | Flowers | B-side to "For Reasons Unknown" | 2007 | |
| "Shadowplay" † | Bernard Sumner, Peter Hook, Stephen Morris, Ian Curtis ‡ | Control soundtrack | 2007 | |
| "Shot at the Night" † | Flowers | Direct Hits | 2013 | |
| "Show You How" | Flowers | B-side to "Somebody Told Me" | 2005 | |
| "Sleepwalker" | Flowers, Rado | Pressure Machine | 2021 | |
| "Smile Like You Mean It" † | Flowers, Stoermer | B-side to "Mr. Brightside" | 2003 | |
| "Some Kind of Love" # | Flowers, Lee, Brian Eno | Wonderful Wonderful | 2017 | |
| "Somebody Told Me" † | The Killers | Hot Fuss | 2004 | |
| "Spaceman" † | The Killers | Day & Age | 2008 | |
| "Spaceship Adventure" | The Killers | Yo Gabba Gabba! Music Is...AWESOME!Vol. 3 | 2011 | |
| "Spirit" # | Flowers, Price | Rebel Diamonds | 2023 | |
| "Sweet Talk" | The Killers | Sawdust | 2007 | |
| "Terrible Thing" | Flowers | Pressure Machine | 2021 | |
| "This Is Your Life" | The Killers | Day & Age | 2008 | |
| "This River Is Wild" | Flowers, Stoermer | Sam's Town | 2006 | |
| "Tidal Wave" | The Killers | B-side to "Spaceman" | 2008 | |
| "Tranquilize" (featuring Lou Reed) † | Flowers | Sawdust | 2007 | |
| "Tyson vs Douglas" | Flowers, Stoermer, Vannucci, Cameron | Wonderful Wonderful | 2017 | |
| "Ultraviolet (Light My Way)" | U2 ‡ | AHK-toong BAY-bi Covered | 2011 | |
| "Uncle Jonny" | Flowers, Keuning, Stoermer | Sam's Town | 2006 | |
| "Under the Gun" | Flowers, Keuning | B-side to "Somebody Told Me" | 2004 | |
| "The Way It Was" | The Killers, Lanois | Battle Born | 2012 | |
| "West Hills" | Flowers, Rado | Pressure Machine | 2021 | |
| "West Hills II" | Flowers, Rado | Pressure Machine (deluxe edition) | 2022 | |
| "West Hills III" | Flowers, Rado | Pressure Machine (deluxe edition) | 2022 | |
| "When the Dreams Run Dry" | Flowers, Rado, Cameron | Imploding the Mirage | 2020 | |
| "When You Were Young" † | Flowers, Keuning, Stoermer, Vanunucci | Sam's Town | 2006 | |
| "Where the White Boys Dance" | Flowers, Keuning, Stoermer | B-side to "When You Were Young" | 2006 | |
| "A White Demon Love Song" | The Killers | The Twilight Saga: New Moon soundtrack | 2009 | |
| "Who Let You Go?" | The Killers | B-side to "Mr. Brightside" | 2003 | |
| "Why Do I Keep Counting?" | Flowers | Sam's Town | 2006 | |
| "Why Don't You Find Out for Yourself" | Morrissey, Alain Whyte ‡ | B-side to "All These Things That I've Done" | 2004 | |
| "Wonderful Wonderful" # | Flowers, Stoermer, Vannucci, Lee | Wonderful Wonderful | 2017 | |
| "The World We Live In" † | The Killers | Day & Age | 2008 | |
| "Your Side of Town" † | Flowers, Price | Non-album single | 2023 | |

== Unreleased songs ==
| Song | Notes | Ref(s). |
|---|---|---|
| "007" | Performed live in 2002. Described as a "moody instrumental". | |
| "Amen" | A whiteboard containing the title of the song was posted on social media in April 2019 during sessions for Imploding the Mirage (2020). | |
| "Beg Your Pardon" | Recorded at engineer Scott Bray's home studio in May 2002. | |
| "Boom Town" | A whiteboard containing the title of the song was posted on social media in April 2019 during sessions for Imploding the Mirage (2020). | |
| "Diamonds on Black Velvet" | First teased by Flowers and Vannucci during an Instagram Live in 2020, during sessions for Pressure Machine (2021). The song ended up being ommitted, but was performed live on Flowers' Thrasher Tour in 2026. | |
| "Desperate" | Recorded in the fall of 2001. Appeared on an early demo CD in 2002. | |
| "Faith in Me" | A whiteboard containing the title of the song was posted on social media in April 2019 during sessions for Imploding the Mirage (2020). | |
| "The Future" | Performed a handful of times in 2002. Described as "almost Iggy Pop-y". | |
| "Hear Me Out" | A whiteboard containing the title of the song was posted on social media in April 2019 during sessions for Imploding the Mirage (2020). | |
| "Heart Beat" | A whiteboard containing the title of the song was posted on social media in April 2019 during sessions for Imploding the Mirage (2020). | |
| "Hot Pink" | A whiteboard containing the title of the song was posted on social media in April 2019 during sessions for Imploding the Mirage (2020). | |
| "Humor Me" | Perfromed live in 2002. Described as "Lennonesque" and "Keuning's favorite among the early material". | |
| "I Think I'm Falling Apart" | Performed live in 2002. Described as "a synthy ballad". | |
| "It's Crashing" | A whiteboard containing the title of the song was posted on social media in April 2019 during sessions for Imploding the Mirage (2020). | |
| "I'm Talking to You" | Slated for inclusion on Sam's Town (2006), but didn't make the final cut. Described by Flowers as "our Oasis rip-off song". | |
| "I've Got This Feeling" | Performed live in 2002. Described as "propulsive". | |
| "Just Can't Quit" | A whiteboard containing the title of the song was posted on social media in October 2019 during sessions for Imploding the Mirage (2020). | |
| "Long Hand Look" | A whiteboard containing the title of the song was posted on social media in April 2019 during sessions for Imploding the Mirage (2020). | |
| "Man + Woman" | A whiteboard containing the title of the song was posted on social media in October 2019 during sessions for Imploding the Mirage (2020). Later appeared on a list posted in December as "Man and Woman Enough". | |
| "The Moment" | A whiteboard containing the title of the song was posted on social media in April 2019 during sessions for Imploding the Mirage (2020). | |
| "Newsman" | Also known as "Get My Shit Together". Performed a handful of times in 2002. Described as "almost Iggy Pop-y". | |
| "O, Sad American Night" | Written and recorded during sessions for Day & Age (2008). Described by Flowers as a "cataclyst" to his debut solo album, Flamingo (2010). Leaked online in 2013. | |
| "One in a Million" | A whiteboard containing the title of the song was posted on social media in April 2019 during sessions for Imploding the Mirage (2020). | |
| "Party People" | A whiteboard containing the title of the song was posted on social media in October 2019 during sessions for Imploding the Mirage (2020). | |
| "Replaceable" | Recorded in the fall of 2001. Appeared on an early demo CD in 2002. | |
| "The Slot Tech" | Written during sessions for Battle Born (2012). Described as a "seven-and-a-half-minute rock epic" about a "slot technician with a gambling problem". Mentioned again by Flowers in interviews in 2021, saying: "One day you will hear it." The song has not been released thus far. | |
| "Status Quo" | A whiteboard containing the title of the song was posted on social media in April 2019 during sessions for Imploding the Mirage (2020). | |
| "Stereo of Lies" | Written about former drummer Matt Norcross trying to sue the Killers in 2005 over songwriting credit on an early demo of "Mr. Brightside". Performed live throughout 2005, but never publicly released. Norcross later denied the lawsuit in 2010. | |
| "A Stupid Prize" | A whiteboard containing the title of the song was posted on social media in April 2019 during sessions for Imploding the Mirage (2020). | |
| "Spirit of Mystery" | A whiteboard containing the title of the song was posted on social media in October 2019 during sessions for Imploding the Mirage (2020). | |
| "Tiny Techno Tease" | Recorded at engineer Scott Bray's home studio in May 2002. | |
| "Waiting for Love" | Recorded and appeared on an early demo CD in 2002. Described by Keuning as "really sloppily done". | |
| "We Did It in the Name of Love" | Published exclusively to social media on Christmas Day 2023, from the band's scrapped eighth studio album. Never had a proper release. | |
| "Where is She (Soft Surrender)" | Written about Scottish murder victim Jodi Jones. Performed live throughout 2005, but never officially released due to public backlash. | |
| "Wild Grass" | A whiteboard containing the title of the song was posted on social media in April 2019 during sessions for Imploding the Mirage (2020). | |
