= The Killers discography =

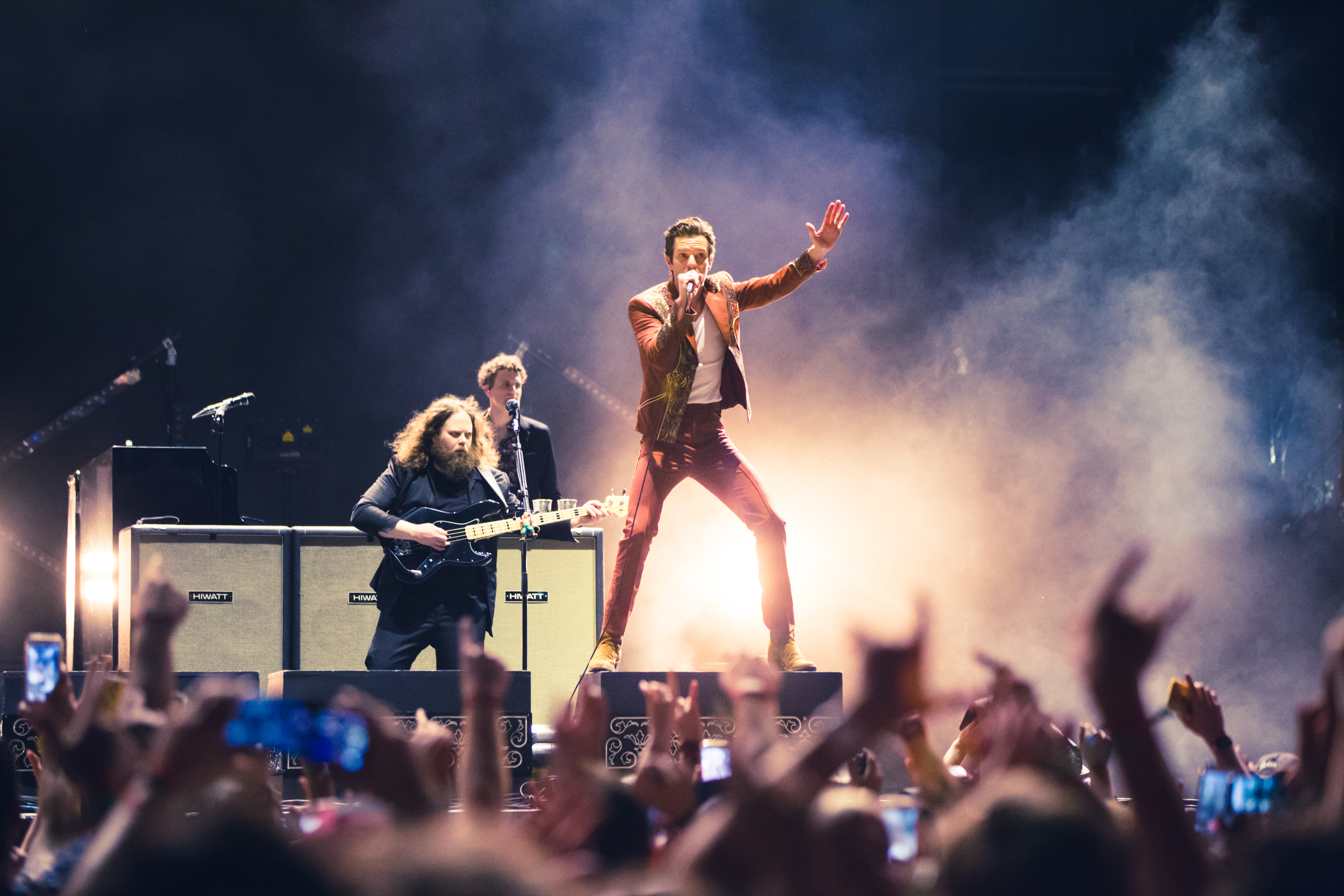
- The Killers performing during the Wonderful Wonderful World Tour in 2018
- Studio albums: 7
- Extended plays: 2
- Live albums: 1
- Compilation albums: 4
- Singles: 42
- Promotional singles: 11
- Video albums: 1
- Music videos: 48

American rock band the Killers have released seven studio albums, one live album, four compilation albums, two extended plays, 42 singles, 11 promotional singles, and 48 music videos. Part of the post-punk revival movement, the Killers are influenced by music styles of the 1980s and 1990s. The band has sold over 28 million records worldwide. The group's debut album, Hot Fuss (2004), brought the band mainstream success, spawning four UK top-20 singles, including "Mr. Brightside". The album has since been certified six-times platinum by the Recording Industry Association of America (RIAA) and eight-times platinum by the British Phonographic Industry (BPI), selling seven million copies worldwide.

The Killers' second studio album, Sam's Town, was released in October 2006, being met initially by mixed reviews but nonetheless proving a commercial success, debuting at number two on the Billboard 200 with opening sales of 315,000 units, and going on to be certified double-platinum by the RIAA. In the UK, the album debuted atop the chart and went on to be certified five-times platinum by the BPI. The compilation album Sawdust was released in November 2007, containing B-sides, rarities, and new material.

The band's third album, Day & Age, produced by Stuart Price, was released in November 2008 and spawned the commercially successful single "Human", described by Brandon Flowers as "our biggest song, pound for pound". Day & Age proved a commercial success in Europe, and was certified platinum by the RIAA. Their fourth album, Battle Born, was released in September 2012, becoming the band's fourth consecutive album to reach number one in both the UK and Ireland.

In November 2013, in celebration of their first decade together, the band released their first greatest hits album, titled Direct Hits, a contractual requirement with their record label. The compilation features two new tracks, including "Shot at the Night", produced by Anthony Gonzalez of M83. In September 2017, the Killers released their fifth studio album, Wonderful Wonderful, becoming the band's fifth consecutive album to top the UK Albums Chart, as well as their first number-one album on the US Billboard 200. In August 2020, the band released their sixth studio album, Imploding the Mirage, becoming the band's sixth consecutive album to top the UK Albums Chart and their highest rated by critics in the aggregate.

In August 2021, the band released their seventh studio album, Pressure Machine, and have begun work on recording an eighth. In 2023, Flowers revealed that the album has been scrapped, citing dissatisfaction with its direction. In December of that year, the band released their second greatest hits compilation, Rebel Diamonds, featuring three songs that would have appeared on the aborted album; one of these songs, "Boy", became their longest-running number-one song on the Alternative Airplay charts in the US. A fourth song from these sessions, "We Did It in the Name of Love", was released only to social media in December 2023.

== Albums ==
=== Studio albums ===
List of studio albums, with selected chart positions, sales figures and certifications
Title	Details	Peak chart positions										Sales	Certifications
Title	Details	US	AUS	BEL (FL)	CAN	GER	IRL	NLD	NZ	SWI	UK	Sales	Certifications
Hot Fuss	Released: June 15, 2004; Label: Island; Formats: CD, LP, digital download, streaming	7	1	95	4	75	1	46	5	48	1	US: 3,750,000 (Note: Sales as of January 2017); UK: 2,370,000 (Note: Sales as of August 2021)	RIAA: 6× Platinum; ARIA: 6× Platinum; BPI: 8× Platinum; BRMA: Gold; BVMI: Gold; MC: 8× Platinum; RMNZ: 4× Platinum
Sam's Town	Released: October 3, 2006; Label: Island; Formats: CD, LP, digital download, streaming	2	2	13	1	6	1	14	1	9	1	US: 1,300,000 (Note: Sales as of July 2008); UK: 1,580,000 (Note: Sales as of August 2021)	RIAA: 2× Platinum; ARIA: 3× Platinum; BPI: 5× Platinum; BRMA: Gold; BVMI: Gold; IRMA: 4× Platinum; MC: 3× Platinum; RMNZ: 2× Platinum
Day & Age	Released: November 18, 2008; Label: Island; Formats: CD, LP, digital download, streaming	6	4	12	6	8	1	12	2	4	1	US: 774,000 (Note: Sales as of July 2012); UK: 1,320,000 (Note: Sales as of August 2021)	RIAA: Platinum; ARIA: Platinum; BPI: 4× Platinum; BVMI: Platinum; IFPI SWI: Gold; IRMA: 4× Platinum; MC: Platinum; RMNZ: Platinum
Battle Born	Released: September 18, 2012; Label: Island; Formats: CD, LP, digital download, streaming	3	2	6	3	2	1	7	2	2	1	US: 344,158 (Note: Sales as of September 2014); UK: 378,000 (Note: Sales as of August 2021)	ARIA: Gold; BPI: Platinum; IRMA: Gold; MC: Gold
Wonderful Wonderful	Released: September 22, 2017; Label: Island; Formats: CD, LP, digital download, streaming	1	1	7	4	8	2	12	3	8	1	UK: 188,000 (Note: Sales as of August 2021)	BPI: Gold
Imploding the Mirage	Released: August 21, 2020; Label: Island; Formats: CD, LP, cassette, digital download, streaming	8	1	4	9	6	1	16	4	2	1	UK: 100,000 (Note: Sales as of August 2021)	BPI: Gold
Pressure Machine	Released: August 13, 2021; Label: Island, EMI; Formats: CD, LP, cassette, digital download, streaming	9	6	8	31	7	6	17	18	4	1		
"—" denotes a recording that did not chart or was not released in that territory.

=== Live albums ===
List of live albums, with selected chart positions
Title	Details	Peak chart positions			
Title	Details	GER	MEX	NLD	SPA
Live from the Royal Albert Hall	Released: November 6, 2009; Label: Island; Formats: DVD+CD, Blu-ray	60	5	35	42

=== Compilation albums ===
List of compilation albums, with selected chart positions, sales figures and certifications
Title	Details	Peak chart positions										Sales	Certifications
Title	Details	US	AUS	BEL (FL)	CAN	GER	IRL	NLD	NZ	SWI	UK	Sales	Certifications
Sawdust	Released: November 9, 2007; Label: Island; Formats: CD, LP, digital download, streaming	12	6	66	10	53	13	72	18	33	7	UK: 497,000 (Note: Sales as of August 2021)	ARIA: Gold; BPI: Platinum; IRMA: Platinum; MC: Gold
Direct Hits	Released: November 11, 2013; Label: Island; Formats: CD, LP, digital download, streaming	20	10	18	25	63	5	40	—	57	5	UK: 825,500 (Note: Sales as of August 2021)	ARIA: Gold; BPI: 3× Platinum; RMNZ: Gold
Don't Waste Your Wishes	Released: November 18, 2016; Label: Island; Formats: CD, digital download, streaming	—	—	—	—	—	—	—	—	—	— (Note: Don't Waste Your Wishes did not enter the UK Albums Chart, but peaked at number 75 on the UK Album Downloads Chart.)		
Rebel Diamonds	Released: December 8, 2023; Label: Island, EMI; Formats: CD, LP, digital download, streaming	74	31	91	70	97	1	—	16	—	1		BPI: Platinum; RMNZ: 2× Platinum
"—" denotes a recording that did not chart or was not released in that territory.

== Extended plays ==
List of extended plays, with selected chart positions
Title	Details	Peak chart positions		
Title	Details	US	AUS	UK
(Red) Christmas EP	Released: November 29, 2011; Label: Island; Formats: Digital download, streaming	85	77	104
Encore at the Garden (with Bruce Springsteen)	Released: April 12, 2025; Label: Island; Formats: 12", digital download, streaming	—	—	— (Note: The Killers & Bruce Springsteen Encore At The Garden did not enter the UK Albums Chart, but peaked at number three on the UK Singles Sales Chart.)
"—" denotes a recording that did not chart or was not released in that territory.

== Singles ==
=== 2000s ===
List of singles released in the 2000s decade, with selected chart positions and certifications, showing year released and album name
Title	Year	Peak chart positions										Certifications	Album
Title	Year	US	US Alt.	AUS	AUT	CAN	GER	IRL	NLD	NZ	UK	Certifications	Album
"Mr. Brightside"	2003	10	3	19	3	—	14	42	66	15	10	RIAA: Diamond; ARIA: 25× Platinum; BPI: 12× Platinum; BVMI: 3× Platinum; MC: Diamond; RMNZ: 13× Platinum	Hot Fuss
"Somebody Told Me"	2004	51	3	17	—	— (Note: "Somebody Told Me" did not enter the Billboard Canadian Hot 100, but peaked at number eight on the Canadian Airplay chart.)	—	9	41	13	3	RIAA: 5× Platinum; ARIA: 7× Platinum; BPI: 4× Platinum; BVMI: Gold; MC: 5× Platinum; RMNZ: 3× Platinum	Hot Fuss
"All These Things That I've Done"	2004	74	10	42	—	— (Note: "All These Things That I've Done" did not enter the Canadian Singles Chart, but peaked at number 52 on the Canadian Digital Songs chart.)	—	46	66	36	18	RIAA: 3× Platinum; ARIA: 2× Platinum; BPI: 2× Platinum; MC: 3× Platinum; RMNZ: Platinum	Hot Fuss
"Smile Like You Mean It"	2005	—	15	47	—	—	—	20	—	—	11	RIAA: Platinum; ARIA: Platinum; BPI: Platinum; MC: Gold; RMNZ: Gold	Hot Fuss
"When You Were Young"	2006	14	1	10	—	5	44	6	71	10	2	RIAA: 5× Platinum; ARIA: 6× Platinum; BPI: 3× Platinum; MC: 4× Platinum; RMNZ: 2× Platinum	Sam's Town
"Bones"	2006	—	21	22	—	—	88	24	—	16	15	ARIA: Gold	Sam's Town
"A Great Big Sled" (Note: These songs were originally released as non-album singles. However, they were later included on 2011's (Red) Christmas EP and 2016's Don't Waste Your Wishes.) (featuring Toni Halliday)	2006	54	—	—	—	— (Note: "A Great Big Sled" did not enter the Canadian Singles Chart, but peaked at number seven on the Canadian Digital Songs chart.)	—	—	—	—	— (Note: "A Great Big Sled" reached number 11 on the UK Singles Downloads Chart, but was ineligible for the main chart due to chart rules at the time not allowing download-only songs to chart.)		Non-album single
"Read My Mind"	2007	62	8	32	56	39	60	18	95	20	15	RIAA: Platinum; ARIA: Platinum; BPI: Platinum; MC: Platinum; RMNZ: Gold	Sam's Town
"For Reasons Unknown"	2007	—	—	—	—	—	—	—	—	—	53	BPI: Silver	Sam's Town
"Shadowplay"	2007	68	19	—	—	49	—	—	—	—	115		Sawdust
"Tranquilize" (featuring Lou Reed)	2007	—	—	84	57	59	—	—	—	—	13		Sawdust
"Don't Shoot Me Santa"	2007	— (Note: "Don't Shoot Me Santa" did not enter the Billboard Hot 100, but peaked at number eight on the Bubbling Under Hot 100 Singles chart.)	—	—	—	23	—	49	—	—	34		Non-album single
"Human"	2008	32	6	28	6	9	4	4	6	17	3	RIAA: 2× Platinum; ARIA: 3× Platinum; BPI: 3× Platinum; BVMI: Platinum; MC: 2× Platinum; RMNZ: 2× Platinum	Day & Age
"Spaceman"	2008	67	8	62	44	47	29	33	57	—	40	RIAA: Gold; ARIA: Platinum; BPI: Gold; MC: Gold	Day & Age
"Joseph, Better You than Me" (featuring Elton John and Neil Tennant)	2008	—	—	—	64	43	—	—	—	—	88		Non-album single
"The World We Live In"	2009	—	—	— (Note: "The World We Live In" did not enter the Australian ARIA Singles Chart but peaked at number 14 on the ARIA Hitseekers Chart.)	—	—	—	—	42	—	82		Day & Age
"A Dustland Fairytale"	2009	—	36	—	—	—	—	—	—	—	158		Day & Age
"¡Happy Birthday Guadalupe!" (featuring Wild Light and Mariachi El Bronx)	2009	— (Note: "¡Happy Birthday Guadalupe!" did not enter the Billboard Hot 100, but peaked at number 10 on the Hot Singles Sales chart.)	—	—	—	—	98	—	—	—	110		Non-album single
"—" denotes a single that did not chart or was not released in that territory.

=== 2010s ===
List of singles released in the 2010s decade, with selected chart positions and certifications, showing year released and album name
Title	Year	Peak chart positions										Certifications	Album
Title	Year	US	US Rock	AUS	CAN	GER	IRL	JPN	NLD	SCO	UK	Certifications	Album
"Boots"	2010	79	— (Note: "Boots" did not enter the Hot Rock Songs chart, but peaked at number 38 on the Rock Digital Songs.)	—	73	—	—	—	85	37	53		Non-album single
"The Cowboys' Christmas Ball"	2011	—	— (Note: "The Cowboys' Christmas Ball" did not enter the Hot Rock & Alternative Songs chart, but peaked at number 12 on the Alternative Digital Songs chart.)	—	—	—	—	—	—	93	112		(Red) Christmas EP
"Runaways"	2012	78	13	67	37	44	13	37	64	13	18	RIAA: Gold; ARIA: Platinum; BPI: Silver; MC: Gold	Battle Born
"Miss Atomic Bomb"	2012	—	— (Note: "Miss Atomic Bomb" did not enter the Hot Rock & Alternative Songs chart, but peaked at number 35 on the Rock & Alternative Airplay chart.)	—	—	—	—	—	—	—	—		Battle Born
"I Feel It in My Bones" (Note: These songs were originally released as non-album singles. However, they were later included on 2016's Don't Waste Your Wishes.)	2012	—	41	—	—	—	—	—	—	60	70		Non-album single
"Here with Me"	2012	— (Note: "Here with Me" did not enter the Billboard Hot 100, but peaked at number 19 on the Bubbling Under Hot 100 Singles chart.)	18	—	88	—	—	—	—	—	—		Battle Born
"Shot at the Night"	2013	—	22	—	90	—	33	—	—	19	23	RIAA: Gold; ARIA: Gold; BPI: Silver; MC: Gold	Direct Hits
"Just Another Girl"	2013	—	50	—	—	—	85	—	—	72	83		Direct Hits
"Christmas in L.A." (featuring Dawes)	2013	—	43	—	—	—	100	—	—	85	92		Non-album singles
"Joel the Lump of Coal" (featuring Jimmy Kimmel)	2014	—	27	—	—	—	—	—	—	78	160		Non-album singles
"Dirt Sledding" (featuring Ryan Pardey and Richard Dreyfuss)	2015	—	— (Note: "Dirt Sledding" did not enter the Hot Rock & Alternative Songs chart, but peaked at number 21 on the Alternative Digital Songs chart.)	—	—	—	—	—	—	—	—		Non-album singles
"Peace of Mind"	2016	—	39	—	—	—	—	—	—	—	—		Sam's Town (10th Anniversary Edition)
"The Man"	2017	—	5	65	—	—	—	—	— (Note: "The Man" did not enter the Netherlands' Single Top 100, but peaked at number 24 on the Netherlands' Single Tip Chart.)	38	63	RIAA: Platinum; ARIA: 2× Platinum; BPI: Platinum; MC: Platinum; RMNZ: Gold	Wonderful Wonderful
"Run for Cover"	2017	—	19	—	—	—	—	—	—	93	100	ARIA: Gold; BPI: Silver; MC: Gold	Wonderful Wonderful
"Rut"	2018	—	—	—	—	—	—	—	—	—	—		Wonderful Wonderful
"Land of the Free"	2019	—	25	—	—	—	—	—	—	83	— (Note: "Land of the Free" did not enter the UK Singles Chart, but peaked at number 88 on the UK Singles Sales Chart.)		Non-album single
"—" denotes a single that did not chart or was not released in that territory.

=== 2020s ===
List of singles released in the 2020s decade, with selected chart positions and certifications, showing year released and album name
Title	Year	Peak chart positions										Certifications	Album
Title	Year	US Digi.	US Rock	AUS Digi.	CAN Digi.	GER Digi.	MEX	SCO	NLD Air.	NZ Hot	UK	Certifications	Album
"Caution"	2020	19	3	8	42	—	17	13	—	28	95	ARIA: Gold; BPI: Silver	Imploding the Mirage
"My Own Soul's Warning"	2020	—	19	—	—	—	—	23	—	23	84		Imploding the Mirage
"Dying Breed"	2020	—	— (Note: "Dying Breed" did not enter the Hot Rock & Alternative Songs chart, but peaked at number 15 on the Alternative Digital Songs chart.)	—	—	—	—	47	—	28	— (Note: "Dying Breed" did not enter the UK Singles Chart, but peaked at number 60 on the UK Singles Sales Chart.)		Imploding the Mirage
"Dustland" (featuring Bruce Springsteen)	2021	47	44	34	—	—	—	—	—	37	— (Note: "Dustland" did not enter the UK Singles Chart, but peaked at number 22 on the UK Singles Sales Chart.)		Non-album single
"Boy"	2022	—	17	—	—	76	26	—	—	34	— (Note: "Boy" did not enter the UK Singles Chart, but peaked at number 16 on the UK Singles Sales Chart.)		Rebel Diamonds
"Your Side of Town"	2023	—	42	36	—	80	—	—	—	31	— (Note: "Your Side of Town" did not enter the UK Singles Chart, but peaked at number 17 on the UK Singles Sales Chart.)		Rebel Diamonds
"Bright Lights"	2024	—	— (Note: "Bright Lights" did not enter the Hot Rock & Alternative Songs chart, but peaked at number 48 on the Rock & Alternative Airplay chart.)	42	—	48	—	—	32	35	— (Note: "Bright Lights" did not enter the UK Singles Chart, but peaked at number 13 on the UK Singles Sales Chart.)		Non-album single
"—" denotes a single that did not chart or was not released in that territory.

=== Promotional singles ===
List of promotional singles, with selected chart positions and certifications, showing year released and album name
Title	Year	Peak chart positions										Certifications	Album
Title	Year	US Bub.	US Pop	US Rock	AUS	ICE	MEX Eng.	NZ Hot	SCO	SWI Air	UK	Certifications	Album
"Glamorous Indie Rock & Roll"	2004	13	71	—	—	—	—	—	—	—	—	BPI: Silver	Hot Fuss
"Romeo and Juliet"	2007	—	—	—	98	—	—	—	—	—	86		Sawdust
"Joy Ride"	2008	—	—	—	—	—	—	—	—	84	—		Day & Age
"Wonderful Wonderful"	2017	—	—	50	—	—	—	—	—	—	—		Wonderful Wonderful
"Some Kind of Love"	2017	—	—	38	—	—	—	—	—	—	—		Wonderful Wonderful
"Fire in Bone"	2020	—	—	27	—	—	—	—	58	—	— (Note: "Fire in Bone" did not enter the UK Singles Chart, but peaked at number 77 on the UK Singles Sales Chart.)		Imploding the Mirage
"C'est La Vie"	2021	—	—	— (Note: "C'est La Vie" did not enter the Hot Rock Songs chart, but peaked at number 18 on the Triple A Airplay chart.)	—	—	—	—	—	—	—		Imploding the Mirage
"Quiet Town"	2021	—	—	— (Note: "Quiet Town" did not enter the Hot Rock Songs chart, but peaked at number 40 on the Rock & Alternative Airplay chart.)	—	23	—	—	—	81	— (Note: "Quiet Town" did not enter the UK Singles Chart, but peaked at number 65 on the UK Singles Sales Chart.)		Pressure Machine
"Runaway Horses" (featuring Phoebe Bridgers)	2021	—	—	—	—	—	—	—	—	—	—		Pressure Machine
"The Getting By II" (featuring Lucius)	2022	—	—	—	—	—	30	—	—	—	—		Pressure Machine (Deluxe)
"Spirit"	2023	—	—	—	—	—	—	37	—	—	— (Note: "Spirit" did not enter the UK Singles Chart, but peaked at number 94 on the UK Singles Sales Chart.)		Rebel Diamonds
"—" denotes a single that did not chart or was not released in that territory.

== Other charted and certified songs ==
List of other charted songs, with selected chart positions and certifications, showing year released and album name
Title	Year	Peak chart positions										Certifications	Album
Title	Year	US Bub.	US Pop	US Rock	BEL (FL) Tip	BEL (WA) Tip	CIS	MEX Eng.	NZ Hot	RUS	UK	Certifications	Album
"Jenny Was a Friend of Mine"	2004	—	—	—	—	—	—	—	—	—	—	RIAA: Gold; ARIA: Gold; BPI: Silver; MC: Gold	Hot Fuss
"Under the Gun"	2005	—	83	—	—	—	—	—	—	—	—		"Somebody Told Me" single, Sawdust
"All the Pretty Faces"	2006	—	—	—	—	—	—	—	—	—	— (Note: "All the Pretty Faces" did not enter the UK Singles Chart, but peaked at number 92 on the UK Singles Downloads Chart.)		"When You Were Young" single, Sawdust
"Read My Mind" (Pet Shop Boys Remix)	2007	—	—	—	—	—	139	—	—	136	—		"Read My Mind" single
"Human" (Live)	2009	—	—	—	—	—	—	36	—	—	—		Live from the Royal Albert Hall
"Flesh and Bone"	2012	17	—	— (Note: "Flesh and Bone" did not enter the Hot Rock Songs chart, but peaked at number 38 on the Rock Digital Songs.)	—	—	—	—	—	—	184		Battle Born
"Tyson vs Douglas"	2017	—	—	—	39	42	—	—	—	—	—		Wonderful Wonderful
"Blowback"	2020	—	—	41	19	41	—	—	21	—	—		Imploding the Mirage
"—" denotes a song that did not chart or was not released in that territory.

== Guest appearances ==
List of non-single guest appearances, showing year released and album name
Title	Year	Album
"Move Away"	2007	Music from and Inspired by Spider-Man 3
"Read My Mind (Gabriel & Dresden Unplugged Mix)"	2007	Toolroom Knights
"Shadowplay"	2007	Music From The Motion Picture Control
"Hotel California"	2009	Rhythms del Mundo Classics
"A White Demon Love Song"	2009	The Twilight Saga: New Moon (Original Motion Picture Soundtrack)
"Spaceship Adventure"	2011	Yo Gabba Gabba! Music Is... Awesome! Vol. 3
"Ultraviolet (Light My Way)"	2011	AHK-toong BAY-bi Covered
"All These Things That I've Done" (live)	2012	This Is BBC Radio 6 Music Live
"Mr. Brightside" (Beatman & Ludmilla vs. The Killers)	2016	Bittersweet
"Mona Lisas and Mad Hatters"	2018	Revamp: Reimagining the Songs of Elton John & Bernie Taupin
"Somebody Told Me" (live)	2019	BBC Radio 1's Live Lounge: The Collection
"Smile Like You Mean It" (live)	2019	BBC Radio 1's Live Lounge: The Collection

== Videography ==
=== Video albums ===
List of video albums, with selected chart positions and certifications
Title	Details	Peak chart positions									Certifications
Title	Details	US DVD	AUS DVD	AUT DVD	BEL (FL) DVD	BEL (WA) DVD	IRL DVD	POR DVD	SWI DVD	UK DVD	Certifications
Live from the Royal Albert Hall	Released: November 9, 2009; Label: Island; Formats: DVD+CD, Blu-ray	1	5	4	3	4	4	4	2	12	RIAA: Platinum; ARIA: Platinum; BPI: 2× Platinum; IRMA: Gold

=== Music videos ===
List of music videos, showing year released and directors
Title	Year	Director(s)
"Somebody Told Me"	2004	Brett Simon
"Mr. Brightside" (UK version)	2004	Brian and Brad Palmer
"All These Things That I've Done" (UK version)	2004	Alexander Hemming and Kristy Gunn
"Mr. Brightside" (US version)	2004	Sophie Muller
"Smile Like You Mean It"	2005	Chris Hopewell
"All These Things That I've Done" (US version)	2005	Anton Corbijn
"When You Were Young"	2006	Anthony Mandler
"Bones"	2006	Tim Burton
"A Great Big Sled" (featuring Toni Halliday)	2006	Stephen Penta
"Read My Mind"	2007	Diane Martel
"For Reasons Unknown"	2007	Diane Martel
"Tranquilize" (featuring Lou Reed)	2007	Anthony Mandler
"Shadowplay"	2007	Spencer Kaplan and Jonathan V. Sela
"Don't Shoot Me Santa"	2007	Matthew Gray Gubler
"Human"	2008	Daniel Drysdale
"Joseph, Better You than Me"	2008	Daniel Drysdale and Tyler Trautman
"Spaceman"	2009	Ray Tintori
"The World We Live In"	2009	Danny Drysdale
"A Dustland Fairytale"	2009	Anthony Mandler
"Goodnight, Travel Well"	2009	David Slade
"¡Happy Birthday Guadalupe!"	2009	Chris Callister
"Boots"	2010	Jared Hess
"The Cowboys' Christmas Ball"	2011	Roboshobo
"Runaways"	2012	Warren Fu
"Miss Atomic Bomb" (tour video)	2012	Giorgio Testi
"I Feel It in My Bones"	2012	Roboshobo
"Miss Atomic Bomb"	2012	Warren Fu
"Here with Me"	2012	Tim Burton
"Shot at the Night"	2013	Roboshobo
"Just Another Girl"	2013	Warren Fu
"Christmas in L.A." (featuring Dawes)	2013	Kelly Loosli
"Joel the Lump of Coal" (featuring Jimmy Kimmel)	2014	Jonathan Kimmel
"Dirt Sledding" (featuring Ryan Pardey and Richard Dreyfuss)	2015	Matthew Gray Gubler
"The Man"	2017	Tim Mattia
"Run for Cover"	2017	Tarik Mikou and Eric Morin
"Rut"	2018	Danny Drysdale
"Wonderful Wonderful" (lyric video)	2018	Caitlyn Cutler
"Land of the Free"	2019	Spike Lee
"Caution"	2020	Sing Lee
"My Own Soul's Warning"	2020	Sing Lee
"My Own Soul's Warning" (Michael Hili video)	2020	Michael Hili
"Dustland" (featuring Bruce Springsteen)	2021	Unknown
"Quiet Town"	2021	Joshua Britt and Neilson Hubberd
"Runaway Horses" (featuring Phoebe Bridgers)	2021	Joshua Britt and Neilson Hubberd
"The Getting By II"	2022	Robert Machoian
"Boy"	2022	Boris Vassalo
"Your Side of Town"	2023	Tim Mattia
"Bright Lights"	2024	Micah Bickham
