= Don't Waste Your Wishes =

Compilation album by The Killers
- Released: November 18, 2016
- Recorded: 2006–2016
- Genre: Christmas
- Length: 49:17
- Label: Island

The Killers chronology
Direct Hits (2013)	Don't Waste Your Wishes (2016)	Wonderful Wonderful (2017)

Don't Waste Your Wishes is a Christmas compilation album by American rock band The Killers, featuring their yearly Christmas singles released from 2006 to 2016. One hundred percent of proceeds from sales of the album were donated to the Product Red campaign, headed by Bobby Shriver and U2 lead singer Bono. The album was released exclusively on the iTunes Store on November 18, 2016, and a limited-edition CD was released on December 9, 2016. A re-release of the vinyl was announced in December 2023, and later in 2025.

== Background ==
The Killers have become recognized for their work with the Product Red campaign, headed by Bono and Bobby Shriver. Every year from 2006 through 2016, the band released a Christmas song in support of the campaign. Every single was released around December 1, coinciding with World AIDS Day. By the time of the album's release, the band had released eleven Christmas-themed songs and music videos. The first six were included on the Killers' 2011 (Red) Christmas EP.

Music videos were released for each of the first ten tracks and a website was set up specifically for the project.

The album debuted at number 41 on Billboard's Top Rock Albums chart on December 10, 2016.

== Track listing ==
No.	Title	Writer(s)	Original release year	Length
1.	"A Great Big Sled" (featuring Toni Halliday)	The Killers	2006	4:18
2.	"Don't Shoot Me Santa" (featuring Ryan Pardey)	The Killers	2007	4:03
3.	"Joseph, Better You Than Me" (featuring Elton John and Neil Tennant)	Brandon Flowers; John; Tennant	2008	4:51
4.	"¡Happy Birthday Guadalupe!" (featuring Wild Light and Mariachi El Bronx)	The Killers; Wild Light; Mariachi El Bronx	2009	4:33
5.	"Boots" (featuring dialogue from It's a Wonderful Life)	The Killers	2010	5:27
6.	"The Cowboys' Christmas Ball" (lyrics taken from the 1890 poem of the same name)	Michael Martin Murphey; William Lawrence Chittenden	2011	3:30
7.	"I Feel It in My Bones" (featuring Ryan Pardey)	The Killers	2012	3:35
8.	"Christmas in L.A." (featuring Dawes)	Flowers; Mark Stoermer; Taylor Goldsmith; Irving Berlin	2013	4:27
9.	"Joel the Lump of Coal" (featuring Jimmy Kimmel)	The Killers; Jimmy Kimmel; Jonathan Bines	2014	3:58
10.	"Dirt Sledding" (featuring Ryan Pardey and Richard Dreyfuss)	The Killers	2015	4:27
11.	"I'll Be Home for Christmas" (featuring Ned Humphrey Hansen)	Kim Gannon; Walter Kent; Buck Ram	2016	5:58

== Charts ==
Chart (2016)	Peak position
UK Album Downloads (OCC)	75
US Top Rock Albums (Billboard)	41
