= (Red) Christmas EP =

EP by The Killers
- Released: November 29, 2011
- Recorded: 2006–2011
- Length: 26:42
- Label: Island
- Producer: Joe Chiccarelli; Flood; The Killers; Alan Moulder; Stuart Price

The Killers chronology
Live from the Royal Albert Hall (2009)	(Red) Christmas EP (2011)	Battle Born (2012)

(Red) Christmas EP is the first extended play (EP) by American rock band The Killers. It was released digitally on November 29, 2011, by Island Records. The EP features the band's yearly Christmas singles from 2006 to 2011. Proceeds from the sales from the (Red) Christmas EP have been donated to the Product Red campaign, headed by Bobby Shriver and U2 lead singer Bono.

== Background ==
The Killers have become recognized for their work with the Product Red campaign, headed by Bono and Bobby Shriver. Every year between 2006 and 2016, the band released a Christmas song in support of the campaign. Every single came out around December 1 (coinciding with World AIDS Day). As of the EP, they had released six Christmas-themed songs and music videos: "A Great Big Sled" (2006), "Don't Shoot Me Santa" (2007), "Joseph, Better You Than Me" (2008), "¡Happy Birthday Guadalupe!" (2009), "Boots" (2010), and "The Cowboys' Christmas Ball" (2011).

On November 30, 2011, the band released the (Red) Christmas EP on iTunes which features the first six songs. All proceeds from the songs have been donated to Product Red campaign and the fight against AIDS in Africa. The EP also features guest appearances from Elton John, Neil Tennant (Pet Shop Boys), Toni Halliday (Curve), Wild Light, and Mariachi El Bronx.

== Singles ==
The Killers' 2011 Christmas single, "The Cowboys' Christmas Ball", was released as the lead single from the EP.

== Commercial performance ==
The album debuted on the US Billboard 200 at number 85. It also opened on the Billboard Digital Albums chart at number 10, Rock Albums at number 11, and Alternative Albums at number nine.

== Track listing ==
No.	Title	Writer(s)	Producer(s)	Length
1.	"A Great Big Sled" (featuring Toni Halliday)	Brandon Flowers	Alan Moulder; The Killers	4:18
2.	"Don't Shoot Me Santa"	Flowers	Flood; Moulder; Killers; Stuart Price^{[a]}	4:03
3.	"Joseph, Better You than Me" (featuring Elton John and Neil Tennant)	Flowers; John; Tennant	Price; The Killers	4:51
4.	"¡Happy Birthday Guadalupe!" (featuring Wild Light and Mariachi El Bronx)	The Killers; Wild Light; Mariachi El Bronx	Price; The Killers	4:33
5.	"Boots"	The Killers	The Killers; Price^{[b]}; Joe Chiccarelli^{[b]}	5:27
6.	"The Cowboys' Christmas Ball" (lyrics taken from the 1890 poem of the same name)	Michael Martin Murphey; William Lawrence Chittenden		3:30
Total length:				26:42

Notes

- ^{^a} signifies an additional producer
- ^{^b} signifies a co-producer

== Charts ==
Chart (2011)	Peak position
Australian Albums (ARIA)	77
UK Albums (OCC)	104
US Billboard 200	85
US Top Alternative Albums (Billboard)	9
US Top Holiday Albums (Billboard)	29
US Top Rock Albums (Billboard)	11
