= Pardey =

Pardey is a surname. Notable people with the surname include:

- Lin and Larry Pardey, American and Canadian sailors and writers
- Rodney H. Pardey (born 1945), American poker player
- Ryan Pardey (born 1979), American musician, singer-songwriter, promoter, tour manager, actor, and DJ

== See also ==
- Pardew
