= ¡Happy Birthday Guadalupe! =

Single by The Killers featuring Wild Light and Mariachi El Bronx
- Released: December 1, 2009
- Recorded: 2009
- Genre: Mariachi, indie rock
- Length: 4:33
- Label: Island
- Songwriters: Brandon Flowers, Dave Keuning, Mark Stoermer, Ronnie Vannucci Jr.
- Producers: Stuart Price, The Killers

The Killers singles chronology
"A Dustland Fairytale" (2009)	"¡Happy Birthday Guadalupe!" (2009)	"Boots" (2010)

Music video
- "¡Happy Birthday Guadalupe!" on YouTube

"¡Happy Birthday Guadalupe!" is a Christmas song by Las Vegas rock band The Killers featuring Wild Light and Mariachi El Bronx, released as a digital download on December 1, 2009.

The song continues on with The Killers' tradition of releasing a Christmas song every year, and is the fourth consecutive annual Christmas song since 2006, the others being "A Great Big Sled", "Don't Shoot Me Santa" and "Joseph, Better You Than Me". All proceeds from the Christmas singles benefit the Product Red campaign.

== Music video ==
A music video, starring Luke Perry, was released for the song on December 1, 2009. In it, Perry is a cowboy searching the desert for his long-lost love, a woman named Guadalupe.

== Track listing ==
- CD Single
1. "¡Happy Birthday Guadalupe!" - 4:33

== Charts ==
Chart (2009)	Peak position
Poland (LP3)	35
UK Singles Chart	110

== In popular culture ==
The song appears in the 2015 film, "Christmas Eve".
