= Dirt Sledding =

Single by The Killers featuring Ryan Pardey and Richard Dreyfuss
- Released: November 27, 2015
- Genre: Rock; Christmas
- Length: 4:27
- Label: Island
- Songwriters: Brandon Flowers; Dave Keuning; Mark Stoermer; Ronnie Vannucci, Jr.

The Killers singles chronology
"Joel the Lump of Coal" (2014)	"Dirt Sledding" (2015)	"Peace of Mind" (2016)

Music video
- "Dirt Sledding" on YouTube

"Dirt Sledding" is a song by American rock band The Killers, featuring actor Richard Dreyfuss and the return of Ryan Pardey as Santa. It was released on November 27, 2015. The song is the third and final chapter in a trilogy storyline involving a grudge-holding Santa Claus, following tracks "Don't Shoot Me Santa" (2007) and "I Feel It in My Bones" (2012). The song marks the tenth consecutive year in which the band has released a Christmas song. As with their previous Christmas releases, all proceeds from this song go to AIDS charities as part of the Product Red campaign.

The song was named one of the best new holidays songs of the 2010s by Rolling Stone.

== Music video ==
The video for "Dirt Sledding" was directed and co-produced by actor and director Matthew Gray Gubler, who is also a native of Las Vegas and directed the first video in the Santa Claus trilogy, "Don't Shoot Me Santa". The video features a reprisal of Santa Claus played by Pardey, as well as a spoken word section by Dreyfuss.

The car used in the video is a Guards Red 1983 Porsche 944 which pays reference to the same exact one used in the 1984 John Hughes film Sixteen Candles (as heard in the lyrics).

== Track listing ==
Digital Download

1. "Dirt Sledding" – 4:27
