= Brad Prowly =

- Also known as: Super Bad Brad
- Born: 1962 (age 63–64)
- Origin: New York City, New York, United States
- Occupation: Street performer
- Website: bradprowly.wordpress.com

Brad Prowly a.k.a. "Super Bad Brad" (born 1962) is a New York City street performer frequently appearing in the Greenwich Village area, performing R&B classics with the aid of a boombox and microphone.

In 2001 Brad toured Europe as the opening act for The Fun Lovin' Criminals.

In 2003, he appeared in a short film titled Karaoke Man by Adolfo Doring, in which he narrates while being followed to his "place of work" on the streets.

In 2005, he appeared at the Apollo Theater performing "Let's Get It On", originally by Marvin Gaye, in which he received a standing ovation.

In addition, he performed regularly at the Belmar Irish Pub in Binghamton, New York, in August and September 2009. Following his stay in Binghamton he traveled to Boston, Massachusetts, where he has been spotted singing outside the Berklee College of Music as recently as October 2009.

The 2006 music video for the Republic of Loose song "The Idiots", features Brad Prowly, as a street performer, busking the song to an audience.

He stars in The Killers' music video for their 2010 Christmas song "Boots", directed by Jared Hess (Napoleon Dynamite).

== Video Links ==
- Karaoke Man
- "Let's Get it On" Live at the Apollo Theater
- Performing "Let's Get It On" by Marvin Gaye
- Performing "You'll Never Find" by Lou Rawls
- Performing "Kung Fu Fighting" by Carl Douglas
- Performing "For The Love Of Money" by The O'Jays
- Performing "Anarchy in the U.K" by the Sex Pistols
- A compilation of songs performed on Mar 11, 2011 (14mins)
- Performing outside Berklee College of Music on October 20, 2009
- Brad Prowly sings Michael Jackson's Ben
- Crying (Roy Orbison) Boston June 18, 2010
- Republic of Loose - The Idiots - Director Adolfo Doring
