= Boots (song) =

Single by The Killers
- Released: November 30, 2010
- Recorded: 2010
- Genre: Indie rock
- Length: 5:28 (single version); 4.43 (radio edit)
- Label: Island
- Songwriter: The Killers
- Producers: Stuart Price, Joe Chiccarelli, The Killers

The Killers singles chronology
| "¡Happy Birthday Guadalupe!" (2009) | "Boots" (2010) | "The Cowboys' Christmas Ball" (2011) |

Music video
- "Boots" on YouTube

"Boots" is a Christmas song by Las Vegas rock band The Killers, which was released as a digital download on November 30, 2010, despite the band being on hiatus. All proceeds from the song go to AIDS charities as part of the (PRODUCT)^{RED} campaign, headed by Bono and Bobby Shriver.

The song continues The Killers' tradition of releasing a Christmas song every year, and is the fifth consecutive annual Christmas song since 2006, the others being "A Great Big Sled", "Don't Shoot Me Santa", "Joseph, Better You Than Me" and "¡Happy Birthday Guadalupe!". Lead singer Brandon Flowers is quoted as saying, "Our Christmas single with (RED) is one of our traditions as a band. We didn't want to let it fall by the wayside just because we're on hiatus; this cause is too important".

All proceeds from the Christmas singles benefit the Product Red campaign.

This is the first Killers release to not feature their trademark neon light styled logo on the cover. Instead, the cover seems to be drawing inspiration from the DVD releases covers of the 1941 film Citizen Kane and other 1940s-era black-and-white film title card logos.

The snowglobe with boots in it is also a reference to Citizen Kane, as the opening scene shows the main character, Charles Foster Kane, dying while looking into a snowglobe.

The song features dialogue from the Christmas movie It's a Wonderful Life.

== Music video ==
The music video, directed by Jared Hess and T. C. Christensen, premiered exclusively on the Starbucks website on December 1, 2010 (World AIDS Day) with Starbucks paying $0.05 for every view towards the cause. The video begins with a clip of George Bailey praying from It's a Wonderful Life and features Brad Prowly a.k.a. "Super Bad Brad", a famous New York City street performer.

== Response ==
=== Commercial ===
The song debuted at number three on the Billboard Holiday chart.

=== Charts ===
| Chart (2010) | Peak position |
|---|---|
| UK Singles Chart | 53 |
| Billboard Hot 100 | 79 |

== Track listing ==
- CD single
1. "Boots" - 5:27
