= Pardew =

Pardew is a surname. Notable people with the surname include:

- Alan Pardew (born 1961), English football manager and former player
- James W. Pardew (1944–2021), American diplomat and military officer

== See also ==
- Pardey
- Perdew
