= Perdew =

Perdew is a surname. Notable people with the surname include:

- John Perdew (born 1943), American theoretical physicist
- Kelly Perdew (born 1967), American businessman

== See also ==
- Pardew
