= The Lazarus Effect (2010 film) =

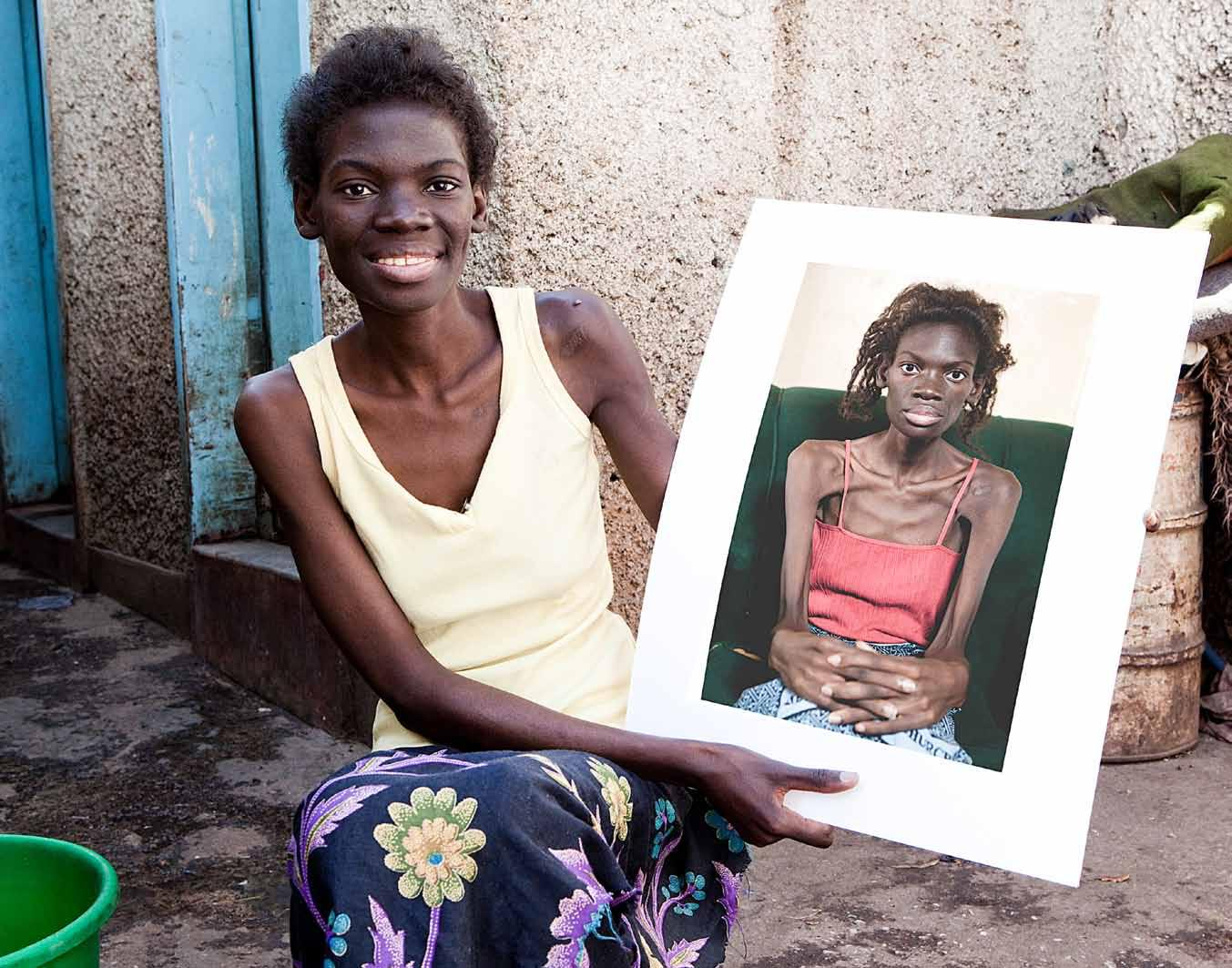
- Concillia Muhau, who is featured in the film, with an earlier picture of herself
- Directed by: Lance Bangs
- Country of origin: United States
- Original language: English

Production
- Running time: 30 minutes
- Production company: Red

Original release
- Network: HBO
- Release: May 24, 2010

The Lazarus Effect is a 2010 documentary film about the positive impact of free antiretroviral drug therapy on HIV/AIDS patients in Africa. It was directed by Lance Bangs, and executive produced by Spike Jonze, after an organizer from AIDS awareness group Red suggested the project to them. The film features patients and medical staff in Zambia speaking about their experiences and was produced by Red and HBO. It was screened on HBO and Channel 4 in May 2010, and it is also available on YouTube.

== Synopsis ==
Made in Zambia, the 30-minute film tracks several people who were seriously ill but return to a healthier condition in a relatively short period of time after starting free antiretroviral drug therapy. HIV-positive patients and medical staff recount their experiences and the impact medication has made on their lives in their own words.

They include Constance Mudenda, a mother whose children all died of AIDS, and who now works as a peer education supervisor at an AIDS clinic; Paul Nsangu, a young husband and father; Bwalya, an 11-year-old girl who at the beginning of the film looks like a child half her age, because of her disease; and Concillia Muhau, a young mother who recovered from the brink of death, and now also works as a peer counselor.

Interviewees describe their illness and recovery; they also speak about the difficulties involved in persuading people to have themselves tested for HIV, given the severe social stigma that results from a positive test result, and in getting word about the available treatment out to remote rural areas, as well as the logistical problems of providing care to patients who may have to walk for four days and three nights to reach a clinic.

== Background ==
Bangs and Jonze made the film after they were contacted by an organizer from AIDS awareness group Red. The organizer suggested they film a documentary in AIDS clinics in Zambia, where one out of seven people is HIV-positive, and one person's daily dose of antiretroviral drugs costs about 40 cents according to Red – a cost which many patients are unable to afford. Red's member companies use 50 per cent of their profits from Red licensing products to contribute to The Global Fund to Fight AIDS, Tuberculosis and Malaria. This, along with the President's Emergency Plan for AIDS Relief, provides the majority of funding for AIDS programmes in Africa, including the provision of free antiretroviral drugs to some three million people. Antiretroviral drugs, when taken regularly, are able to restore vitality to HIV-positive people, enabling them to lead normal lives.

Executive producer Jonze asked Bangs to direct the documentary, as Jonze was still busy completing Where the Wild Things Are. Bangs then made three journeys to Africa in 2009 to make the film, determined "to let the people speak for themselves, rather than have a lot of earnest Western talking heads". Explaining the film concept to the Portland Mercury, Bangs said: "I've seen enough horrible documentaries that objectify people or assign them victimhood status. That was pretty appalling to me, and was not the film I wanted to make. I wanted to talk to people directly and get them to open up and be funny or goofy or whatever personality traits they have that don't usually come out in AIDS documentaries."

Bangs said he was profoundly moved by his experience in Africa: "I had lost friends and teachers to AIDS and AIDS-related illnesses, but at least in the West the drugs are available. In Africa I was shocked at how skeletal our interviewees’ faces were, how their eyes bulged from their sockets. After just a few months on their drugs they were transformed." The film's title is based on the Biblical story of Lazarus, whom Jesus raised from the dead, and echoes the feelings of those who recovered thanks to drug therapy.

== Promotion ==
U2 singer Bono helped promote the documentary and associated campaign, and gathered a group of A-List celebrities to make an advertisement for it. This featured short scenes, filmed by French photographer Brigitte Lacombe, with stars like Penélope Cruz, Javier Bardem, Ludacris and others showing the trivial items that can be bought for US$0.40. The documentary itself premiered at the New York Museum of Modern Art on May 4, 2010. Constance Mudenda and Concillia Muhau, two of the women portrayed in the film, travelled to New York for the premiere.

The documentary was screened on HBO and Channel 4 on May 24, 2010, and also placed on YouTube.

== Reception ==
The "Watch This" column in The Guardian stated, "It's hard to imagine that there could be a positive story to be told about HIV in Africa – if there is, however, The Lazarus Effect is probably it." Paul Whitelaw, writing in The Scotsman, called the film "a surprisingly uplifting and quirk-free documentary about growing efforts to curb the scourge of HIV/Aids in Africa [...] A heartening story of hope." Critic Noel Murray of The A.V. Club described the film as a "straight-up advocacy doc, designed to get anyone who watches it to open their wallets. And it’s remarkably effective at that."

Sarah Mirk, writing in the Portland Mercury, praised the film for breathing "sincere life and inspiration into the often schlocky world of AIDS movies", saying, "There's no heavy-handed Western narrator here to explain the crisis. There are only the patients and their nurses, all HIV-positive, discussing their lives and laughing in joy at their successes, backed by a lively Chicago brass-band soundtrack rather than the cliché tribal drums or Graceland-style songs. It's a hopeful film. It's a vibrant film."
