= Rodney H. Pardey =

American poker player (1945–2020)

Rodney Pardey
- Nicknames: Senior, Magoo
- Born: May 5, 1945; Vincennes, Indiana, U.S.
- Died: August 1, 2020 (aged 75); Oregon, U.S.

World Series of Poker
- Bracelets: 2
- Money finishes: 14
- Highest WSOP Main Event finish: 52nd, 2005

Rodney Herm "Rod" Pardey (May 5, 1945 – August 1, 2020) was an American poker player. Pardey was the father of singer/songwriter and former tour manager of The Killers, Ryan Pardey, as well as professional poker player and singer/songwriter Rodney E. Pardey.

== Career ==
In Las Vegas, Pardey primarily played seven-card stud. In the late 1970s David Sklansky ranked Pardey the number one seven-card stud player in the world. By the end of the 1970s, Pardey was regularly playing as high as $1,000-$2,000. When hold'em became popular in the 1980s, Pardey expressed his trouble in adjusting. In May 1995, Pardey played regularly in Los Angeles, California.

His career tournament poker winnings exceed $725,000. He won two World Series of Poker championships, as well as finishing second in the 2015 "Super Seniors" no limit hold'em event.

== World Series of Poker Bracelets ==
Year	Tournament	Prize (US$)
1991	$2,500 Seven Card Stud	$133,600
1994	$2,500 Seven Card Stud	$132,000

== Personal life ==
Rodney was the father of three children: Rodney Erin Pardey, Ryan Joseph Pardey, and Lucynda Laurynne Campbell.

Before becoming a career poker player, Pardey was a professional bowler. In 1977, Pardey bought Skyway Park Bowl in south Seattle with younger brother, David Pardey. Skyway Park Bowl expanded to include a casino in the late 1990s and later hosted PBA tour events, including three visits from ABC.

On August 4, 2020, Pardey's son Rodney Jr. announced that Rodney Herm Pardey had suffered a major stroke on June 29, 2020, and died due to complications from the stroke on August 1, 2020.
