= Joel the Lump of Coal =

Single by The Killers featuring Jimmy Kimmel
- Released: December 1, 2014
- Genre: Rock, Christmas music
- Length: 3:58
- Label: Island
- Songwriters: Brandon Flowers, Dave Keuning, Mark Stoermer, Ronnie Vannucci Jr, Jimmy Kimmel, Jonathan Bines
- Producer: Ariel Rechtshaid

The Killers singles chronology
"Christmas in L.A." (2013)	"Joel the Lump of Coal" (2014)	"Dirt Sledding" (2015)

"Joel the Lump of Coal" is a song by Las Vegas-based rock band The Killers featuring late night talk show host Jimmy Kimmel. It was released on December 1, 2014. The song marks the ninth consecutive year in which the band has released a Christmas song. As with their previous Christmas releases, all proceeds from this song go to AIDS charities as part of the Product Red campaign. The song's announcement and debut occurred on Jimmy Kimmel Live!, where the music video and a montage about the recording process aired.

== Music video ==
The animated music video first aired on Jimmy Kimmel Live! (December 1, 2014). The style of the video is similar to that of the stop motion animated Rudolph the Red-Nosed Reindeer (1964) and other Rankin/Bass Productions holiday-themed films in digital collage form. The song tells the story of Joel, a lump of coal living at the North Pole. Joel is excited when Santa chooses him to be a child's present, but he is disappointed to learn that instead of being a special gift, Santa is taking him to a naughty boy for Christmas. Joel reluctantly accepts his fate, but he soon realizes that he is just the present the naughty boy needs to help him change his ways. At the end, selfless Joel turns himself into a diamond to make the naughty boy happy.

The song is written by Jimmy Kimmel, Jonathan Bines, and the Killers (Flowers, Keuning, Vannucci and Stoermer) with additional material by Tony Barbieri. The video is directed by Jonathan Kimmel, produced by Jennifer Sharron, and edited by Jason Bielski. The animation is by Sean Michael Solomon, Julian Petschek, Jonathan Kimmel, Jesse Griffith and Patrick Campbell, with Bernd Reinhardt as Director of Photography and Jim Alario as cameraman. The sound mix was recorded at Henson Studios, with field sound recorded by Brian Angely and Todd JeanPierre.

== Track listing ==
Digital Download

1. "Joel the Lump of Coal" – 3:58

== Charts ==
Chart (2014)	Peak position
Mexico Ingles Airplay (Billboard)	41
UK Singles (Official Charts Company)	160
US Hot Rock & Alternative Songs (Billboard)	27
