= Peace of Mind (The Killers song) =

Single by the Killers

from the album Sam's Town (10th Anniversary edition)
- Released: October 7, 2016
- Recorded: 2016
- Studio: Studio at the Palms (Las Vegas, Nevada)
- Genre: Alternative rock; arena rock
- Length: 4:43
- Label: Island
- Songwriters: Brandon Flowers; Dave Keuning
- Producers: Flood; Alan Moulder; the Killers

The Killers singles chronology
"Dirt Sledding" (2015)	"Peace of Mind" (2016)	"The Man" (2017)

Audio video
- "Peace of Mind" on YouTube

"Peace of Mind" is a song by American rock band the Killers, released as a single from the remastered double vinyl celebrating the 10th anniversary of Sam's Town (2006). The song, written by founding members Brandon Flowers and Dave Keuning, was originally a demo track recorded in 2006 during sessions for Sam's Town. The song peaked at No. 39 on Billboard's Hot Rock & Alternative Songs chart.

== Background and release ==
"Peace of Mind" was written by frontman Brandon Flowers and founding guitarist Dave Keuning, and produced by Flood, Alan Moulder, and the Killers, who produced the rest of Sam's Town.

"Peace of Mind" was first announced alongside the Sam's Town 10th Anniversary double vinyl reissue, which was revealed on August 1, 2016. Alongside the announcement of the double vinyl reissue, two shows dates playing Sam's Town cover-to-cover were announced at Sam's Town Hotel and Gambling Hall, the namesake of the album. "Peace of Mind", along with the double vinyl reissue, was released on October 7, 2016 via Bong Load Records.

== Reception ==
"Peace of Mind" was met with positive reviews upon release. Stereogum magazine called the song "a grand, sweeping ballad," noting that "hearing a song like this for the first time in 2016 is a striking experience". Consequence of Sound remarked that "this leftover cut is a sweeping affair, and sees Brandon Flowers beckoning over a jaunty piano", and A.V. Club magazine described the song as having "Steinman-esque bombast and wordplay, swirling ‘60s organs, and big guitars". Uproxx called the song "a swirl of massive builds and post-U2 touchstones".

== Personnel ==
Credits adapted from the liner notes of Sam's Town.

=== The Killers ===
- Brandon Flowers
- Dave Keuning
- Mark Stoermer
- Ronnie Vannucci Jr.

=== Technical ===
- Flood – production, recording, mixing
- Alan Moulder – production, recording, mixing
- The Killers – production
- Howie Weinberg – mastering

=== Studios ===
- Studio at the Palms (Las Vegas, Nevada) – recording
- Assault & Battery (London) – mixing
- Masterdisk (New York City) – mastering

== Charts ==
Chart (2016)	Peak position
US Hot Rock & Alternative Songs (Billboard)	39

== Release history ==
Region	Date	Format	Label	Ref.
Various	October 7, 2016	Digital download; streaming	Island	
