= Christmas in L.A. =

Single by The Killers featuring Dawes
- Released: December 1, 2013
- Genre: Rock; Christmas music
- Length: 4:27
- Label: Island
- Songwriters: Brandon Flowers; Dave Keuning; Mark Stoermer; Ronnie Vannucci, Jr.; Taylor Goldsmith; Irving Berlin
- Producer: Steve Lillywhite

The Killers singles chronology
"Just Another Girl" (2013)	"Christmas in L.A." (2013)	"Joel the Lump of Coal" (2014)

Music video
- "Christmas in L.A." on YouTube

"Christmas in L.A." is a song by Las Vegas-based rock band The Killers featuring Dawes, released on December 1, 2013. The song marks the eighth consecutive year in which the band has released a Christmas song. As with their seven previous releases, all proceeds from this song goes to AIDS charities as part of the Product Red campaign. The song was written by Brandon Flowers and Mark Stoermer of The Killers and Taylor Goldsmith from Dawes. Irving Berlin also has a writing credit due to the song featuring lyrics from "White Christmas".

== Music video ==
The music video for the song was unveiled on December 1, 2013. The video features actor Owen Wilson portraying a struggling actor in Los Angeles at Christmastime. Actor Harry Dean Stanton also appears as a voice of reason.

The music video was directed by Kelly Loosli and filmed and animated by students and alumni from Brigham Young University. The video was produced by Kelly Loosli, Thomas Lefler, Kyle Stapley, and Cassie Hiatt. Jordan Hunter, a student at BYU, edited the video. The late singer-songwriter Warren Zevon appears briefly in an animated portion of the video after the lyrics reference his song "Carmelita".

== Track listing ==
Digital Download

1. "Christmas in L.A." – 4:27

== Charts ==
Chart (2013)	Peak position
Belgium (Ultratip Bubbling Under Flanders)	81
Ireland (IRMA)	100
UK Singles (Official Charts Company)	92
US Hot Rock & Alternative Songs (Billboard)	43
