= The Cowboys' Christmas Ball =

Single by The Killers

from the EP (Red) Christmas EP
- Released: November 30, 2011
- Recorded: 2011
- Genre: Country, cowboy, Christmas
- Length: 3:30
- Label: Island
- Songwriters: Michael Martin Murphey, William Lawrence Chittenden

The Killers singles chronology
"Boots" (2010)	"The Cowboys' Christmas Ball" (2011)	"Runaways" (2012)

Music video
- "The Cowboys' Christmas Ball" on YouTube

"The Cowboys' Christmas Ball" is a country Christmas song recorded by Las Vegas rock band, The Killers. The lyrics of the song were taken from the 1890s poem of the same name by William Lawrence Chittenden. John Lomax included the lyrics to this song in his book "Cowboy Songs" (copyright 1910) with these notes: "This poem was one of the Larry Chittenden's Ranch Verses, published by GP Putnam's Sons, New York, has been set to music by cowboys and its phraseology slightly changed, as this copy will show, by oral transmission. I have heard it in New Mexico and it has been sent to me from various places, — always as a song. None of those who sent in the song knew that it was already in print." The Killers version has slight lyrical changes. For instance, the first line was changed from "Way out in Western Texas, where the Clear Fork's waters flow" to "Way out in Old Nevada, where the Truckees' waters flow".

The song was released as a digital download on November 30, 2011, the video was released a day later. All proceeds from the song go to AIDS charities as a part of the Product Red campaign, headed by Bono and Bobby Shriver. It is the band's sixth annual Christmas song and was released as the lead single off their compilation EP, (RED) Christmas EP.

The song was also recorded by Michael Martin Murphey on his CD "Cowboy Christmas" (Cowboy Songs II).

== Charts ==
Chart (2011)	Peak position
UK Singles Chart	112
