= I Feel It in My Bones =

Single by the Killers
- Released: December 4, 2012
- Genre: Alternative rock, holiday music
- Label: Island
- Songwriters: Brandon Flowers, Dave Keuning, Ronnie Vannucci Jr., Mark Stoermer

The Killers singles chronology
"Miss Atomic Bomb" (2012)	"I Feel It in My Bones" (2012)	"Here with Me" (2012)

Music video
- "I Feel It in My Bones" on YouTube

"I Feel It in My Bones" is a song by Las Vegas-based rock band The Killers. The song was the band's 7th consecutive Christmas song and is a sequel to their 2007 song, "Don't Shoot Me Santa". As with their six previous releases, all proceeds from this song goes to AIDS charities as part of the Product Red campaign.

== Release ==
The song premiered on RollingStone on December 1, 2012. The song was made available in digital stores on December 4.

== Music video ==
The music video for the song again features Ryan Pardey, who reprises his role as Santa, from "Don't Shoot Me Santa" (2007). The video was directed by Roboshobo, who also directed the band's previous Christmas Single "The Cowboy's Christmas Ball" (2011). The video shows Santa hunting down The Killers members in order to kill them, as they feature on his "Naughty" list. On his travels, Santa encounters a gas station attendant, played by Tony Vannucci, brother of the band's drummer, Ronnie. Upon seeing a reindeer's head mounted on the wall, Santa binds the attendant with tinsel and blows up the building with a decorated grenade. Santa continues to track down The Killers, walking into a house, where children have received a vinyl edition of The Killers' latest album, "Battle Born", where he commences to take the record off the gramophone and smashes it in half. The video concludes with Santa standing over lead singer Brandon Flowers' bed, laughing. The end credits roll and Santa's voice is heard as he sings "Silent Night". This is the third time The Killers collaborated with Ryan Pardey.

=== Chart performance ===
Chart (2012)	Peak position
United Kingdom (UK Singles Chart)	70
US Rock Songs (Billboard)	41
