= Joseph, Better You than Me =

"Joseph, Better You Than Me"

Single by The Killers featuring Elton John and Neil Tennant
- Released: December 16, 2008
- Genre: Indie rock, Christmas
- Length: 4:53
- Label: Island
- Songwriters: Brandon Flowers, Elton John, Neil Tennant
- Producers: Stuart Price, The Killers

The Killers singles chronology
"Spaceman" (2008)	"Joseph, Better You Than Me" (2008)	"The World We Live In" (2009)

Elton John singles chronology
"Calling It Christmas" (2006)	"Joseph, Better You than Me" (2008)	"Tiny Dancer (Hold Me Closer)" (2009)

Music video
- "Joseph, Better You Than Me" on YouTube

"Joseph, Better You Than Me" is a song by the American rock band the Killers, featuring British musicians Elton John and Neil Tennant. The song was released on December 16, 2008, as a download-only single. All proceeds from the song benefit the Product Red campaign, headed by Bono and Bobby Shriver. The music video features footage from The Living Christ series.

The song continued the tradition of The Killers releasing a digital download Christmas single that started with "A Great Big Sled" in 2006 and continued with "Don't Shoot Me Santa" in 2007. Lead singer Brandon Flowers said it was great to work with two "real professionals" and "would love to work with them again".

The song speaks of Saint Joseph, the adoptive father of Jesus. Flowers, John, and Tennant take turns in describing the difficulties that he must have felt being a father to Jesus. They also sing of the public attention Joseph would have received.

== Track listing ==
1. "Joseph, Better You Than Me" - 4:53

== Charts ==
Chart (2008)	Peak position
Canadian Hot 100	43
UK Singles Chart	88
Austria Singles Top 75	64
