= Wild Light =

American indie rock band

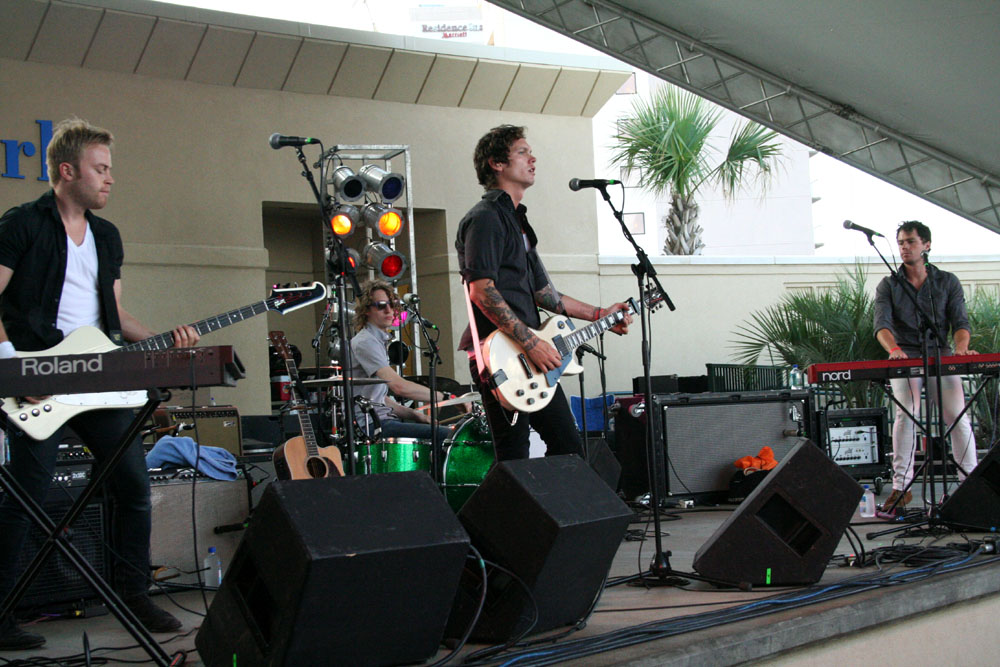
- Wild Light performing in Virginia Beach, Virginia

Background information
- Origin: New Hampshire, United States
- Genres: Indie rock Indie pop
- Years active: 2005–present
- Label: Startime International
- Members: Tim Kile; Seth Pitman; Jordan Alexander; Seth Kasper
- Website: www.wildlightmusic.com

Wild Light is an American four-piece indie rock band from New Hampshire, United States, composed of multi-instrumentalists/vocalists Tim Kile and Seth Pitman, guitarist/vocalist Jordan Alexander, and drummer Seth Kasper. The band formed in 2005 and released its first full-length album, Adult Nights, in March 2009. Kile is a former member of the Canadian band, Arcade Fire.

== Biography ==
Wild Light began when Tim and Jordan began making music together in elementary school. In high school, they joined with Seth Pitman and Seth Kasper to form a band. Jordan attended Phillips Exeter Academy in New Hampshire, where he shared a room with Win Butler - future lead singer of Arcade Fire. Tim met Win through Jordan, and after high school, Tim moved to Montreal to start the first incarnation of what would become Arcade Fire with Win and Josh Deu, the artist behind the Adult Nights cover. Tim left the group after a year, and in 2005 Kasper, Seth, Jordan and Tim reunited to form Wild Light. Through their relationship with Arcade Fire, the two bands toured extensively throughout Europe in late 2007. In the summer of 2008, Wild Light traveled to Los Angeles and entered the recording studio to work with producer Rob Schnapf on their debut album, Adult Nights (StarTime International), which was released on March 3, 2009.

== Accomplishments ==
=== 2007 ===
- In 2007, the band opened for Arcade Fire and LCD Soundsystem at the Hollywood Bowl and Shoreline Amphitheatre in California, as well as Randall's Island in New York City. They joined Arcade Fire on their full European tour in October 2007, starting in Dublin, Ireland, and ending in mid-November with three dates at London's Alexandra Palace. That year, the band also released a four-song, self-titled EP.

=== 2008 ===
- In early 2008 they opened for The Stills on a short tour, and made their debut at Austin's South by Southwest Music Festival where they were featured on Steve Lamacq’s BBC 6 Music show. In December 2008, the band won Outstanding Rock Act of The Year at the Boston Music Awards.

=== 2009 ===
- In early 2009, Wild Light opened for Tapes 'n Tapes on its US tour. The band went on to play SXSW again in March 2009, becoming one of the festival's most notable acts of the year, according to Rolling Stone.
- From April to May 2009, Wild Light opened for The Killers on the first leg of their worldwide tour.
- The band also did a collaboration with The Killers on the latter's Christmas single, "¡Happy Birthday Guadalupe!" which also features Mariachi el Bronx. The single was released on December 1, 2009.

== Discography ==
=== Albums ===
- Adult Nights (2009)

=== Singles ===
- "California on My Mind" (2009)
- "Happy Birthday Guadalupe" (with The Killers and Mariachi el Bronx) (2009)
