= Ryan Pardey =

American singer-songwriter

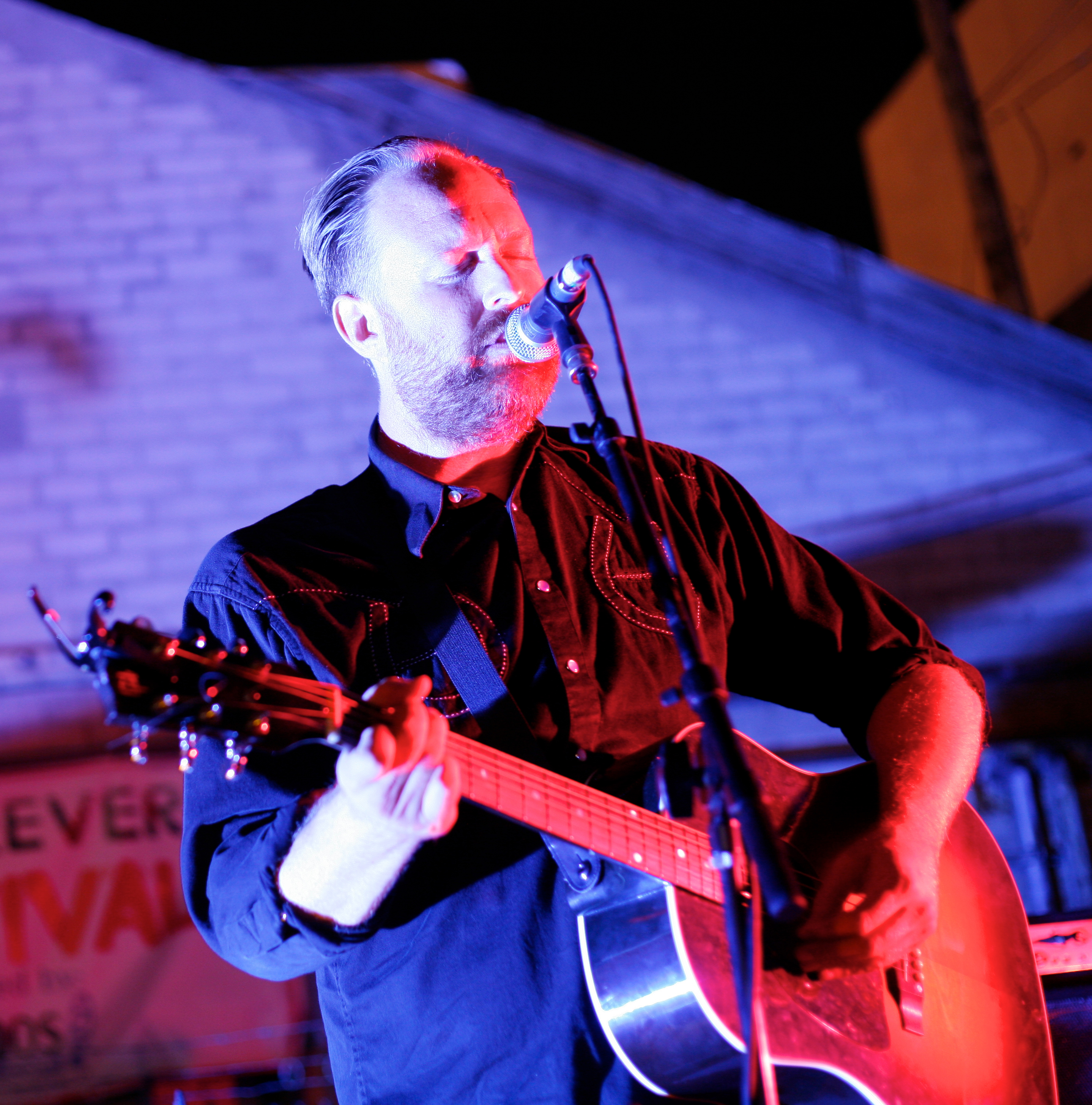
- Pardey performing in 2011

Background information
- Born: Ryan Joseph Pardey; February 25, 1979 (age 47); Las Vegas, Nevada, U.S.
- Genres: Indie folk, indie rock
- Occupations: Singer, songwriter, promoter, tour manager, actor, DJ
- Instruments: Guitar, vocals
- Years active: 1999–present
- Member of: Halloween Town

Ryan Joseph Pardey (born February 25, 1979) is a musician, singer, songwriter, promoter, tour manager, actor, and DJ from Las Vegas. He is best known as the singer and songwriter for the band Halloween Town, which has featured members of the Killers, Louis XIV, and the Shys. Pardey is also well known for portraying Santa Claus on the songs "A Great Big Sled" (2006) and "Don't Shoot Me Santa"(2007) by the Killers. Pardey appeared as Santa again in the songs and as illustrations in the artwork in the Killers' two sequel Christmas singles, "I Feel It in My Bones" (2012) and "Dirt Sledding" (2015), in which he played a grudge-holding Santa.

== Early life ==
Ryan Joseph Pardey was born on February 25, 1979, the son of professional poker player Rodney H. Pardey. His brother is Rodney E. Pardey, who is also a professional poker player and musician. Pardey attended high school at the Las Vegas Academy of International Studies, Performing and Visual Arts in Las Vegas during the late 1990s. In his senior year, he played the lead role of preacher C.C. Showers in a production of the controversial The Diviners, where he acted on stage beside Matthew Gray Gubler, Baron Vaughn, and Rutina Wesley.

After graduation, Pardey soon became the owner and operator of Café Espresso Roma, a coffee shop and music venue located across from UNLV. While helping to jump start his career in event promotion, the café also served as the breeding ground for the Killers, where the band performed their first show on February 1, 2002.

== Career ==
=== 2003–2007: The Killers ===
While touring with the Killers as their assistant, Pardey became known as "The Captain" by members of the band's fan club. During the tour, he also appeared as Santa on stage with the Killers during their performance of their Christmas songs on The Tonight Show With Jay Leno, and during their performance in Los Angeles for the KROQ Almost Acoustic Christmas. He continued as tour manager for the Killers until the release of the band's debut studio album, Hot Fuss, in June 2004, when he was replaced by long time tour manager Jeremy Bates. At this time, Pardey began writing the first Halloween Town album.

The song "Questions with the Captain" is a hidden track on the Killers' 2007 compilation album Sawdust written about Pardey's tenure as tour manager. The song is also used as the theme song for a web series starring Pardey, in which he interviews members of the Killers.

=== 2008–2009: Halloween Town 7" release ===
After returning home from touring with The Killers, Pardey experienced what he refers to as his "darkest most self-destructive period". He told Las Vegas Weekly: "Without Mark Stoermer, there'd be no Halloween Town...I knew I needed to stabilize my life. Mark helped me bring my ideas to life." With the encouragement of Stoermer, who was Pardey's roommate at the time, Ryan began writing songs for Halloween Town, a name Pardey has said he used to serve as a metaphor for Las Vegas. Stoermer would later play bass for Pardey's band at their first show.

In 2008, while writing for the album, Pardey test performed the songs for live audiences, opening for such acts as the Whigs, Tokyo Police Club, and the Silent Comedy. In Feb 2009, San Diego–based rock band the Shys joined Pardey as his backing band on stage in Las Vegas, and again later that month at Bed Rock Studios in Echo Park. Ryan continued to utilize the Shys primarily as his live band, while he began recruiting members of Louis XIV as his studio band, along with the Killers bassist Mark Stoermer.

In September 2009, Halloween Town opened for The Killers at the Mandalay Bay Events Center in Las Vegas. The band's live performance featured members of The Shys, Louis XIV, and Transfer. Immediately after the show, Pardey and company appeared at The Aruba Showroom to celebrate the Las Vegas music festival Neon Reverb, where Halloween Town performed for the release of their EP Summer (The Dreamer From 1997), which the band released on 7" vinyl. Ryan toured the Midwestern United States as a solo artist in December 2009.

=== 2010–2012: Zafra Ct. ===
Halloween Town continued to play concerts through 2010, opening for the Killers at a secret Highline Ballroom show in New York City in January. Between shows and traveling, Pardey took up a DJ residency at the Beauty Bar in the Fremont East music district where he also began hosting a karaoke night. In March, Pardey relocated from Las Vegas to Austin, Texas, where he would play in the SXSW music festival, after which he continued to perform shows in and around Austin for two months before relocating again to San Diego, where he would begin recording the band's first LP.

In June 2010, Pardey returned to Las Vegas to perform new songs from his forthcoming Halloween Town album at a benefit for Arbo De Vivo, a nonprofit organization dedicated to helping impoverished people of the world. This specific event focused on support for Haiti after the devastating earthquake that ravaged the nation earlier in the year.

In May 2011, Halloween Town began a residency at The Palms hotel in Las Vegas. When asked when the Halloween Town LP would be released, Pardey responded by saying, "I guess some time in July...Since I'm an old man already, I don't need to rush."

On September 9, 2011, Halloween Town released their debut LP Zafra Ct. on Cornstalk Records, a label created by friend Matthew Gubler. The album was named after the street Pardey grew up on, and features collaborations and production by a star lineup of musicians, which include Shaun Cornell of Transfer), and Michael Stratton of 12 Volt Sex), Mark Stoermer and Dave Keuning of the Killers, Jason Hill and Brian Karscig of Louis XIV, and Matt Dublin of The Red Romance and Ambulance LTD.

Zafra Ct. was voted one of 10 best albums of 2011 in Las Vegas by CityLife magazine. In a 2012 reader poll given by Vegas Seven magazine, Halloween Town was selected as "Best Unsigned Vegas Band That a Big Label Should Go Ahead and Sign Already".

=== 2015–present: New work ===
In October 2015, Pardey led the second reopening of the Las Vegas venue bar known as The Bunkhouse. The venue was sold to Tony Hsieh's Las Vegas–based Downtown Project in June 2013, closed, renovated, and then reopened in August 2014, only to close less than a year after reopening. Pardey was brought on as Entertainment Director when the venue reopened for a second time in late 2015.

In November 2015, Pardey appeared in the Matthew Gray Gubler-directed music video for the song "Dirt Sledding" by The Killers. Pardey sings on the song, which features actor Richard Dreyfuss, and he appears in the artwork for the cover of the single.
