= Don't Shoot Me Santa =

Single by The Killers
- Released: November 27, 2007
- Genre: Rock, holiday music
- Length: 4:03
- Label: Island
- Songwriters: Brandon Flowers, Dave Keuning, Mark Stoermer, Ronnie Vannucci, Jr.
- Producers: Stuart Price, Alan Moulder, Flood

The Killers singles chronology
"Tranquilize" (2007)	"Don't Shoot Me Santa" (2007)	"Human" (2008)

Music video
- "Don't Shoot Me Santa" on YouTube

"Don't Shoot Me Santa" is a song by Las Vegas-based rock band The Killers. The song was released November 27, 2007, as a digital download. A portion of the proceeds from this song went to AIDS charities as part of the Product Red campaign, headed by Bono and Bobby Shriver. It is The Killers' second Christmas download single following 2006's "A Great Big Sled".

== Track listing ==
- CD Single
1. "Don't Shoot Me Santa" - 4:04
2. "Don't Shoot Me Santa" (Enhanced Video) - 4:34

== Release history ==
Region	Date	Format
United States	November 27, 2007	Download
United States	December 4, 2007	Compact disc
United Kingdom	December 17, 2007	Compact disc

== Music video ==
According to Japanese Vogue, the video for "Don't Shoot Me Santa" was directed, edited, and co-produced by actor/director/model/visual artist Matthew Gray Gubler, who is also a native of Las Vegas.

The music video starts in a desert with a puppet version of Flowers and a puppet version of Santa in a puppet theater in Santa's trailer. Then, Santa pops up to say his part "I've got a bullet in my gun!" It goes to Flowers tied up in a chair with Christmas tree trimmings and Santa running around him. Later on, Flowers is tied up in Santa's car with Santa driving. It then goes back to Santa's trailer with Flowers still tied up in a chair watching Santa dig up his grave. The band comes up behind 3 small trees, breaks the trimmings, and escapes in Santa's car, trailing him behind. Santa ends up covering up Flowers's puppet, and goes to the band (in puppet form) holding up a sign saying, 'Merry Christmas from The Killers'.

== Ryan Pardey ==
The role of Santa (both singing and acting in the music video) is performed by Ryan Pardey. He performed this song live, with the band, at KROQ Almost Acoustic Christmas in December 2007. He and Flowers were shown dancing together on stage, and he soaked Flowers with a water gun. The Killers have written a song about Pardey called "Questions With the Captain". The song appears as a hidden track at the end of their B-sides album Sawdust, but can only be found on physical releases of the album.

== Charts ==
Chart (2007)	Peak position
Canada Hot 100 (Billboard)	23
Ireland (IRMA)	49
Scotland Singles (OCC)	21
UK Singles (OCC)	34
US Bubbling Under Hot 100 (Billboard)	8
