= Product Red =

Brand that engages firms to eliminate HIV/AIDS in Africa

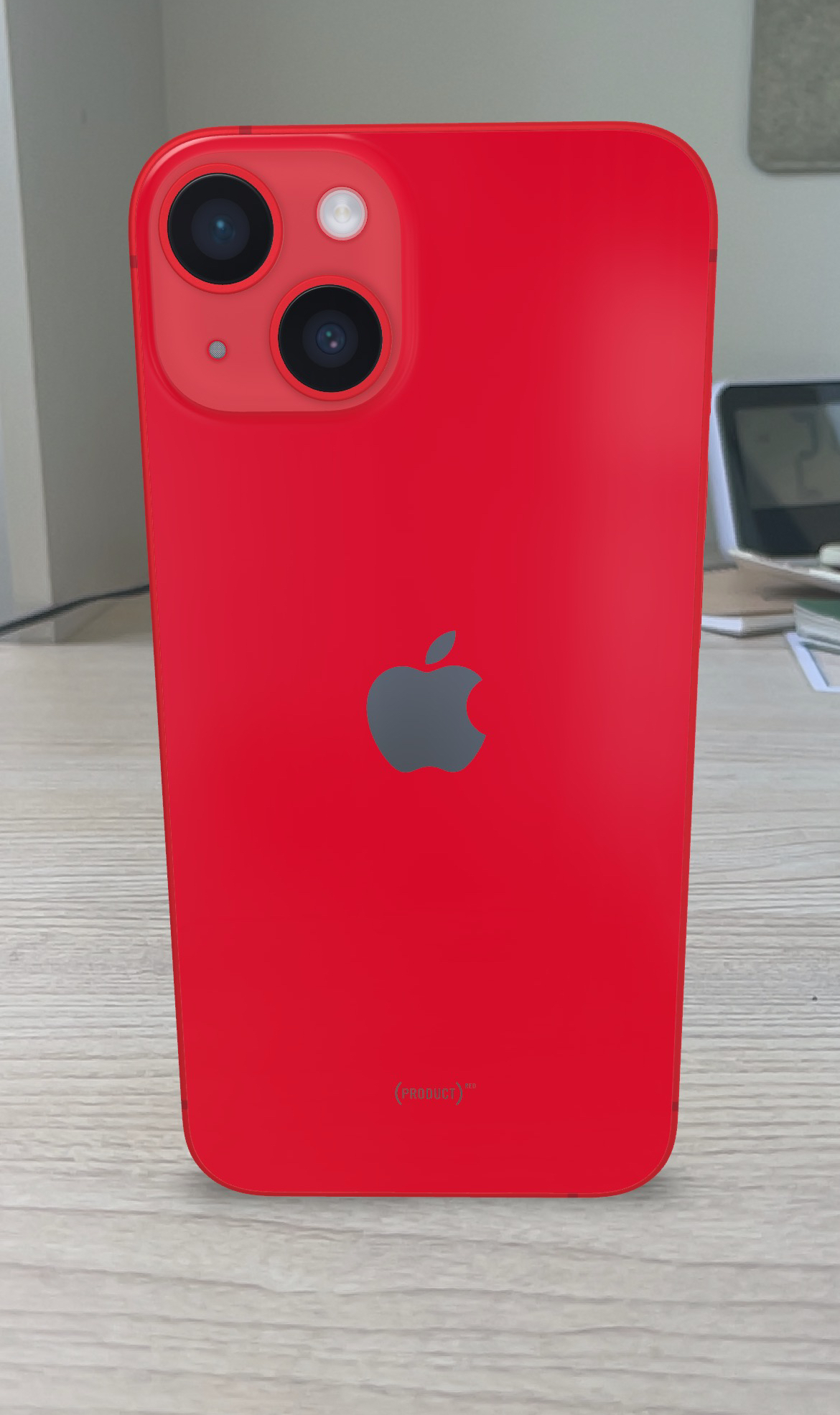
- Product Red edition of the iPhone 14
- Product type: Brand
- Current owner: Red (One Campaign)
- Introduced: 20 January 2006; 20 years ago
- Markets: Worldwide
- Website: red.org

Logo of the company Red

Product Red (Note: Stylized as (PRODUCT)^{RED} or (PRODUCT)RED) is a licensed brand by the company Red (Note: Stylized as (RED)) that seeks to engage the private sector in raising awareness and funds to help eliminate HIV/AIDS in eight African countries, namely Eswatini, Ghana, Kenya, Lesotho, Rwanda, South Africa, Tanzania, and Zambia. It is licensed to partner companies including Nike, American Express (UK), Converse, Electronic Arts, Primark, Head, Buckaroo, Penguin Classics (UK & International), Gap, Armani, Hallmark (US), SAP, and Supercell.

The concept was founded in 2006 by U2 frontman and activist Bono, together with Bobby Shriver of the One Campaign and DATA. The Global Fund to Fight AIDS, Tuberculosis and Malaria is the recipient of Product Red's money.

As part of a new business model, each partner company creates a product with the Product Red logo. In return for the opportunity to increase revenue through the Product Red license, up to 50% of profits gained by each partner is donated to the Global Fund. Such an amalgamation of humanitarian aid and for-profit businesses is one example of "ethical consumerism". In 2012, One Campaign acquired Red as a division of One. Both organizations were co-founded by Bono and Shriver.

Since 2020, Product Red has been used in the global fund to combat the COVID-19 pandemic.

== The Global Fund ==
Created in 2006, the Global Fund to Fight AIDS, Tuberculosis and Malaria support large-scale prevention, treatment and care programs for these three infectious diseases. Today, ≈30 percent of all international funding for HIV/AIDS-related programs, 50 percent for tuberculosis, and 75 percent for malaria worldwide comes from the Global Fund. The concept of "performance-based funding" is central to the organization and only those grant recipients who can demonstrate measurable and effective results from the monies received will be able to receive continued financing. All of the funds generated by Red partners and events goes to Global Fund programs that provide medical care and support services for people affected by HIV/AIDS in Africa. No overhead is taken by either Red or the Global Fund. Red is the largest private sector donor to the Global Fund, and has generated over $800 million for HIV programs in Africa as of January 2026. In November 2013, Jony Ive and Marc Newson hosted an auction at Sotheby's to raise millions for the fund. The event was attended by major celebrities including Bono, The Edge, Hayden Panettiere, and Courtney Love.

== Products ==
Products include:

- Bugaboo International. A design company that makes pushchairs for infants and toddlers. Bugaboo contributes 1% of its total revenue to The Global Fund.
- American Express Red card. Launched in 2006. 1% of spending is donated to the Global Fund.
- Gap sells a line of merchandise including T-shirts, jackets, scarves, gloves, jewelry, bags, and purses. Gap donates 50% of all Product Red profits directly to the Global Fund.
- Converse is selling a shoe made from African mud cloth.
- Giorgio Armani has announced a line of Emporio Armani products that include clothes, jewelry, perfume, and accessories. 40 percent of the gross profit goes to the Global Fund.
- Motorola has announced special editions of their Slvr, Krzr and Razr mobile phones, with a 50% profit of each purchase going to the Global Fund.
- Canon released a version of their SD990 camera along with a leather case in 2008/2009. Only 500 were produced.
- The Independent published a special issue in 2006, in collaboration with Product Red, and 50% of its revenue was donated to the Global Fund.
- The Hotel Café tour is presented by MySpace and Product Red.
- Apple released a special edition iPod Touch 5th generation with a Product Red theme. Subsequently, they have released several Product Red devices and accessories. On 29 October 2013, Apple created and donated a one-of-a-kind Red Mac Pro computer, which was auctioned by Sotheby's at the Red Auction on 23 November 2013 for $977,000 (Sotheby's had estimated it would bring $40,000–60,000). A one-of-a-kind pair of solid gold Apple EarPods were auctioned for $461,000. Apple sold a Product Red iPhone XR and claims to have donated almost $250 million to the Global Fund. The iPhone 11, iPhone SE (2nd generation), iPhone 12, iPhone 13, iPhone SE (3rd generation), and iPhone 14 all have red colors as part of Product Red. As of October 2026, Apple has not made any further Product Red devices.
- Nike has released a special line of red shoelaces, with the profit going to the charity. Their motto is "Lace up, save lives."
- Hallmark has introduced greeting cards that are Product Red.
- In a partnership with Microsoft, Dell announced that it would manufacture versions of its computers (XPS One, XPS M1530, and XPS M1330) that would come with a Product Red version of Windows Vista Ultimate preinstalled. The company also released a Product Red printer.
  - Microsoft would later release the Product Red version of Windows Vista Ultimate as a standalone product.
- Girl Skateboard Company released a two-part deck series with a Product Red graphic. A share of the profit goes to the charities.
- Starbucks participated during their 2008 holiday promotion. For every beverage bought on December 1 (World AIDS Day), 5 pennies went to Product Red. Starbucks also offers the Red Card, and donates five pennies every time the card is used.
- American rock band the Killers released yearly Christmas songs from 2006 to 2016, with 10 original songs and a cover of "I'll Be Home for Christmas". A compilation album of all their Christmas singles called Don't Waste Your Wishes was released in November 2016, in aid of Red. One hundred percent of profits from the album are given to the charity.
- Monster Cable made special edition of Beats by Dr. Dre Solo HD with name Solo HD Product Red.
- Carolina Bucci has created a special edition of her gold and silk Lucky bracelets. 50 percent of the profit goes directly to the Global Fund.
- Tourneau created two special edition watches, with 15% of the retail price contributed to The Global Fund to Fight AIDS, Tuberculosis and Malaria.
- Belvedere Vodka produces special edition Product Red bottles which is designed by South African Artist, Esther Mahlangu. A portion of the proceeds go to Product Red.
- Head produces special Red tennis bags as part of the Product Red project.
- In 2014, U2 released a charity single "Invisible", and a Super Bowl commercial to announce the partnership between Red and Bank of America.
- From November 24 to December 7, 2014, some iOS games, such as PewDiePie's Tuber Simulator, Angry Birds, Cut the Rope 2, The Sims FreePlay, and Clash of Clans partnered with Product Red. During this time, 100% of revenue from microtransactions was donated to the Global Fund.
- In 2017, Amazon created a Red limited edition of the Echo speaker to support the Global Fund. In November 2020 a newer version of Echo Product Red was revealed.

== Criticism ==
Product Red has been widely criticized for not having an effect proportional to the advertising investment, for being much less efficient than direct charitable contribution, and for having a lack of transparency with regards to the amount of money going to charity as a percentage of every purchase. Some critics argue that a retail middleman between donor and charity is unnecessary; donors should just give.

For example, some argued that Gap's website encouraged consumption of the products, thus encouraging companies to use the product for publicity rather than social responsibility. While Product Red has helped give funds and attention to the problem, it does not form a relationship between the donors and recipients. Scholars argue that this sacrifices the purpose of movements such as Product Red. Jessica Wirgau, a professor at Virginia Tech stated, "Red not only misses the opportunity to promote civic engagement with its audience but also ... gives corporations the power to decide which causes should be supported and to what degree."

Another critique is that Product Red's expansion into traditional fundraising techniques, such as art auctions, undermines its claim to be a different and more sustainable approach to raising money for AIDS. Other critics have pointed out that its emphasis on funding treatment for AIDS sufferers meant that large amounts of the money will ultimately end up with pharmaceutical companies "unwilling to distribute their drugs for free". Many accuse the campaign of profiting by using diseases as a marketing vehicle, for being "cause branding" rather than corporate social responsibility. In the Stanford Social Innovation Review, Mark Rosenman wrote that it was an "example of the corporate world aligning its operations with its central purpose of increasing shareholder profit, except this time it is being cloaked in the patina of philanthropy."

The National Labor Committee for Worker and Human Rights criticized Product Red for its links with Gap, which was historically a target of anti-sweatshop activists, although anti-sweatshop organization Labour Behind the Label states that Gap has "come further than many" clothing companies to counter exploitation. Gap's Product Red clothes are made in Lesotho rather than China, going beyond the requirements of Product Red. Labour Behind the Label criticized Product Red for not requiring more measures to protect the rights of the workers who make their products.

Data released in 2007 by Advertising Age claimed retail participants in Product Red including Gap, Motorola and Apple had invested $100 million in advertising and raised only $18 million for The Global Fund. In July 2010, however, Red claimed to have raised over $150 million.

In an attempt to combat the critics, particularly regarding Product Red's Transparency, around 2008, they implemented a calculator to show consumers how many doses of treatment would be received with the purchase of a Red Product. With this, some have stated that "the campaign offers the illusion of activism without requiring behavioral changes or political engagement". While these critics show that there are negative aspects of this program, they also state that "it finds a way to generate something positive out of the currently existent system".

== Timeline ==
Launch Date	Product Type	Partner	Product Name	Description	Amount donated to Global Fund (US$)
January 26, 2006	Launch	WEF	Announcement	Product Red initiative first announced at the World Economic Forum in Davos, Switzerland. The Global Fund identifies Rwanda as the first country to receive funding from Product Red.	
March 1, 2006	Credit card	American Express	American Express Red	American Express Red card launched in the UK. Only UK residents with UK bank accounts are eligible.	1% of total spend. Up to 1.25% after spend over £5,000.
March 15, 2006	Clothing	Gap	Gap Red	Launch party in London for the Gap line with 22 page feature in the April issue of Dazed & Confused magazine.	50% of profits from sales of Product Red items
April 3, 2006	Fashion accessory	Giorgio Armani	Emporio Armani sunglasses	Metal wrap-around sunglasses (style EA 9285/S) launched worldwide. Available in green, rose, blue, smoke grey, grey and brown, all embossed with the Emporio Armani Red logo. The forked frame arms, available in shades of ruthenium, gunmetal and light gold, are superimposed on the single lenses.	40% of gross profit margin from sales of all Emporio Armani Red products directly to the Global Fund.
April 3, 2006	Shoes	Converse	Mudcloth shoes	Converse Product Red limited edition Mudcloth trainers, designed by Giles Deacon, are available in the UK and US.	5 - 15% of net wholesale price
May 15, 2006	Mobile phone	Motorola	Red Motorola Slvr	Red Motorola Slvr L7 launches in the UK	£10 & 5% of every bill
May 15, 2006	Newspaper	The Independent			
August 2006	Fashion watches	Giorgio Armani	Emporio Armani watch	Giorgio Armani's second Red product is an Emporio Armani unisex watch (style AR0537/AR0538). It features a large 43 mm stainless steel case with a coin-ridged bezel, a leather strap available in black with red contrast stitching, or vice versa, and steel rivets that secure the strap to the case. The large digital dial displays the time in oversized numerals and has calendar, chronograph and timer features with push button controls on the side of the case. The dial also features the Emporio Armani Red logo at 12 o'clock printed onto the dial's outer ring.	40% of gross profit margin (see sunglasses)
September 21, 2006	Newspaper	The Independent		The Independent printed its second Product Red special edition, guest-designed by Giorgio Armani. This Red edition includes articles from a host of public figures and celebrities including George Clooney, Bill Gates, Leonardo DiCaprio and Beyoncé. The newspaper's daily features section, Extra, is a 36-page magazine for the day and each paper comes with a free Kate Moss poster. All revenue from online sales will be donated to help fight AIDS in Africa.	All revenue from online sales.
October 13, 2006	MP3 player	Apple	iPod Nano Product Red Special Edition	Red iPod Nano which is only available at the Apple Store and the Apple Store website.	$10
November 2006	Mobile phone	Motorola	Red Motorola Razr	US Cellular launched the Red Motorola Razr in the United States	$17
December 5, 2006	Song	The Killers (Band)	"A Great Big Sled"	The popular indie rock band The Killers release their first annual Christmas single in support of the red campaign. Their singles were combined into the album Don't Waste Your Wishes in 2016.	
January 9, 2007	Stored-value card	Apple	iTunes Product Red Gift Card	Gift card for purchases at Apple's iTunes online store, for movies, TV shows or music. Currently only available in the US at Apple's online store.	10% ($2.50)
June 2007	Magazine	Vanity Fair		Bono edits the issue of the magazine, title "The Africa Issue", which features a wide array of celebrities dedicated to issues in Africa (including Barack Obama, Muhammad Ali, Queen Rania Al-Abdullah, Bono, Condoleezza Rice, President George W. Bush, Archbishop Desmond Tutu, Brad Pitt, Djimon Hounsou, Madonna, Maya Angelou, Chris Rock, Warren Buffett, Bill Gates, Melinda Gates, Oprah Winfrey, George Clooney, Jay-Z, Alicia Keys, Iman Abdulmajid, and Don Cheadle.) on a total of twenty different covers.	$5 of every subscription to Vanity Fair sold.
September 7, 2007	MP3 player	Apple	iPod Nano, iPod shuffle Product Red Special Edition	Red iPod Nano was available with the 1GB and 2GB iPod Shuffle, and the 8GB and 16GB iPod Nano. They were only available at the Apple Store, and Apple Store website.	$10 (Nano)
January 24, 2008	Computers/Operating system	Dell Inc. + Microsoft Corporation	XPS One, XPS 1330, XPS 1530, and AIO 948 Printer Product Red Special Edition; All computers include Windows Vista Ultimate Red	Red is available with the XPS One (80 dollar donation), XPS 1330 (50 dollar donation), XPS 1530 (50 dollar donation), and the AIO 948 (5 dollar donation)	80.00, 50.00, or 5.00
November 11, 2008	MP3 player	Apple	iPod Nano Product Red Special Edition	Apple announces new iPod Nano 4th generation Product Red	N/A
November 27, 2008	Beverages	Starbucks	Starbucks Red Exclusive beverages	Product Red exclusive beverages consisted of Starbucks holiday beverage options including Peppermint Mocha Twist, Gingersnap Latte, and Espresso Truffle	$0.05 from every Starbucks Red Exclusive beverage sold through January 9, 2009
November 30, 2009	Shoelaces	Nike	Nike Red laces	Red shoelaces with the slogan "Lace Up. Save Lives." Sponsored by footballers Didier Drogba (Chelsea F.C.), Joe Cole (Liverpool F.C.), Andrey Arshavin (Arsenal F.C.), Denílson (Arsenal F.C.), Marco Materazzi (Inter Milan), Lucas Neill (Galatasaray), Clint Dempsey (Fulham F.C.) and Seol Ki-Hyeon (Fulham F.C.)	100%
May 20, 2010	Books	Penguin Books	Penguin Classics Red	Penguin Classics published a set of eight classic novels: The House of Mirth by Edith Wharton, The Turn of the Screw by Henry James, The Secret Agent by Joseph Conrad, Great Expectations by Charles Dickens, Notes from Underground by Fyodor Dostoyevsky, Dracula by Bram Stoker, Anna Karenina by Leo Tolstoy and Thérèse Raquin by Émile Zola.	50% of profits
December 7, 2011	MP3 player	Apple	iPod Nano Product Red Special Edition	Apple announced an iPod Nano 6th generation Product Red, available only through Apple's website or an official Apple Store.	$13.20
December 7, 2011	iPad Smart Cover	Apple	iPad Smart Cover Product Red Special Edition	Apple announced the Red Leather iPad Smart cover was to be a part of Product Red.	$4.80
August 14, 2012	iPhone Bumper	Apple	iPhone Bumper Product Red Special Edition	Apple announced the Red iPhone Bumper was to be a part of Product Red.	$2
September 1, 2012	Alcohol	Belvedere (vodka)	Limited Edition Product Red Bottle		50% of profits
September 12, 2012	MP3 player	Apple	iPod shuffle Product Red Special Edition	2 GB iPod Shuffle exclusive to the Apple Store and Apple Store website.	$4.80
October 15, 2012	MP3 player	Apple	iPod Touch Product Red Special Edition	Apple announces an iPod Touch 5th generation Product Red available only through Apple's website or an official Apple Store.	$13.20 (64 GB)
February 2014	Card reader	Square, Inc.	Squa(Red) Reader	Square releases a special edition card reader, available on the Square website.	$9.72
2014	Guitar	Gretsch	Gretsch Red Bono Edition Electromatic Guitar	Bono signature edition of the Gretsch G5623.	5% profit
July 15, 2015	MP3 Player	Apple	iPod Touch (6th generation) Product Red	Apple announces the iPod touch 6th generation, with a Product Red colour option.	N/A
November 18, 2016	Album	The Killers	"Don't Waste Your Wishes"	The Killers released a compilation of their annual Christmas singles featuring; Elton John, Neil Tennant, Dawes, Ryan Pardey, Toni Halliday, and Jimmy Kimmel.	
March 24, 2017	Smartphone	Apple	iPhone 7 and 7 Plus - Product Red (Special Edition)	Apple announces the Special Edition Product Red iPhone 7 and iPhone 7 Plus, available through Apple's website, Apple Stores, and other mobile carriers and retailers that carry the iPhone.	In 2017, Apple gave $30 million to the Global Fund through (Product)Red including from the Sale of iPhone 7 and iPhone 7 plus (Special Edition)
April 13, 2018	Smartphone	Apple	iPhone 8 and 8 Plus Product Red Special Edition	Apple announces the Special Edition Product Red iPhone 8 and iPhone 8 Plus, available through Apple's website, Apple Stores, and other mobile carriers and retailers that carry the iPhone.	N/A
October 26, 2018	Mobile phone	Apple	iPhone XR Product Red	Apple announces the iPhone XR, with a Product Red color option.	N/A
May 28, 2019	MP3 Player	Apple	iPod Touch (7th generation) Product Red	Apple announces the iPod touch 7th generation, with a Product Red colour option.	N/A
September 20, 2019	Mobile phone	Apple	iPhone 11 Product Red	Apple announces the iPhone 11, with a Product Red color option.	N/A
2019	Robot	Piaggio fast forward	(gita)RED		N/A
April 24, 2020	Mobile phone	Apple	iPhone SE (2nd generation) Product Red	Apple announces the second generation iPhone SE. One of the available colors is a Product Red edition.	N/A
September 18, 2020	Smartwatch	Apple	Apple Watch Series 6	Apple announces the Apple Watch Series 6, with a Product Red color option.	N/A
October 23, 2020	Mobile phone	Apple	iPhone 12	Apple announces the iPhone 12, with a Product Red color option.	N/A
November 13, 2020	Mobile phone	Apple	iPhone 12 Mini	Apple announces the iPhone 12 Mini, with a Product Red color option.	N/A
September 24, 2021	Mobile phone	Apple	iPhone 13 / 13 Mini	Apple announces the iPhone 13 and 13 Mini, with a Product Red color option.	N/A
October 15, 2021	Smartwatch	Apple	Apple Watch Series 7	Apple announces the Apple Watch Series 7, with a Product Red color option.	N/A
March 18, 2022; 4 years ago	Mobile phone	Apple	iPhone SE (3rd generation) Product Red	Apple announces the third generation iPhone SE. One of the available colors is a Product Red edition.	N/A
September 16, 2022; 4 years ago	Smartwatch	Apple	Apple Watch Series 8	Apple announces the Apple Watch Series 8, with a Product Red case and strap option.	N/A
September 16, 2022; 4 years ago	Mobile phone	Apple	iPhone 14	Apple announces the iPhone 14, with a Product Red color option.	N/A
October 7, 2022; 4 years ago	Mobile phone	Apple	iPhone 14 Plus	Apple announces the iPhone 14 Plus, with a Product Red color option.	N/A
September 12, 2023; 3 years ago	Smartwatch	Apple	Apple Watch Series 9	Apple announces the Apple Watch Series 9, with a Product Red color option.	N/A
January 21, 2025	Soccer jersey	Manchester United F.C.	Manchester United Home Jersey	Manchester United announces that they will play a game on May 10, 2025, with a Product Red logo on their jersey.	

== See also ==
- The Lazarus Effect
- Cause marketing

== Sources ==
- Tim Weber (2006). "Bono bets on Red to battle Aids". BBC. Retrieved February 26, 2006.
- Motorola Press Release Retrieved May 15, 2006.
