= A Great Big Sled =

Single by The Killers featuring Toni Halliday
- Released: December 5, 2006
- Recorded: November 2006
- Studio: British Grove Studios (Chiswick, England)
- Genre: Rock; holiday music
- Length: 4:15
- Label: Island – ISLR 16690-2
- Songwriters: Brandon Flowers; Dave Keuning; Mark Stoermer; Ronnie Vannucci Jr.
- Producers: Alan Moulder; The Killers

The Killers singles chronology
| "Bones" (2006) | "A Great Big Sled" (2006) | "Read My Mind" (2007) |

Music video
- "A Great Big Sled" on YouTube

"A Great Big Sled" is a song by Las Vegas-based rock band The Killers. It was recorded in mid-November 2006 with record producer Alan Moulder as a one-off track and the band's Christmas 2006 single. Moulder's wife Toni Halliday, the former lead vocalist of Curve, features on backing vocals.

The song was released December 5, 2006, as a download from the iTunes Store. All of the proceeds from this song went to AIDS charities as part of Bono's RED campaign. A music video was released for the single, containing "candid" clips of the band members participating in various holiday celebration.

== Chart performance ==
"A Great Big Sled" entered the UK Official Download Chart the week of December 18, 2006 at number 11. The song also charted in the Billboard Hot 100 at number 54.

== Track listing ==
=== CD: Island / ISLR 16690-2 ===
1. "A Great Big Sled" – 4:15
- US promo CD

== Charts ==
| Chart (2006) | Peak position |
|---|---|
| UK Download Chart | 11 |
| US Billboard Hot 100 | 54 |
