= The World We Live In (song) =

Single by The Killers

from the album Day & Age
- B-side: "Joy Ride - Night Version"
- Released: May 18, 2009
- Recorded: 2008
- Genre: Synth-pop
- Length: 4:40
- Label: Island
- Songwriters: Brandon Flowers; Dave Keuning; Mark Stoermer; Ronnie Vannucci Jr.
- Producers: Stuart Price; The Killers

The Killers singles chronology
| "Joseph, Better You than Me" (2008) | "The World We Live In" (2009) | "A Dustland Fairytale" (2009) |

Music video
- "The World We Live In" on YouTube

"The World We Live In" is a song by American rock band The Killers, taken from the band's third studio album Day & Age (2008), it was released as the third single in the UK and Europe. In North America and the rest of the world, "A Dustland Fairytale" is the third single.

== Music video ==
The video was directed by Danny Drysdale, who also directed the music video "Human" from the same album. It was shot in Banff, Alberta, Canada in April 2009 and was premiered on MTV Two on May 15, 2009.

A book in the video titled The Wilder side of Gold and Glitz is taken from a lyric from "Neon Tiger".

== TV performances ==
On May 29, The Killers performed "The World We Live In" on UK TV show Friday Night with Jonathan Ross. They also performed "Human" and an impromptu "Mr. Brightside" and "When You Were Young". Frontman Brandon Flowers was also interviewed.

In July 2009, the song was used by ITV4 in their closing montage of coverage of the Tour de France 2009.

On September 8, 2009, the song was heard in the closing montage of the series premiere of Melrose Place.

== Track listing ==
1. "The World We Live In" - 4:40
2. "Joy Ride - Night Version" - 7:16 (free download with 7" vinyl)

== Chart performance ==
| Chart (2009) | Peak position |
|---|---|
| Mexico Ingles Airplay (Billboard) | 39 |
| Netherlands (Dutch Top 40 Tipparade) | 2 |
| Slovakia Airplay (ČNS IFPI) | 78 |
| Switzerland Airplay (Schweizer Hitparade) | 58 |
| UK Singles (The Official Charts Company) | 82 |

== Release history ==
| Region | Date | Format | Label |
|---|---|---|---|
| Worldwide | November 23, 2008 | Digital download | Island Records |
| Europe | June 19, 2009 | Digital EP | Island Records |
| United Kingdom | May 18, 2009 | 7 inch vinyl | Mercury Records |
