= Big Talk =

Big Talk may refer to:

- Big Talk (band), an American rock band formed in 2011
  - Big Talk (album), their 2011 debut album
- Big Talk (song), a 1989 song by Warrant
- Big Talk Studios, a British film and television production company
- Big Talk, a song by Azealia Banks, from the mixtape Slay-Z
