= Spaceman (The Killers song) =

2008 single by the Killers

Single by the Killers

from the album Day & Age
- B-side: "Tidal Wave"; "Four Winds"
- Released: November 4, 2008
- Genre: Alternative rock; new wave
- Length: 4:44 (album version); 4:13 (radio edit)
- Label: Island, Vertigo
- Songwriters: Brandon Flowers; Dave Keuning; Mark Stoermer; Ronnie Vannucci Jr.
- Producers: Stuart Price; The Killers

The Killers singles chronology
"Human" (2008)	"Spaceman" (2008)	"Joseph, Better You than Me" (2008)

Music video
- "Spaceman" on YouTube

"Spaceman" is a song by the Killers. The song was released as the second single from the band's third studio album Day & Age on November 4, 2008, as a digital download on iTunes, and as 7" and promo CD in the US, Canada and the UK. It has been released to radio in Australia and has gone into regular rotation on Triple J. This song was number 17 on Rolling Stone's list of the 100 Best Songs of 2008. The song has been used regularly as the opening song during the band's tour.

== Live performances ==
The group began performing the song at shows during their summer 2008 tour and played it as part of a two-song set on the October 4, 2008, episode of Saturday Night Live. On November 4, 2008, they also performed the song on BBC2's Later... with Jools Holland.

== Popular culture ==
The song was featured in the Fringe episode "The No-Brainer", as well as on the trailer of the animated film Planet 51 starring Dwayne "The Rock" Johnson. The song was also released as a downloadable track for the music video game series Rock Band on November 25, 2008.

== Radio performance ==
In the Los Angeles market, "Spaceman" was a big radio hit, with radio-airplay longevity into 2010. On KYSR 98.7 FM, it was their #1 most-played song in June 2010, while KROQ 106.7 FM added the song back into regular rotation in May 2010 due to its regional popularity.

== Music video ==
The music video was directed by American director Ray Tintori, and shows Brandon Flowers walking around a party in progress, happening on a unique tiered structure adorned with long white vertical lights. Many humanoid creatures (all dressed up in very colourful, carnival-like costumes) are dancing, occasionally as a group, but usually individually. The other three band members can also be seen at the party throughout the video. As more of the structure is revealed, it can be seen that it is in the middle of a wide open space, surrounded by the camera crew filming the video.

== Track listing ==
Promo CD

1. "Spaceman" (radio edit) – 4:13
2. "Spaceman" (album version) – 4:44

UK 7" Picture Disc

1. "Spaceman" – 4:44
2. "Tidal Wave" – 4:14

Limited Edition 12" Picture Disc

1. "Spaceman" – 4:44
2. "Four Winds" (Conor Oberst) – 3:56

German CD/German iTunes EP

1. "Spaceman" - 4:44
2. "Four Winds" (Conor Oberst) - 3:56
3. "Tidal Wave" - 4:14

Promo Remix CD

1. "Spaceman" (Bimbo Jones vocal mix) – 8:04
2. "Spaceman" (Bimbo Jones dub) – 8:03
3. "Spaceman" (Bimbo Jones radio edit) – 4:33

Promo Remix CD 2

1. "Spaceman" (Bimbo Jones Radio Mix) – 04:33
2. "Spaceman" (Bimbo Jones Vocal Mix) – 08:05
3. "Spaceman" (Lee Dagger Club Mix) – 09:03
4. "Spaceman" (Max Jackson Dub) – 06:26
5. "Spaceman" (Sander van Doorn Remix Part 1) – 06:38
6. "Spacemen" (Sander van Doorn Remix Part 2) – 07:39
7. "Spaceman" (Tiësto Remix) - 7:07

== Chart performance ==
"Spaceman" debuted on the Billboard Hot 100 at number 67 on November 22, 2008. The song fell off the chart the following week. On Sunday 16 February 2009, "Spaceman" finally broke into the UK Top 40 at number 40.

== Charts ==
=== Weekly charts ===
Chart (2008–2009)	Peak position
Australia (ARIA)	62
Austria (Ö3 Austria Top 40)	44
Belgium (Ultratip Bubbling Under Flanders)	6
Canada Hot 100 (Billboard)	47
Canada Rock (Billboard)	30
Germany (GfK)	29
Ireland (IRMA)	33
Israel International Airplay (Media Forest)	6
Mexico Ingles Airplay (Billboard)	5
Netherlands (Dutch Top 40)	22
Netherlands (Single Top 100)	57
Slovakia Airplay (ČNS IFPI)	49
Switzerland (Schweizer Hitparade)	89
UK Singles (OCC)	40
US Billboard Hot 100	67
US Adult Alternative Airplay (Billboard)	17
US Alternative Airplay (Billboard)	8
US Dance Club Songs (Billboard)	2

=== Year-end charts ===
Chart (2009)	Position
US Dance Club Songs (Billboard)	18

== Certifications ==
Region	Certification	Certified units/sales
Australia (ARIA)	Platinum	70,000^{‡}
Canada (Music Canada)	Gold	40,000^{‡}
United Kingdom (BPI)	Gold	400,000^{‡}
United States (RIAA)	Gold	500,000^{‡}
^{‡} Sales+streaming figures based on certification alone.

== Release history ==
Region	Date	Format	Label
North America	November 4, 2008	Digital download	Island Records
Worldwide	November 23, 2008	Digital download	Island Records
United Kingdom	February 9, 2009	7 inch vinyl	Island Records
Europe	March 27, 2009	CD and digital EP	Island Records
North America	April 12, 2009	12 inch vinyl	Island Records
