= A Dustland Fairytale =

Single by The Killers

Single by The Killers

from the album Day & Age
- B-side: "Forget About What I Said"
- Released: May 9, 2009
- Recorded: 2008
- Genre: Heartland rock
- Length: 3:45
- Label: Island
- Songwriters: Brandon Flowers; Dave Keuning; Mark Stoermer; Ronnie Vannucci, Jr.
- Producers: Stuart Price; The Killers

The Killers singles chronology
"The World We Live In" (2009)	"A Dustland Fairytale" (2009)	"¡Happy Birthday Guadalupe!" (2009)

Music video
- "A Dustland Fairytale" on YouTube

"A Dustland Fairytale" is a song by American rock band The Killers, released as the fourth single from the band's third studio album, Day & Age (2008). The Killers performed the song live on The Late Show with David Letterman accompanied by an orchestra in 2009.

The song's lyrics focus upon frontman Brandon Flowers' parents, referring to "Cinderella" (his mother) and a "slick chrome American prince" (his father).

== Background ==
In 2013, vocalist Brandon Flowers noted that the track's lyrical content and aesthetic is similar to that of the band's previous studio album, Sam's Town: "["A Dustland Fairytale"] is me not being completely able to let go of Sam's Town! I wanted to - I wanted to go in a new direction, and there were a lot of new sounds on Day & Age, but on that song, I was really holding onto the last record. I still love Sam's Town, and you can really hear it in the words and sentiment of that song. It's more like an extension of Sam's Town, and not a reaction to it. It's one of the more personal narratives I've written, and it seems like the more personal I get, the more the fans respond and grow attached to the song."

== Artwork ==
The cover art for the single is a portrait of the band's bassist Mark Stoermer, and is one of the four portraits drawn by Paul Normansell for the album.

== Track listing ==
UK 7" picture disc

1. "A Dustland Fairytale" – 3:45
2. "Forget About What I Said" – 2:57

UK digital EP

1. "A Dustland Fairytale" – 3:45
2. "A Dustland Fairytale" (video) – 5:09

== Chart performance ==
In December 2008, "A Dustland Fairytale" charted in the UK Top 200 on album track downloads alone, at number 158, in the week of its official release it re-entered at 137.

Chart (2009)	Peak position
UK Singles Chart	137
US Billboard Alternative Songs	36

== Music video ==
The video was directed by Anthony Mandler who also directed Killers videos for "Tranquilize" and "When You Were Young". It was released on US iTunes on June 8, 2009.

The video premiered in the UK on June 16 on Channel 4 and 4Music.

The video's style references the cult classic movie The Outsiders. The video starts with an old man named Joe White, smoking with a tattoo of the number 7 on one of his fingers. It then reflects on a younger man, "Joey", showing the same 7 on the finger, dressed in a leather jacket, white shirt and leather pants and about to fight a member of another gang, "Billy", for his own gang, the "Sevens". Throughout the video, it shows the boy, Joey, dating a brunette girl, then there is a flashback of Joey looking at the brunette girl through her window, while it shows the older man going to all the locations shown, reflecting on the memories of his youth. Interspersed with this is a letter that the man has, showing that he has just been released from prison, which gives a clue to the result of the initial fight—he kills Billy. The final shot is of an older Joe visiting a house, ringing the doorbell to find an older brunette woman answer the door, and they embrace.

== Release history ==
The song was released as the third single from the band's third studio album Day & Age in North America. In the UK, Europe and Australia, the third single released was "The World We Live In".

Region	Date	Format	Label
Worldwide	November 23, 2008	Digital download	Island Records
North America	June 9, 2009	Video download	Island Def Jam
United Kingdom	August 9, 2009	Digital EP	Mercury Records
United Kingdom	August 10, 2009	7 inch vinyl	Mercury Records

== 2021 version ==
"Dustland"

Single by The Killers featuring Bruce Springsteen
- Released: June 21, 2021
- Recorded: 2021
- Genre: Heartland rock
- Length: 4:25
- Label: Island
- Songwriters: Brandon Flowers; Dave Keuning; Mark Stoermer; Ronnie Vannucci, Jr.

The Killers singles chronology
"Dying Breed" (2020)	"Dustland" (2021)	"Boy" (2022)

Bruce Springsteen singles chronology
"I’ll See You in My Dreams" (2021)	"Dustland" (2021)	"Do I Love You (Indeed I Do)" (2022)

Music video
- "Dustland" on YouTube

A recording released on June 16, 2021, under the shortened name "Dustland" features Bruce Springsteen singing in the second verse, both choruses and the bridge, while Brandon Flowers sings in the first and second verse, along with the second chorus and bridge. The Killers, alongside Springsteen, performed "Dustland" live on October 1, 2022, at Madison Square Garden, and the performance was later released on Encore at the Garden.

=== Charts ===
Chart (2021)	Peak position
New Zealand Hot Singles (RMNZ)	37
US Hot Rock & Alternative Songs (Billboard)	44
US Digital Song Sales (Billboard)	47
