= Goodnight, Travel Well =

2008 song by the Killers

Song by the Killers

from the album Day & Age
- Released: November 18, 2008
- Recorded: 2008
- Studio: Battle Born (Las Vegas)
- Genre: Alternative rock; indie rock
- Length: 6:51
- Label: Island
- Songwriters: Brandon Flowers; Dave Keuning; Mark Stoermer; Ronnie Vannucci Jr.
- Producers: Stuart Price; the Killers

Music video
- "Goodnight, Travel Well" on YouTube

“Goodnight, Travel Well” is a song by American rock band the Killers. It is the tenth and closing track on the band's third studio album, Day & Age (2008). The song, which is the longest in the Killers' discography, was written by Brandon Flowers, Dave Keuning, Mark Stoermer, and Ronnie Vannucci Jr., and produced by Stuart Price and the Killers. In partnership with UNICEF and MTV EXIT, a music video for the song was released on July 13, 2009.

== Background ==
"Goodnight, Travel Well" was written as a tribute to guitarist Dave Keuning’s late mother, who had died earlier that year, as well as frontman Brandon Flowers' mother, who had recently been diagnosed with a brain tumor. In an interview for the Killers' biography Day & Ages, Keuning remarked: "Brandon chose to write a song about people dying so I guess that adds to it. I really liked the song before it had lyrics. I just thought it was a dark song - it's the only song we have like that. I was disappointed more people didn't say they liked it but I think they expect more fun stuff from us. I thought it was a quality song," with bassist Mark Stoermer recalling how "everyone was aware that Dave and Brandon lost their mothers at the same time, but at the same time Day & Age was an effort to make more of an upbeat poppy album [...] in general everyone knew what was going on but it wasn't talked about, we were moving forward and making this upbeat pop record." Flowers described the song: "It goes from being the darkest thing we've ever done before shooting up to the clouds at the end. Oh, it's a heartbreaker. It just rips your guts out."

The song, which is the longest in the Killers' discography at 6 minutes and 51 seconds, was written by the four members of the Killers, and produced by Stuart Price and the Killers. Drummer Ronnie Vannucci Jr. expressed how he came up with the drum pattern for the song "on-the-spot" to Mix magazine, saying: "I caught a particular drum pattern and I wasn't thinking about it; I was just letting it come out. [...] I listened back, and thought 'Wow, this isn't half bad, and it sounds good, too!'" The song makes use of many different instrumental choices, such as the "ominous, brooding horn section" and the "flurry of crashing cymbals that'll leave you breathless."

== Release and reception ==
"Goodnight, Travel Well" was released alongside the rest of Day & Age on November 18, 2008. Billboard praised the song, proclaiming "from the brooding intro through the epic finale, [the song] would do fine as the sonic climax to some galactic battle scene." Uproxx ranked "Goodnight, Travel Well" at No. 15 on their list of "The Best Songs by The Killers", calling it the "finest spooky album closer in the Killers’ arsenal." Pitchfork called the song an "impressively brooding (and Björk-ish!) closer", while Gigwise noted that "the instrumentation and orchestral arrangement is incredible, rising from a brooding denial to the final euphoric farewell over the titular refrain."

== Music video ==
A music video for "Goodnight, Travel Well", directed by David Slade, was released in partnership with UNICEF and MTV EXIT in an effort to raise awareness about human trafficking. The video, which only features the first two-thirds of the song, features multiple scenes of trafficked women being held captive in a dark room and being sold to other traffickers as prostitutes, with the phrase "some things cost more than we realize" appearing at the end of the video. The video premiered globally on MTV on July 13, 2009, "reaching a potential audience of hundreds of millions of people in 168 countries" according to MTV. In a statement, the Killers said that they "are deeply shocked and appalled that women and children are forced into such exploitative situations" and that the music video will help "millions of people across the world learn about this tragic form of modern-day slavery." Susan Bissell, UNICEF's Head of Child Protection, commented that she sees "this music video as a powerful way to reach out and raise awareness among young people, across borders and across language barriers.”

== In popular culture ==
The song has been featured in many TV series' over the years, including the Smallville episode "Requiem", airing on February 5, 2009, Dominion episode "Bewilderment of Heart", airing on September 17, 2015, and The Originals episode "Wild at Heart", which aired on February 5, 2016.

== Credits and personnel ==
Credits adapted from the liner notes of Day & Age.

=== Studios ===
- Battle Born Studios (Las Vegas) – engineering
- Olympic Studios (London) – mixing
- Metropolis Studios (London) – mastering

=== The Killers ===
- Brandon Flowers
- Dave Keuning
- Mark Stoermer
- Ronnie Vannucci Jr.

=== Technical ===
- Stuart Price – production, mixing
- The Killers – production
- Robert Root – engineering
- Tim Young – mastering
