= The Killers =

American rock band

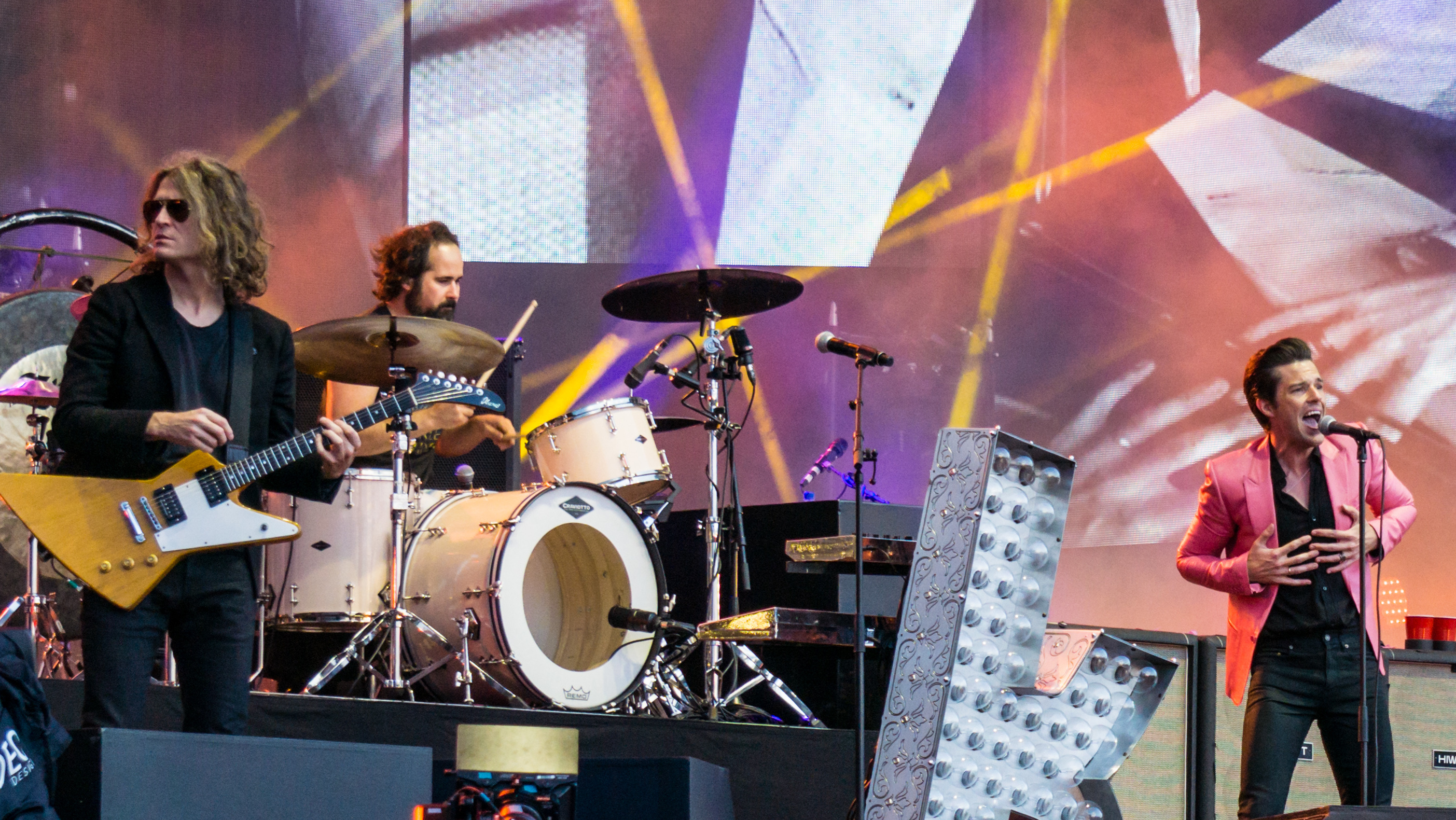
- The Killers in 2017. From left to right: Dave Keuning, Ronnie Vannucci Jr., and Brandon Flowers

Background information
- Origin: Las Vegas, Nevada, U.S.
- Genres: Alternative rock; pop rock; post-punk revival; new wave; heartland rock
- Works: Albums and singles; songs
- Years active: 2001–present
- Labels: Island; Vertigo; Marrakesh; Mercury; Lizard King
- Spinoffs: Big Talk
- Awards: Full list
- Members: Brandon Flowers; Dave Keuning; Ronnie Vannucci Jr.; Mark Stoermer
- Past members: Dell Neal; Matt Norcross; Brian Havens
- Website: thekillersmusic.com

The Killers are an American rock band formed in Las Vegas, Nevada, in 2001 by Brandon Flowers (lead vocals, keyboards, bass) and Dave Keuning (lead guitar, backing vocals). After the band went through several short-term bassists and drummers, Mark Stoermer (bass, rhythm guitar, backing vocals) and Ronnie Vannucci Jr. (drums, percussion) joined in 2002.

The Killers have released seven studio albums, each of which topped the UK Albums Chart: Hot Fuss (2004), Sam's Town (2006), Day & Age (2008), Battle Born (2012), Wonderful Wonderful (2017), Imploding the Mirage (2020), and Pressure Machine (2021). The band have also released three compilation albums: Sawdust (2007), Direct Hits (2013), and Rebel Diamonds (2023), all of which have charted in the top 10 of the UK Albums chart.

The Killers are considered one of the biggest rock bands of the 21st century, selling more than 35 million records worldwide. They have performed in over 50 countries and on six continents, headlining venues such as Madison Square Garden, Wembley Stadium, Glastonbury Festival (2007 and 2019), and Electric Picnic (2023).

== History ==
=== 2001–2003: Origins and formation ===
In 2001, Brandon Flowers was fired by his first band, a synth-pop trio called Blush Response. After attending an Oasis concert at the Hard Rock Hotel during The Tour of Brotherly Love, Flowers realized his calling was to be in a rock band and began searching for like-minded musicians. He eventually came across an ad posted in a Las Vegas newspaper by Dave Keuning, a 25-year-old guitarist who had moved to Las Vegas from Iowa a year earlier. When the pair met in summer 2001, they bonded over similar musical influences and began writing songs together in Keuning's apartment. The first time the duo met, Keuning gave Flowers a four-track tape recording that contained an early riff of "Mr. Brightside". Flowers returned the next time they met with the lyrics and vocal melody for the song. In November 2001, they headed to Kill the Messenger Studio in Henderson, Nevada, along with recently recruited drummer Matt Norcross, to record a demo. They recorded two tracks: "Mr. Brightside" and "Desperate". A month later, they recorded two more, "Under the Gun" and "Replaceable", with Keuning's roommate Dell Neal on bass. The group's name comes from a fictional band in the music video for the New Order song "Crystal", which Flowers was a fan of.

Keuning and Flowers played their first live show together at an open mic night at the Cafe Espresso Roma in Las Vegas in January 2002, where the band was advertised simply as "Killers". The pair, joined by Neal and Norcross, began playing venues around the city where they handed out free copies of their demo. The Killers brought a unique style to the small Vegas music scene, which was dominated by punk, nu metal, and rap bands; one local reviewer wrote, "The Killers, thankfully, don't come across like any other band in town", and described their sound as a mix between the "pop styles of British music and the lo-fi fuzz of modern indie rock". By the summer of 2002, the Killers, whose early live sound was also described as erratic, had fired Norcross and briefly replaced him with Brian Havens, who was also eventually fired. Neal later left the band for personal reasons.

Ronnie Vannucci Jr. began practicing with the Killers shortly before Neal's departure. Vannucci was well known in the Las Vegas music scene, having played in bands such as Attaboy Skip and Expert in October since he was a teenager. He met the Killers in 2002 while he was playing in another local band called Romance Fantasy. Vannucci was initially reluctant to officially join at first, but agreed to once he got to know Flowers and Keuning, who "were crazy [sic] as I was—maybe even crazier" about rehearsals. Vannucci's first show with the band was on August 30, 2002, at a club in Las Vegas called The Junkyard. Filling in on bass that night was Mark Stoermer, who, at the time, was the lead guitarist for local progressive rock band the Negative Ponies. Vannucci had previously played a gig with Stoermer, and the band wanted Stoermer to join them permanently as their second guitarist. They had first approached him when they were considering turning the band into a five-piece, "possibly more like the Strokes, with a keyboard". Stoermer later said he could also play bass. The band continued as a three-piece, trying out other bassists until November 2002, when Stoermer accepted the invitation to join. Ryan Pardey, who booked many of the band's early shows, described them as "a great band when Ronnie and Mark joined. That's when they finally became a cohesive unit. What Ronnie did — he was the discipline — and Mark was just a solid musician."

The band's logo, first used in 2003

While walking through a Virgin Megastore in Las Vegas in 2002, Flowers noticed the album artwork on the then-new Elvis Presley compilation album ELV1S: 30 No. 1 Hits. Inspired to use a marquee sign motif as the band's logo, the band hired Vannucci's roommate's girlfriend to design it, and the logo has been used in the band's branding, releases, promotional materials, and merchandise ever since.

The four members began working on song ideas in Vannucci's garage by the end of 2002. After Vannucci sold his house, they snuck into the band room at the University of Nevada, Las Vegas (where Vannucci was studying classical percussion) at night to practice. Despite most of the members still working day jobs, the group practiced from "midnight to four in the morning" for months. During this period, the band wrote much of its debut album, including the singles "Somebody Told Me" and "Smile Like You Mean It". The band continued playing at small venues around Las Vegas, often playing at the transgender bar Sasha's (later renamed Tramps). After label executives began flocking to Las Vegas to see the Killers perform, the band held a label showcase as Sasha's in May 2003. There, they caught the attention of Braden Merrick, an A&R rep for Warner Bros. Records who had come across their demo on a website dedicated to unsigned bands in the Las Vegas area. After attending a live show, he offered to help the band find a record deal, and eventually became their manager. He took the band to Berkeley, California, to record demos with former Green Day manager Jeff Saltzman. They sent the demo tapes to major U.S. record labels, and the band was invited to perform at a number of showcases but was not signed. The band then caught the eye of Alex Gilbert, an A&R rep from the United Kingdom. Gilbert took a demo with him to the UK and showed it to his friend Ben Durling, who worked at the newly formed independent label Lizard King Records. Despite not meeting the band in person, Lizard King offered the band a deal based on the strength of the five song demo. The Killers signed with Lizard King Records in the summer of 2003.

=== 2003–2005: Hot Fuss ===
On August 19, 2003, the song "Mr. Brightside" premiered on DJ Zane Lowe's BBC Radio 1 show in the UK. The Killers traveled to London the following month to spend a week playing at live music venues across the city. On September 29, 2003, the song "Mr. Brightside" was released in the UK on a limited number of CDs and vinyl records. Critical reviews of both the song and the shows were positive: NME noted the band's retro sound, commenting "The Killers steal so smartly, and with such mind-boggling variety". As a result of the buzz generated in the UK, a number of major labels in the US began showing strong interest in the band and they were invited to play at the ASCAP CMJ Music Marathon in New York City. They eventually signed with the record label Island Def Jam.

The band finished recording Hot Fuss in November 2003 with Jeff Saltzman. They decided to keep many of the previously recorded demos, as they felt they had a spontaneity that re-recordings would not have. Shortly afterwards they returned to London, having been invited to support British Sea Power on their UK tour. The band also worked with Alan Moulder at Eden Studios and Townhouse Studios mixing tracks for their upcoming album. They continued playing support slots during the first half of 2004, including touring both the US & UK with Stellastarr and opening for Morrissey on two occasions. The band filmed their first music video for the Spring 2004 release of "Somebody Told Me" which was to be the band's debut single in the US and second single in the UK. The band's first headline tour started in the UK in May 2004. During the spring and summer of 2004, the group played well-received sets at festivals across Europe and North America.

"All These Things That I've Done"
The anthemic "All These Things That I've Done" with its notable refrain "I've got soul, but I'm not a soldier" became one of the Killers' most well-known songs.

The Killers released their debut album Hot Fuss on June 7, 2004, in the United Kingdom on Lizard King Records and a week later in the United States on Island Records. The track listing differed depending on territory, in the UK and Australia "Glamorous Indie Rock & Roll" replaces "Change Your Mind" as track eight. Upon release, Hot Fuss received generally favorable reviews from critics. Extensive touring and the success of the Grammy Award nominated singles "Somebody Told Me", "All These Things That I've Done" and "Mr. Brightside" led to the album becoming a commercial success. Hot Fuss reached number one in the UK in January 2005, seven months after its release, and has been certified 7× Platinum in both the UK and Ireland. It went on to spend more weeks on the UK Albums chart than any other album that decade, 173 weeks in total. In the US, the album reached its peak position of number seven in April 2005 and has been certified 3× Platinum. It reached the top spot in Australia in March 2005, where it was certified 3× Platinum. It has also been certified 3× Platinum in Canada, Platinum in New Zealand and Gold in Argentina, Belgium, Germany and France. "Mr. Brightside" has been downloaded 3.7 million times in the United States as of July 2017 and certified Diamond.

The Killers were named the World's Best Selling New Group at the 2005 World Music Awards. The same year, they won the MTV Video Music Award for Best New Artist and were also nominated for three Grammy Awards with Hot Fuss being nominated for Best Rock Album. In the UK, they received an NME Award for Best International Band. The band was recognized by Rolling Stone as the "best-selling new rock band of the past year" in June 2005. Lead singer Brandon Flowers had also gained media attention, and while being named both Sexiest and Best Dressed Man at the NME Awards, he had also caused controversy due to some outspoken views on other bands.

In July 2005, the Killers performed on the London stage of the Live 8 concert, playing "All These Things That I've Done". Robbie Williams incorporated the song's refrain "I've got soul but I'm not a soldier" into his own performance. Coldplay and U2 followed suit and, at their separate concerts played in Las Vegas, with the Killers in the crowd, incorporated the line into their songs "God Put a Smile Upon Your Face" and "Beautiful Day", respectively.

The band fired manager Braden Merrick in 2006. Merrick later filed a lawsuit against the band for breach of contract and their new manager and lawyer, Robert Reynolds, for $16 million each. The band counter sued, citing that Merrick's poor management had cost them millions. The case was settled in 2009.

=== 2006–2007: Sam's Town and Sawdust ===
Shortly after finishing touring for Hot Fuss, the Killers headed back into the studio to start recording their second studio album with producers Alan Moulder and Flood, who were working together for the first time in a decade. Sam's Town was mostly recorded at Studio at the Palms in Las Vegas, with finishing touches added to the album at Criterion Studios, London in June 2006. Upon completion of the album, Flowers claimed he felt the band had made "one of the best albums of the past twenty years" and that he wanted the album to capture "everything important that got me to where I am today". In July 2006, the lead single "When You Were Young" was premiered and it became a hit, gaining another two Grammy Award nominations and mostly positive reviews with many bringing attention to the influence of Bruce Springsteen on the song.

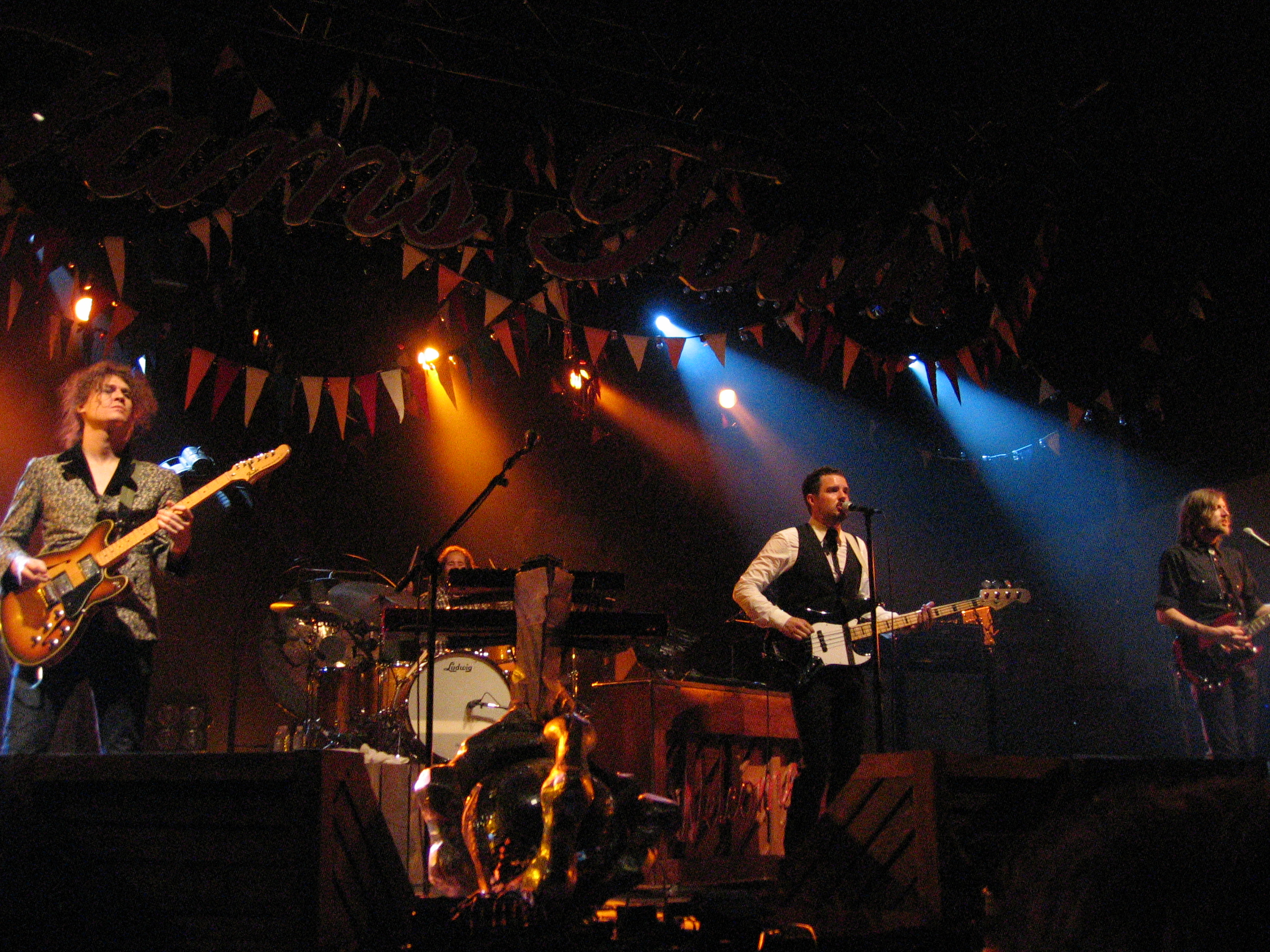
The Killers performing in October 2006

Sam's Town was released in October 2006 under Island Def Jam Music Group. It received a varied response with some critics praising the album and the evolution of the band and others criticizing and mocking it, most notably a scathing review from Rolling Stone. The album sold over 706,000 copies worldwide in the first week of release, reaching number two on the US Billboard 200 chart and number one on the UK chart. The album has since been certified 5× Platinum in the United Kingdom; 4× Platinum in Ireland; 2× Platinum in Australia, Canada, and New Zealand; Platinum in the United States and Gold in Argentina, Belgium, Germany, and Russia.

The Killers recorded a live session at Abbey Road Studios for Live from Abbey Road on November 29, 2006. They performed an almost totally unplugged set, which included stripped back versions of the album's title track "Sam's Town", "When You Were Young" and a rendition of the Dire Straits song "Romeo and Juliet". In December 2006, the band released a Christmas charity song, "A Great Big Sled", which benefited Product Red. The annual Christmas singles became a tradition from 2006 to 2016.

The Killers performing in 2007 on the Sam's Town Tour

In February 2007, the Killers attended the BRIT Awards in the United Kingdom, where they performed "When You Were Young". The band won two awards—Best International Group & International Album. In the same month, the band's Tim Burton-directed video for the album's second single, "Bones", won Best Video at the NME Awards.

The band recorded the video for the album's third single "Read My Mind" in Tokyo, Japan during a break in the Sam's Town Tour. The single release was accompanied by a remix of the song by Pet Shop Boys. Due to high ticket demand, the Killers began headlining arenas including Madison Square Garden for the first time and also headlined a number of major European festivals during 2007, including Glastonbury Festival.

The band released a compilation album called Sawdust, containing B-sides from the band's first two albums, rarities, and unreleased material in November 2007. Sawdust has been classified Platinum in the UK. The album's first single, a cover of "Shadowplay" by Joy Division which was recorded for the soundtrack to the Anton Corbijn directed biopic Control, was released in October 2007. "Tranquilize", a collaboration with Lou Reed, was released four days later as the second single from Sawdust.

=== 2008–2010: Day & Age and hiatus ===
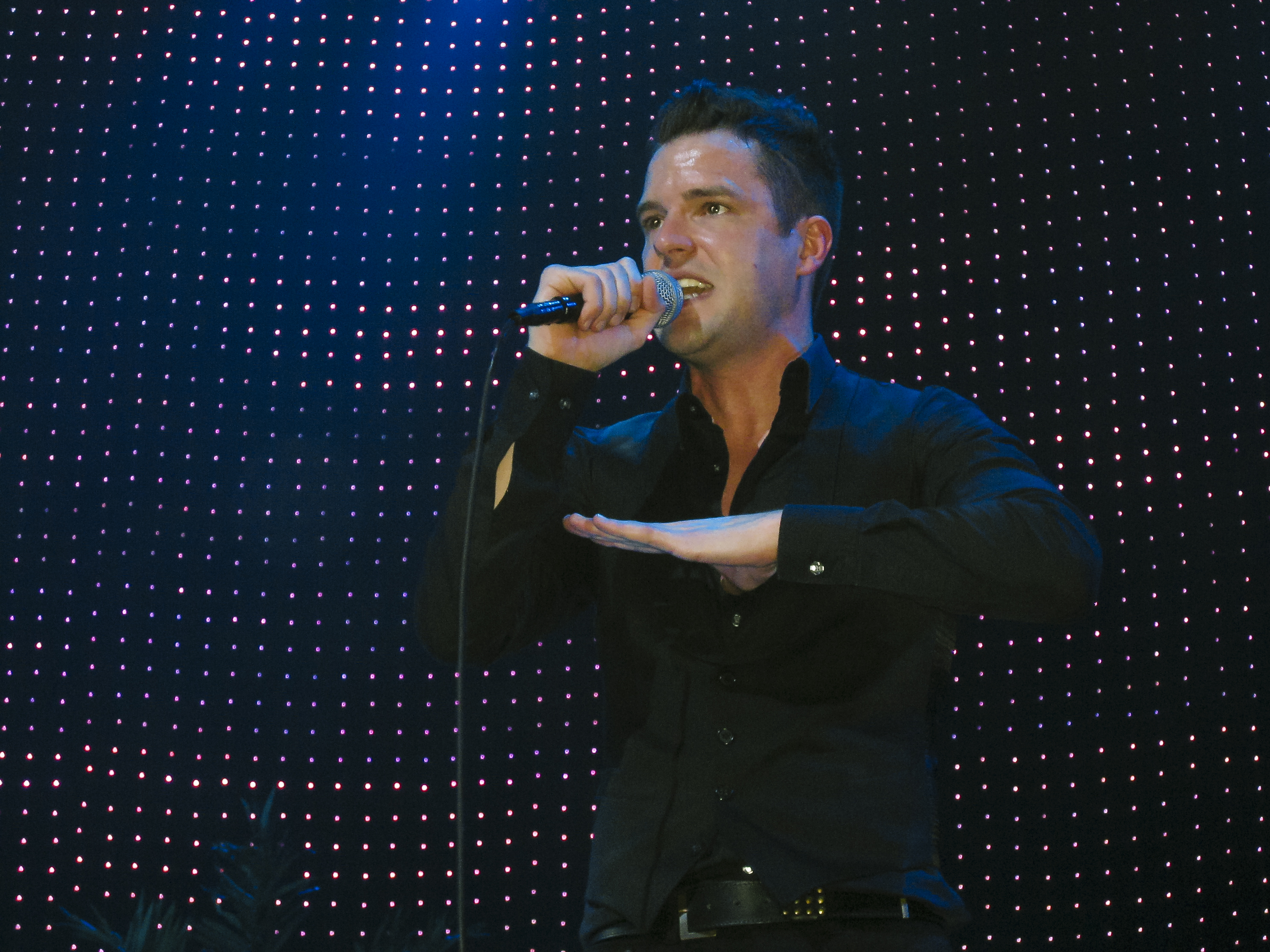
Brandon Flowers during the Day & Age World Tour

The band enlisted Stuart Price to produce their third studio album, he had previously remixed their songs under his Jacques Lu Cont moniker, the most notable being the remix of "Mr. Brightside" featured on Sawdust. They first met Price at his London home in 2007, originally to discuss the possibility of him producing some unreleased tracks for Sawdust, however, that same night they ended up in Price's home studio recording a demo of "Human", a new song that would become the eventual lead single from Day & Age. The band took six months apart following the completion of the Sam's Town Tour, and during this period they would send song ideas between each other and Price via Logic Pro. The band finished recording the album with Price at the band's newly acquired Battle Born Studios in Las Vegas.

"Human" was released in September 2008 with Flowers describing the song as "Johnny Cash meets the Pet Shop Boys". The song became a hit worldwide. The lyric "Are we human, or are we dancer?" confused listeners, due to its grammar and ambiguity. Flowers explained that the line was inspired by a Hunter S. Thompson quote where he stated America was raising "a generation of dancers". It has since been voted by one poll as the most confusing song lyric of all time.

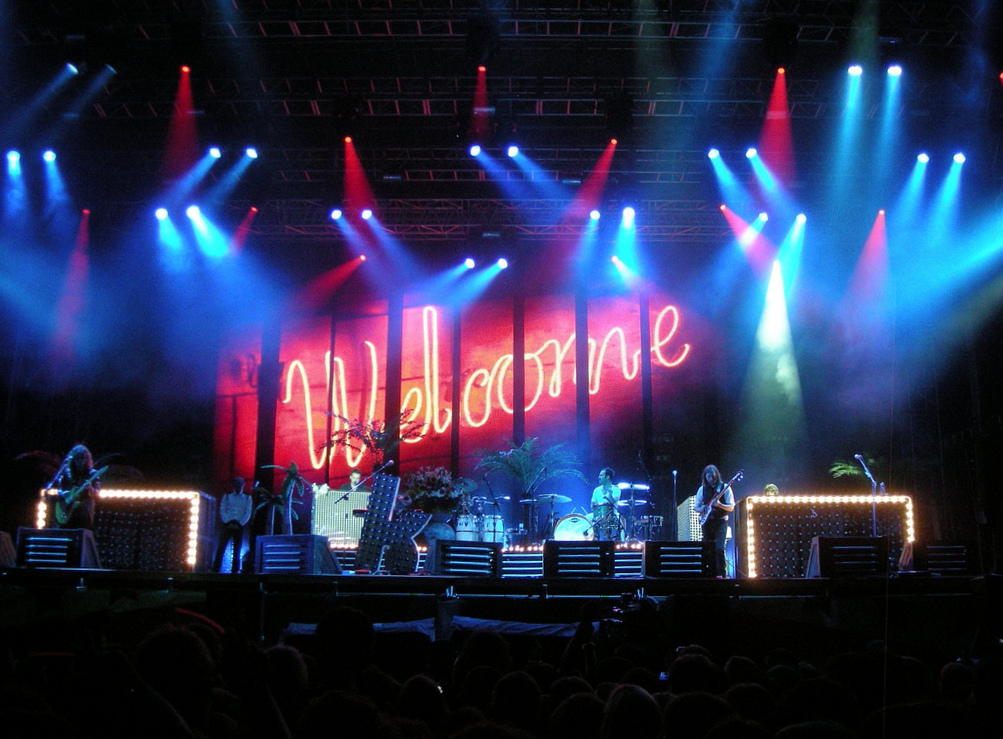
The Killers performing in 2009

Day & Age was released on November 18, 2008. Flowers stated that Day & Age was "like looking at Sam's Town from Mars", with the band having called it their "most playful record" with the album making use of saxophones, steel drums, harpsichord, and tribal chanting. The album also saw the band write some of their most personal and challenging lyrics to date. Closing track "Goodnight, Travel Well" was written about the death of Keuning's mother, while "A Dustland Fairytale" was written as a tribute to frontman Flowers' parents, as his mother had recently been diagnosed with terminal cancer. Day & Age became the band's third studio album to reach number one in both the UK and Ireland, reaching number six on the Billboard 200 album chart. It has also been certified 4× Platinum in the UK and Ireland, Platinum in Germany, Australia, New Zealand and Canada and Gold in the US, Mexico, Sweden, Norway, Austria, Switzerland, and Greece.

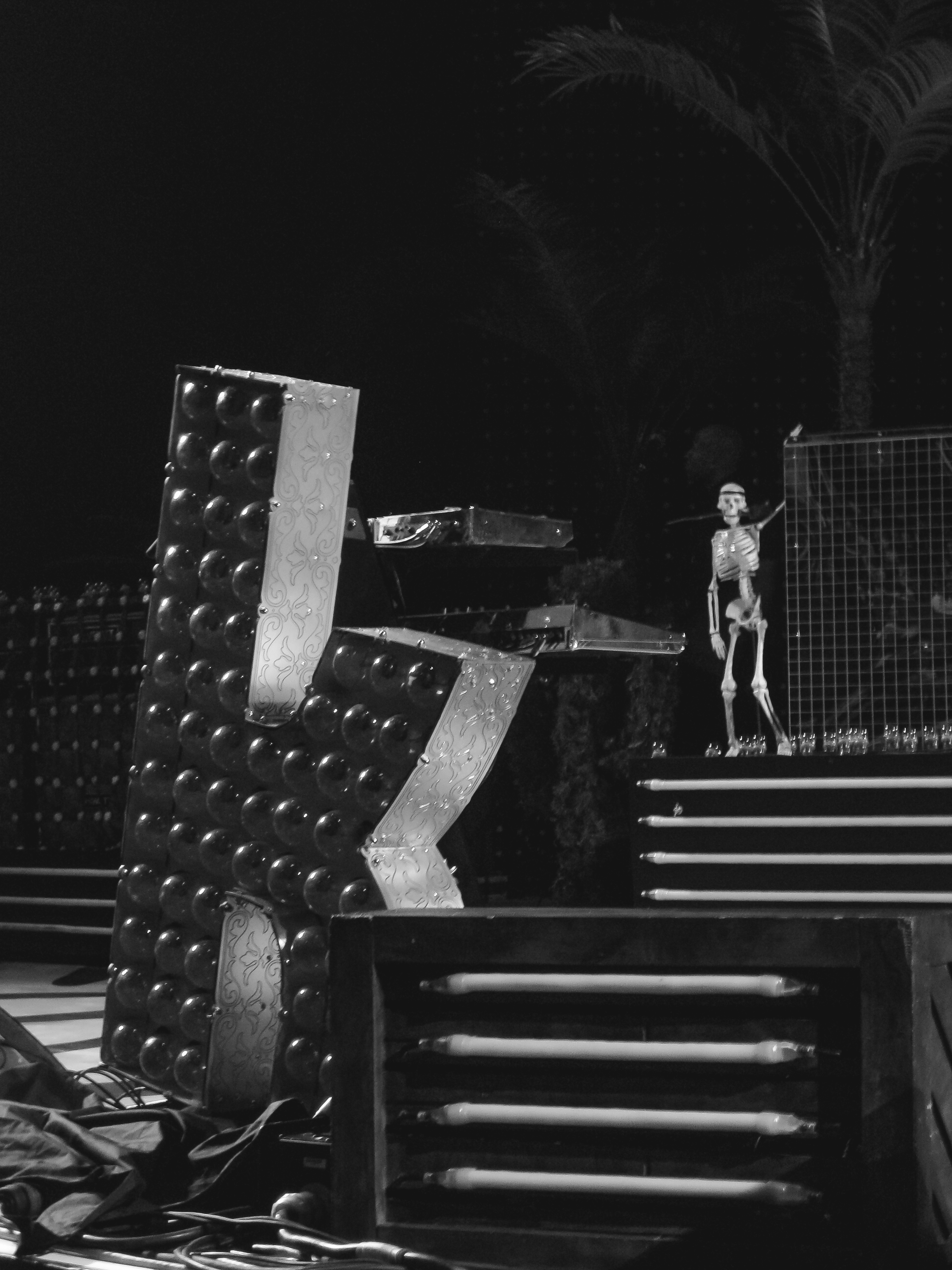
Set design for the Day & Age World Tour

The band embarked on the Day & Age World Tour, during which they performed on every continent except Antarctica and headlined US festivals Lollapalooza and Coachella for the first time. The tour was named one of the top 50 worldwide concert tours of 2009. On July 5 and 6, 2009 at the Royal Albert Hall in London, the Killers recorded their first live DVD, Live from the Royal Albert Hall. It was released in November of that year and played at various cinemas across the globe. Live from the Royal Albert Hall was certified 2× Platinum in the UK, Platinum in the US and Australia and Gold in Ireland and Brazil.

In January 2010, the band announced that they would take a short break after being on the road for the better part of six years. The break lasted for about a year and a half, during which band members devoted themselves on solo projects, while the band made sporadic other contributions. In late February 2010, Flowers' mother died from brain cancer, resulting in the cancellation of tour dates in Asia. Two Australian dates in Sydney and Perth were also cancelled; however, both the Gold Coast and Melbourne concerts went ahead, with the Day & Age World Tour finally coming to a close in Melbourne on February 21, when the Killers were the headline act of the Good Vibrations Festival at Flemington Racecourse.

=== 2011–2016: Return, Battle Born and Direct Hits ===
The band returned to the stage in 2011 when they headlined the new International Lollapalooza Festival in Santiago, Chile on April 2, 2011. They also performed at the season closing Top of the Mountain concert in Ischgl, Austria on April 30, 2011. They headlined Hard Rock Calling for the second time in Hyde Park, London on June 24, 2011. The Killers were also the inaugural headliner of the new Orlando Calling Festival in Orlando, Florida on November 12, 2011.

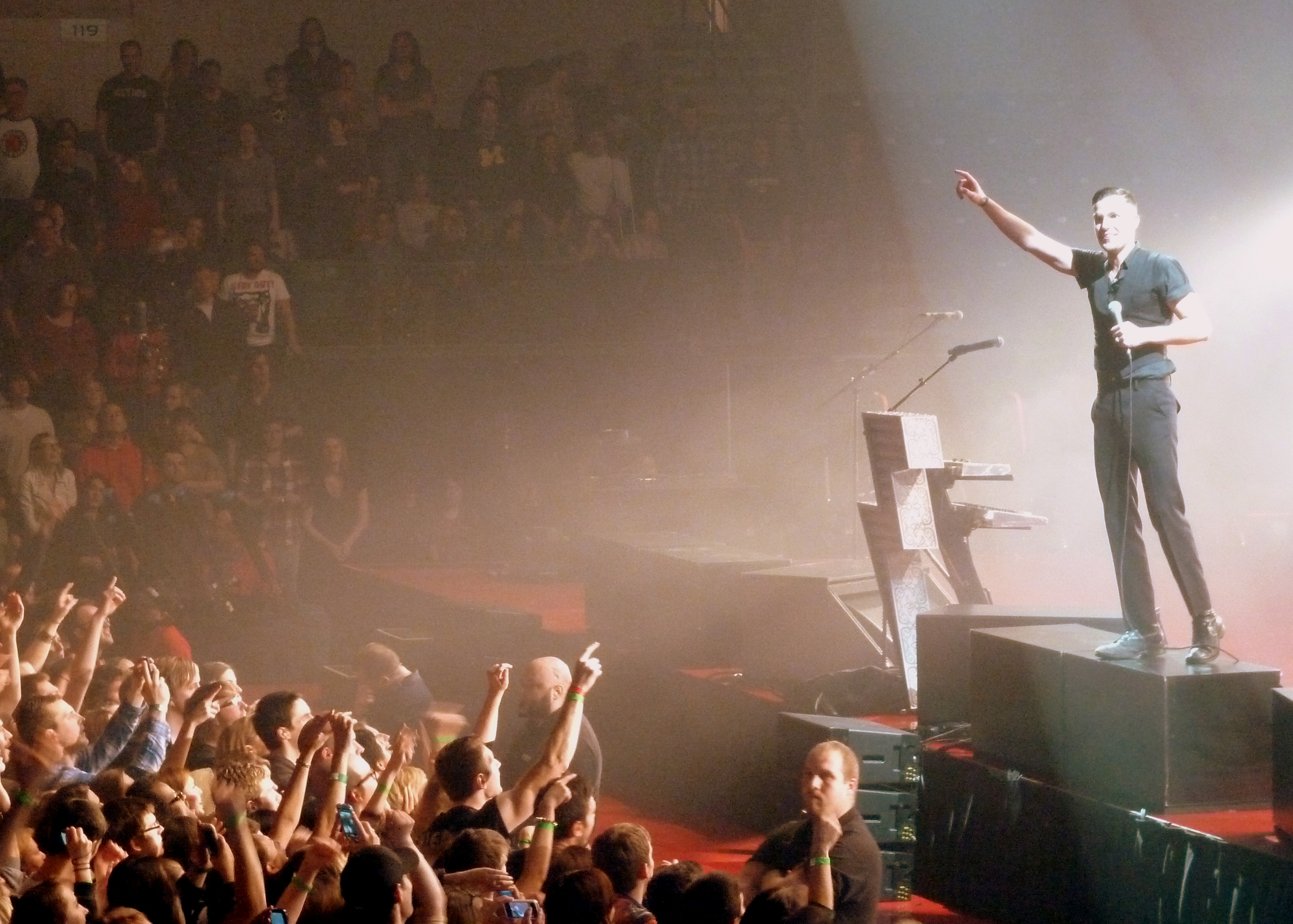
Brandon Flowers in 2012

The band headed back into the studio to record their fourth studio album in 2011, and during the recording they worked with five producers; Steve Lillywhite, Damian Taylor, Brendan O'Brien, Stuart Price and Daniel Lanois. In June 2012, a short trailer was released on the Killers VEVO page, revealing the album's name Battle Born, named after the flag of Nevada. This was followed by the release of lead single "Runaways" in July. That same month, they headlined Saturday night at the inaugural Firefly Music Festival in Dover, Delaware.

The Killers' fourth studio album Battle Born was released on September 18, 2012. The album became the Killers' fourth consecutive No. 1 album in the UK and Ireland and has been certified Platinum in the UK and Gold in Ireland, Mexico and Australia. The band's Battle Born World Tour was their most widespread yet, with the band visiting new territories including Russia and China. The tour was named the 43rd highest grossing worldwide during 2013. On June 22, 2013, the band played their biggest show to date at the 90,000 capacity Wembley Stadium; the band performed a song specifically written for the occasion known as "Wembley Song". Reviews of the show were positive. The band once again headlined festivals across Europe, Australia, South America & North America. In October 2013 the Killers headlined the inaugural Life Is Beautiful Festival in hometown Las Vegas, concluding their Battle Born World Tour.

On September 11, 2013, the band tweeted a picture, which contained six lines of Morse code. The code was translated to "The Killers Shot at the Night". On September 16, 2013, exactly ten years to the day of their first show in London, the Killers released "Shot at the Night" which was produced by Anthony Gonzalez. It was also revealed that they would be releasing their first greatest hits compilation, Direct Hits on November 11, 2013. The album featured songs from all four studio albums, the new single "Shot at the Night" and another new song titled "Just Another Girl". The release of Direct Hits was followed by a short promotional tour, the band also played a number of festivals in 2014.

The band headlined the opening night of the new T-Mobile Arena on the Las Vegas Strip on April 6, 2016, joined during their set by a number of guests including "Mr. Las Vegas" Wayne Newton and the Blue Man Group. On May 24, 2016, the band announced that Stoermer was taking a break from touring, In Stoermer's absence, touring musician Jake Blanton moved to bass guitar. On August 1, 2016, a double vinyl reissue of Sam's Town was announced via Bong Load Records. The reissue included a Pet Shop Boys remix of "Read My Mind", as well as a previously unreleased demo called "Peace of Mind". Alongside the reissue, two concert dates performing Sam's Town were announced at Sam's Town Hotel and Gambling Hall, the namesake of the album, set for September 30 and October 1. The band, including Stoermer, played the entirety of Sam's Town in full both nights. The double vinyl reissue was released on October 7, 2016. The band co-wrote and performed on the song "Mixed Signals" from Robbie Williams' eleventh studio album, The Heavy Entertainment Show, released in November 2016, which was later released as a single in February 2017.

Since 2016 and 2017, respectively, Stoermer and Keuning have had extended hiatuses from the band. Stoermer mostly retired from touring, citing both exhaustion and lingering effects from a pyrotechnics accident, while Keuning released a solo album. Despite his hiatus from touring, Stoermer participated in recording sessions for Wonderful Wonderful and Imploding the Mirage, and it was announced that Keuning was participating in recording Pressure Machine, which was released in 2021. Ted Sablay, who had served as a touring keyboardist and rhythm guitarist for the band since 2006, assumed lead guitar duties for live shows in Keuning's absence, while touring rhythm guitarist and keyboardist Jake Blanton assumed the role of bassist in live shows. With Sablay moving to lead guitar, the band hired Taylor Milne and Robbie Connolly to play rhythm guitar and keyboards, respectively, live.

=== 2017–2018: Wonderful Wonderful ===
The Killers released their fifth studio album, Wonderful Wonderful, on September 22, 2017. The album was produced by Jacknife Lee and lead single "The Man" was released on June 14, 2017. Before the album's release, the band headed to Europe for a number of summer festival dates, including an unannounced set at Glastonbury Festival, where Stoermer joined them to perform on the John Peel Stage, the same stage they had performed on during their first appearance at the festival 13 years earlier. The run of shows concluded with a sold-out headline performance at the British Summer Time festival in London's Hyde Park.

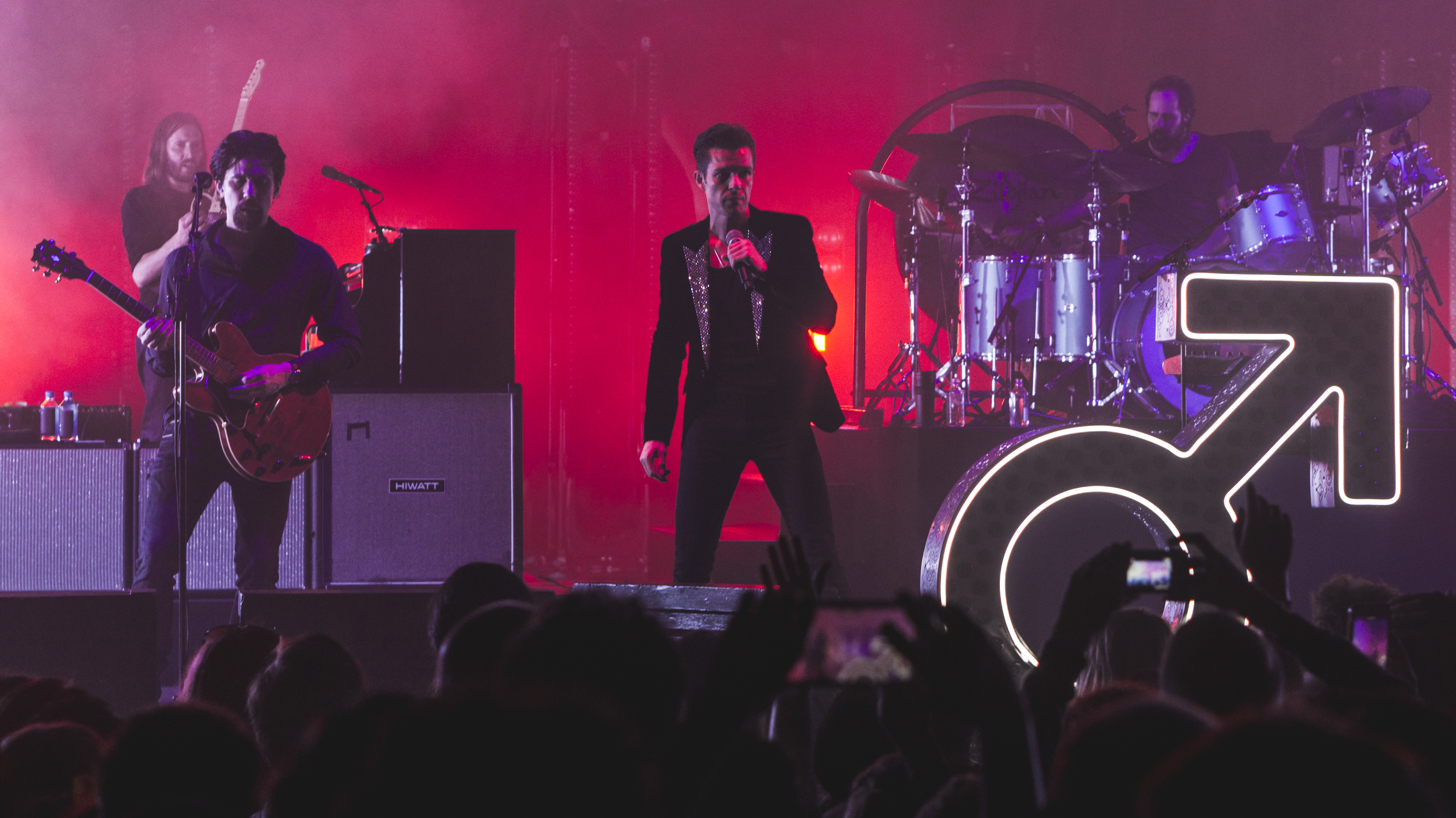
The Killers performing in September 2017

On August 6, 2017, it was announced that Dave Keuning was going on an indefinite hiatus from the band, citing exhaustion from a grueling tour schedule and a desire to spend more time with his son.

The Killers released a statement on August 28, 2017, confirming that neither Stoermer nor Keuning would participate in the band's upcoming Wonderful Wonderful World Tour, while reiterating that both are still members of the band. Jake Blanton would continue to fill in for Stoermer while touring guitarist Ted Sablay would fill in for Keuning. The band added another two touring musicians: keyboardist/rhythm guitarist Robbie Connolly and rhythm/lead guitarist Taylor Milne, a member of Big Talk, Vannucci's side project.

The band headlined the 2017 AFL Grand Final in Melbourne, Australia, on September 30, 2017. Following the conclusion of the game, the band also headlined a free concert at the Melbourne Cricket Ground and earned praise for their performance. They also welcomed onstage Jack Riewoldt, a fan and a vice-captain of the Richmond side that had been victorious against Adelaide in the Grand Final, to perform "Mr. Brightside" with them.

Wonderful Wonderful became the band's first album to reach the number one spot on the US Billboard 200. It also claimed the top spot on the UK Album Chart, making the Killers the first international act to have their first five studio albums reach number one in the UK.

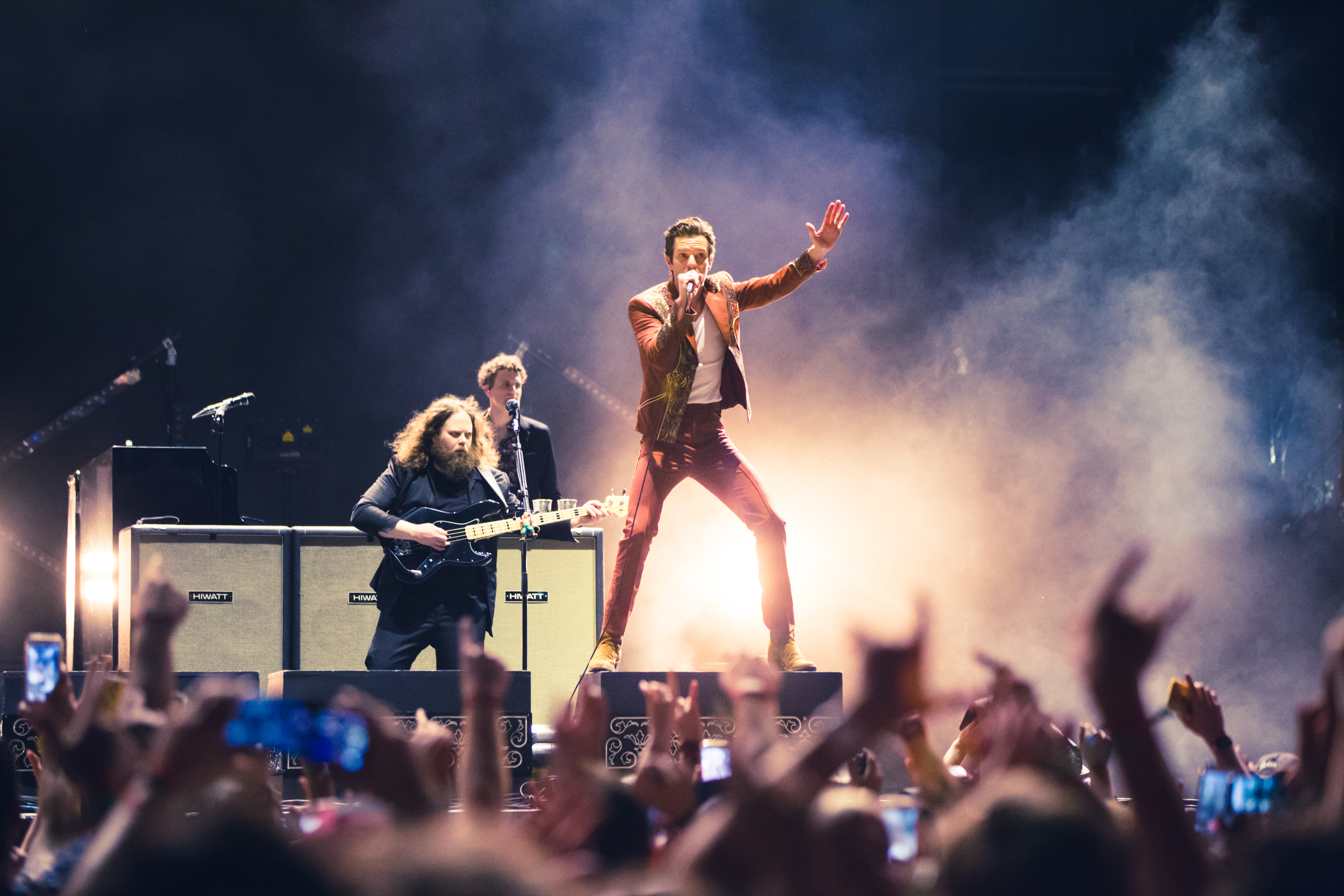
The Killers performing at Bonnaroo 2018

In May 2018, Flowers told the Irish Independent that he wanted to make another album with the band. In October 2018, guitarist Dave Keuning told NME that the band was in the early stages of the next album, though he wasn't sure how big a role he would have in its creation process.

On January 14, 2019, the band released the standalone track, "Land of the Free", the official music video for which was directed by Spike Lee. It was announced that the Killers would be performing at Woodstock 50, though Woodstock 50 was canceled after a series of permit and production issues, venue relocations, and artist cancellations.

=== 2019–2021: Imploding the Mirage, Pressure Machine and Keuning's return ===
On November 15, 2019, the Killers announced their sixth studio album titled Imploding the Mirage, due for a Spring 2020 release. On that day, the band also announced a UK and Ireland stadium tour to take place in May and June 2020. On March 12, 2020, the album's lead single "Caution" was released featuring a solo by Fleetwood Mac guitarist Lindsey Buckingham. Lindsey Buckingham said of the band, "There's such a strong center to what they're doing. Their material is so well crafted that it cuts across a lot of generational lines." It was also confirmed by Flowers that Keuning did not participate in recording the album and that he will still not be touring with the band. On April 25, 2020, "Caution" reached number one on Billboard's Alternative Songs chart, setting a record of 13 years and 6 months since the band's last number-one song on the chart.

In an interview with Rolling Stone published on May 5, 2020, Flowers and Vannucci stated that while Keuning is on hiatus from the band and that they had difficulties in working on the new album without him, he is still welcome to return to the Killers. They also stated that although Stoermer's role in the band continues to be limited due to pyro-inflicted hearing damage suffered during a past show in London, he is still close with Flowers and Vannucci, was involved in the recording of the album, and is expected to play select live shows once touring resumes. On July 15, 2020, the band released the music video of their new album second single "My Own Soul's Warning" and stated the album would be released on August 21, 2020.

On the weekend of Imploding the Mirage's release, Flowers revealed that the band was currently in the studio working on their seventh studio album: "You know when someone makes a record and they say that they have fifty songs and they're going to release another record? Well, we really are! We're going to release another one in about ten months. We've already gone back into the studio with [producers Jonathan] Rado and Shawn [Everett]. I'm excited. It might be better than [Imploding the Mirage]." The band revealed a provisional "A-List" of "apparent song titles on social media, sparking speculation that another new album could be on the way" on December 22. In January 2021, Dave Keuning reunited with the band in the studio to record their seventh album. Keuning also said that he and Mark Stoermer are open to playing live with the band. During a podcast interview in June, Vannucci revealed that the album would be released in August.

On June 10, 2021, Bruce Springsteen announced an upcoming collaboration with the Killers. Later that day, the Killers' social media announced the remake of "A Dustland Fairytale" retitled "Dustland" after a series of teases by the band throughout the day.

As it was announced on July 19, 2021, the band's seventh album, entitled Pressure Machine, was released on August 13, 2021. Mark Stoermer remained absent due to difficulties presented by the COVID-19 pandemic during recording and did not make it to the studio. Pressure Machine debuted at No. 1. on the Official U.K. Albums Chart, snagging the band's seventh U.K. No. 1.

=== 2022–present: Aborted eighth album, Rebel Diamonds, and "Bright Lights" ===
In March 2022, the band released a deluxe edition of Pressure Machine. The next month they kicked off the Imploding the Mirage Tour with three nights at the Chelsea Ballroom in the Cosmopolitan of Las Vegas. Bassist Mark Stoermer was still absent, his part covered on tour by Jake Blanton, but Stoermer was reportedly interested in recording the band's next album, their eighth.

On July 8, 2022, the band unveiled their new single, "boy", during their performance at Mad Cool Festival in Madrid. The song was written during the Pressure Machine recording sessions but didn't fit the album's aesthetic. During an interview with NME, Flowers confirmed they have been working on their eighth album, stating there would be more single releases in 2022, leading to the album's release in early 2023. Keuning had previously confirmed that the band had begun working on their eighth album in 2021.

On August 15, 2023, the band performed at the Black Sea Arena in Shekvetili, Georgia. During a performance of the song "For Reasons Unknown", the band attracted controversy as they invited a fan, who happened to be Russian, from the crowd on stage to help them perform the song. This was followed by booing by some parts of the crowd. The band's lead singer Brandon Flowers tried to defuse the tensions by saying that all Killers fans are "brothers and sisters". Some parts of the audience left in protest. The band later shared an apology on their social media, saying that they did not want to insult anyone and their message about friendship was misconstrued amid the political tensions between Russia and Georgia and the occupation of Georgian territories by Russia. Later that month, Flowers confirmed that the eighth album had been scrapped due to his dissatisfaction with its direction, stating "I don't think you'll see us making this type of music any more."

On December 8, 2023, the band released its second greatest hits compilation, Rebel Diamonds, which included three songs from the aborted eighth studio album: "boy", "Your Side of Town" and "Spirit". On December 25, the band previewed a fourth new song on social media, named "We Did It in the Name of Love," which remained otherwise unreleased.

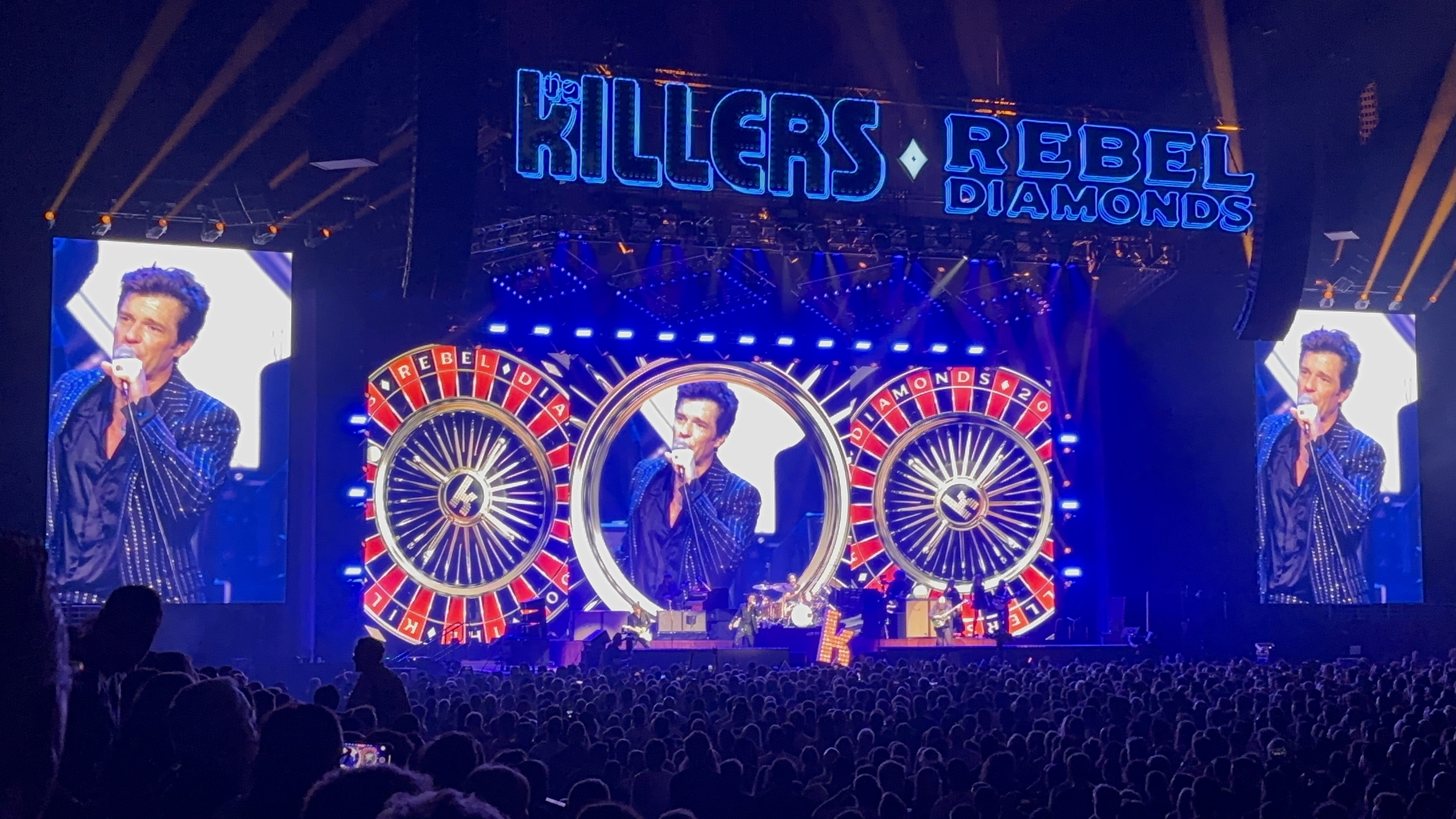
The Killers performing in Sydney, Australia in December 2024

In August 2024, the original four-piece of Flowers, Keuning, Stoermer, and Vannucci Jr. reunited for a fifteen-night concert residency, celebrating the 20th anniversary of Hot Fuss. The reunited line-up performed the album in full each night, and recorded "Bright Lights" to coincide with the residency. The song was the first to feature all four core members since 2017.

On April 12, 2025, the Killers released Encore at the Garden, an extended-play of three songs performed with Bruce Springsteen during an encore at a show at Madison Square Garden during the Imploding the Mirage Tour. The EP, containing the songs "Badlands", "Dustland", and "Born to Run", was released on 12" and digital download, and peaked at number three on the UK Singles Sales Chart. The band would perform a cover of "Lawyers, Guns and Money" for the induction of Warren Zevon to The Rock and Roll Hall of Fame later that year with Keuning using a guitar Zevon had gifted to David Letterman. On May 30, 2026, the band performed at the 2026 UEFA Champions League final kickoff show.

While promoting his third solo album, Thrasher, in August 2026, Brandon Flowers confirmed that the four core members of the band were working a new album with producers Ariel Rechtshaid, Shawn Everett and Jonathan Rado: "It’s not in the can, but the guys have been really great and accommodating about coming to Salt Lake to write and get demos going. [...] We’re just going to keep chipping away. It’s the full band, and we’ve been working with Ariel Rechtshaid, Shawn and Rado. The band have got some time off for good behaviour, but we meet every now and again to see if we’ve got anything left in the tank." Flowers later revealed that the album is due for release "in early 2028", and that the band has "got some titles floating around", but explaining "it’s too early in the game" to reveal it.

== Musical style and influences ==
The Killers have been grouped with various genres, including alternative rock, indie rock, post-punk revival, new wave, heartland rock, pop rock, synth-pop, pop, glam rock, dance-rock, dance-pop, arena rock, and electronic rock.

Keuning's original newspaper ad sought to assemble a band influenced by Oasis, the Smashing Pumpkins, David Bowie, and Radiohead. Band members have also cited artists such as Bruce Springsteen, U2, the Cure, the Cars, and the Smiths, along with more synth-based acts like Duran Duran, Depeche Mode, Pet Shop Boys, New Order, and OMD.

== Solo projects ==
- Brandon Flowers has released three solo albums: Flamingo (2010), The Desired Effect (2015), and Thrasher (2026).
- Mark Stoermer has released three solo albums: Another Life (2011), Dark Arts (2016) and Filthy Apes and Lions (2017).
- Ronnie Vannucci Jr.'s side project, Big Talk, has released two albums: Big Talk (2011) and Straight In No Kissin' (2015).
- Dave Keuning has released two solo albums: Prismism (2019) and A Mild Case of Everything (2021).

== Activism and philanthropy ==
=== Political relations ===
Invited by U.S. President Barack Obama, the band played on the White House South Lawn on July 4, 2010, for the second annual "Salute to the Military" United Service Organizations concert as part of Independence Day celebrations, which Flowers described as a "monumental honor". Despite their hiatus, the band got together to play "Human", "Somebody Told Me", "Mr. Brightside", "A Dustland Fairytale", "God Bless America/Read My Mind", and "When You Were Young". Flowers, Keuning and Stoermer also played at a campaign rally on July 8, 2010, in Nevada for Obama and U.S. Senate Majority Leader Harry Reid who was up for re-election. The Killers played an acoustic version of "Read My Mind" and did a folk rendition of the state song, "Home Means Nevada". In February 2011, Flowers had a private lunch with Mitt Romney during Romney's visit to the Republican Party convention in Nevada. In 2012, the band remained neutral in the election. In 2015, Flowers performed a folksy rendition of the state song, "Home Means Nevada" for Obama and U.S. Senate Minority Leader Harry Reid at the National Clean Energy Summit. In 2017 the band wrote a letter opposing development on the Red Rock Canyon National Conservation Area. The band's 2019 single "Land of the Free" references a number of political issues, including immigration, gun control, and police killings of African Americans.

=== Annual Christmas singles and Don't Waste Your Wishes ===
Beginning in 2006, the Killers released annual Christmas themed singles and videos in aid of the charity Product Red, supporting The Global Fund to Fight AIDS, Tuberculosis and Malaria. The band released ten Christmas themed songs and music videos as singles: "A Great Big Sled" (2006), "Don't Shoot Me Santa" (2007), "Joseph, Better You than Me" (2008), "Happy Birthday Guadalupe!" (2009), "Boots" (2010), "The Cowboys' Christmas Ball" (2011), "I Feel It in My Bones" (2012), "Christmas In LA" (2013), "Joel the Lump of Coal" (2014), and "Dirt Sledding" (2015). On November 30, 2011, they released the (RED) Christmas EP on iTunes which features all six songs that had been released up to that point. Over the years they have enlisted the help of other musicians and celebrities including Elton John, Neil Tennant (Pet Shop Boys), Toni Halliday (Curve), Wild Light, Mariachi El Bronx, Dawes, Owen Wilson, Jimmy Kimmel & Richard Dreyfuss. In 2016, they announced that they would not be releasing any more Christmas singles, but that they hoped another band would carry on the tradition. On November 18, 2016, the band released Don't Waste Your Wishes, a compilation album which featured all ten previous singles, plus a cover of the holiday classic "I'll Be Home for Christmas", featuring vocals from Brandon Flowers' former elementary school teacher and Korean War veteran Ned Humphrey Hansen. All proceeds from the songs and the compilation album have been and will be donated to Product Red campaign and the fight against AIDS in Africa and as of 2016 they have raised over $1 million for the charity.

=== Additional contributions ===
The Killers song "Goodnight, Travel Well" was used in an effort to promote awareness for sex trafficking headed by UNICEF, MTV EXIT (End Exploitation And Trafficking), and the US Agency for International Development. "Hotel California" was covered by the Killers and Rhythms del Mundo with proceeds benefiting climate crisis and natural disaster relief. The U2 song "Ultraviolet (Light My Way)" was covered by the Killers with proceeds benefiting famine-stricken areas. The band headlined the 2017 Global Citizen Festival.

== Band members ==
Current

- Brandon Flowers – lead vocals, keyboards, synthesizer (2001–present), bass (2001, 2006), (Note: Flowers still plays bass during live performances of "For Reasons Unknown".) guitar (2020–present; in studio)
- Dave Keuning (Note: Keuning returned to touring with the band between 2020 and 2022, but is currently on touring hiatus.) – guitar, backing vocals (2001–2017, 2020–present)
- Ronnie Vannucci Jr. – drums, percussion (2002–present), guitar (2020–2022) (Note: Vannucci Jr.'s guitar contributions to the band are mostly studio-based, save for recent live performances of "For Reasons Unknown".)
- Mark Stoermer (Note: Stoermer has been on a touring hiatus from the band since 2016, save for some select appearances.) – bass, backing vocals (2002–present; hiatus 2020–2022), guitar (2006, 2016–2020) (Note: Stoermer's guitar contributions to the band are almost entirely studio-based, save for live performances of "For Reasons Unknown".)

== Discography ==
Studio albums

- Hot Fuss (2004)
- Sam's Town (2006)
- Day & Age (2008)
- Battle Born (2012)
- Wonderful Wonderful (2017)
- Imploding the Mirage (2020)
- Pressure Machine (2021)

== Tours and residencies ==
=== Concert tours ===
Headlining

- Hot Fuss Tour (2003–2005)
- Sam's Town Tour (2006–2007)
- Day & Age World Tour (2008–2010)
- Battle Born World Tour (2012–2014)
- Wonderful Wonderful World Tour (2017–2018)
- Imploding the Mirage Tour (2021–2023)
- Rebel Diamonds Tour (2024)

Opening act

- Vertigo Tour (U2) (2005) (Europe select dates)

=== Concert residencies ===
Headlining

- 20 Years of Hot Fuss (2024–2025)

== Awards and nominations ==
The Killers have been nominated for seven Grammy Awards, seven BRIT Awards, and twenty-four NME Awards. They are also the recipients of the ASCAP Vanguard Award (2010).

The Killers have won four NME Awards for "Best International Band", in 2005, 2008, 2009, and 2013. The band has won a BRIT Award for "Best International Band" in 2007 as well as a MTV Europe Music Award for "Best Rock Group" in 2006. Also in 2006, the band won for "Best Video" for "When You Were Young" at the Q Awards. To date, the band has received six nominations for "Best International Band" at the NME Awards, four nominations for "Best International Group" at the BRIT Awards, and three nominations for "Best Rock Group" at the MTV Europe Music Awards.

=== Sales and streaming accolades ===
- The Killers are the only international act to have a seven-album streak of No. 1 albums, beginning with their debut, on the UK Albums Chart (Brandon Flowers has another two No. 1 solo albums). Their compilation album Rebel Diamonds also reached No. 1.
- Single "Mr. Brightside" is the No. 3 biggest song of all time in the UK, the No. 1 biggest song of all time that did not top the UK singles chart, the longest-charting single on the UK singles chart of all time (500 weeks), and the most-streamed track released prior to 2010 in the UK.
- Hot Fuss charted in the year-end UK Albums Chart each year from 2004 to 2009 and ranks among the top 20 longest-charting albums on the UK Albums Chart.
- Sam's Town charted in the year-end UK Albums Chart each year from 2006 to 2009 and has spent more than two years on the UK Albums Chart.

=== Additional honors ===
- University of Nevada, Las Vegas College of Fine Arts Hall of Fame Inductee (2008)

== See also ==
- List of artists who have spent the most weeks on the UK music charts
- List of songs which have spent the most weeks on the UK Singles Chart
- List of albums which have spent the most weeks on the UK Albums Chart
- List of UK Albums Chart number ones of the 2000s
- List of UK Albums Chart number ones of the 2010s
- List of UK Albums Chart number ones of the 2020s
- List of Billboard 200 number-one albums
- Battle Born Studios
