= Human (The Killers song) =

2008 single by the Killers

- Single cover

Single by the Killers

from the album Day & Age
- B-side: "A Crippling Blow"
- Released: September 22, 2008
- Recorded: 2008
- Genre: Dance-rock; synth-pop; new wave
- Length: 4:09
- Label: Island
- Songwriters: Brandon Flowers; Dave Keuning; Mark Stoermer; Ronnie Vannucci, Jr.
- Producers: Stuart Price; The Killers

The Killers singles chronology
| "Don't Shoot Me Santa" (2007) | "Human" (2008) | "Spaceman" (2008) |

Music video
- "Human" on YouTube

"Human" is a song by American rock band the Killers. Written by and produced by the band members and co-produced by Stuart Price, it was released as the first single from their third studio album Day & Age (2008).

"Human" has received generally positive feedback from music critics, praising the composition, the musical influences and the production. It became the third song by the band to enter the top 5 of the UK Singles Chart. It was their first top-10 hit in the Netherlands (peaking at number 2). The song was released on a seven-inch picture disc throughout the world on various dates in November 2008, with a B-side entitled "A Crippling Blow".

== Background ==
In an interview with Rolling Stone magazine's Smoking Section, Brandon Flowers described "Human" as "Johnny Cash meets the Pet Shop Boys". Flowers stated that the song was created with Stuart Price during their work with him on the Sawdust album, and has changed very little since then. He confessed to not putting it on Sawdust as "it was too good".

The cover art for the single is a portrait of the band's guitarist Dave Keuning, and is one of the four portraits drawn by Paul Normansell for the album.

The earliest digital release of the song was missing a hi-hat section at the beginning of the song.

== Reception ==
The song received positive reviews from contemporary critics. An interview in The Observer stated that the track "is a cross between New Order and Bruce Springsteen - that should please fans of 'Mr. Brightside'." Chris Williams of Billboard gave a positive review, echoing The Observer's description of "merging a Boss-like melody over a New Order-injected rave-up." He also praised the song for "stretching the soundscape of alternative rock, which has increasingly become difficult to differentiate between mainstream rock." Music Radar complimented the song in their review of Day & Age, saying "A gentle, phased, clicky guitar riff opens this gorgeous nod to the gentle side of '80s new wave." Caryn Ganz with Rolling Stone gave the tune three-and-a-half stars, calling it "delicious." "Human" was voted the Best Song of 2008 by the readers of Rolling Stone.

In 2010, a vote by listeners to UK radio station XFM polled the song at #97 in its poll of the Top 1,000 Songs of All Time. In December 2009, it was voted the 25th Best Song of the Decade by listeners of UK music station Absolute Radio. In October 2011, NME placed it at number 144 on its list "150 Best Tracks of the Past 15 Years". Paste and American Songwriter both ranked the song number four on their lists of the greatest Killers songs.

In 2008, the song was the Top Globally Streamed Song on Spotify.

== Lyrics ==
There was confusion and debate over the line "Are we human, or are we dancer?" in the song's chorus due to its grammar. Debate raged across the internet over whether the lyric said "dancer", "dancers" or "denser", a misunderstanding which elicited conflicting interpretations of the song's meaning. On the band's official website, the biography section states that Flowers is singing "Are we human, or are we dancer?" and also says that the lyric was inspired by a disparaging comment made by Hunter S. Thompson, who stated that America was "raising a generation of dancers, afraid to take one step out of line". From an interview:

Flowers is irritated that people don't quite seem to get the lyric, and that fans were unhappy with the song's dance beat. "It's supposed to be a dance song, it goes with the chorus," he says. "If you can't put that together, you're an idiot. I just don't get why there's a confusion about it."

— Rolling Stone

In 2014, it was voted the "weirdest lyric of all time" by a Blinkbox survey.

== Chart performance ==
In the US "Human" debuted at number 13 on Billboard's Hot Modern Rock Tracks chart, and peaked at number 6. It is the band's sixth top-10 hit on the chart. The song debuted and peaked at number 32 on the Billboard Hot 100 on the chart week of October 18, 2008, giving the Killers their third top-40 hit there. It reached number 3 on the UK Singles Chart, and in 2012, BBC Radio 1 announced that it was the 39th-most-downloaded song of all time in the country.

On the Canadian Hot 100, the song debuted at number nine. It debuted at number 34 on the New Zealand RIANZ chart, and entered at number four on the Norway Top 20, then reached number one. "Human" reached the top ten on the Irish Singles Chart and in Sweden. The song debuted at number 48 on the Australian Aria Charts and peaked at number 28.

== Music video ==
The music video for "Human" was released in mid-October 2008 and directed by Danny Drysdale. It features the band performing the song in Goblin Valley State Park, Utah. The portraits of the band drawn for the album by Paul Normansell are shown in the video, such as when the band members hold the portraits in front of their faces. Various animals are also shown throughout the video, such as a white tiger, an eagle, and a cougar. It has been noted to have heavy similarities to Pink Floyd's Live at Pompeii concert film, such as the band playing the song in a desert landscape amongst various amplifiers and other stage equipment and mostly in much of the camera angles. The video ends with the band watching the sun setting in the desert, which turns into the album cover, also drawn by Paul Normansell.

== In popular culture ==
=== Media ===
The song was used for the Spanish television station Telecinco's advertisement of the 2010 FIFA World Cup Final. The motto was "Una final no se juega; una final se gana" (A final is not played; a final is won).

On November 25, 2008, the song was available as downloadable content for the game Guitar Hero World Tour.

In 2018, the song was used by American Express on one of its TV advertisements.

In 2024, the song was featured in the first episode of the second season of The Big Door Prize.

In 2026, the song was used in a Super Bowl LX advertisement for TD Bank.

=== Versions ===
- DJs Armin van Buuren and Ferry Corsten produced remixes.
- English duo Go West covered the song in November 2015 on the compilation album 80's Re:Covered. The same album also included a remix.
- Actress Minnie Driver released a cover on her third studio album Ask Me to Dance (2014).
- For her Spotify Singles EP (2018), Kim Petras performed an acoustic cover of the song recorded at Spotify Studios NYC.
- The indie rock duo Better Oblivion Community Center performed a version of "Human" during its 2019 tour.
- DJs Hardwell and Machine Made sampled the track for their own version of "Human".

== Awards ==
| Year | Ceremony | Award | Result |
|---|---|---|---|
| 2009 | MuchMusic Video Awards | Best International Video – Group | Nominated |

== Track listings ==
7-inch vinyl single

1. "Human" – 4:09
2. "A Crippling Blow" – 3:37

European cardsleeve single

1. "Human" – 4:09
2. "A Crippling Blow" – 3:37

German CD

1. "Human" – 4:09
2. "A Crippling Blow" – 3:37
3. "Human" (Armin van Buuren Club Remix) – 8:11
4. "Human" (Video Clip) – Enhanced CD

Digital remixes EP

1. "Human" (Armin van Buuren Radio Remix) – 3:47
2. "Human" (Ferry Corsten Radio Remix) – 4:26
3. "Human" (Pink Noise Radio Edit) – 4:06
4. "Human" (Armin Van Buuren Club Remix) – 8:11
5. "Human" (Ferry Corsten Club Remix) – 6:53

Limited-edition 12-inch vinyl single

1. "Human" – 4:09
2. "A Crippling Blow" – 3:37

== Charts ==
=== Weekly charts ===
| Chart (2008–2009) | Peak position |
|---|---|
| Australia (ARIA) | 28 |
| Austria (Ö3 Austria Top 40) | 6 |
| Belgium (Ultratop 50 Flanders) | 15 |
| Belgium (Ultratip Bubbling Under Wallonia) | 6 |
| Canada Hot 100 (Billboard) | 9 |
| Czech Republic Airplay (ČNS IFPI) | 3 |
| Denmark (Tracklisten) | 4 |
| Europe (European Hot 100 Singles) | 5 |
| Finland (Suomen virallinen lista) | 15 |
| Germany (GfK) | 4 |
| Hungary (Rádiós Top 40) | 12 |
| Ireland (IRMA) | 4 |
| Israel International Airplay (Media Forest) | 1 |
| Italy (FIMI) | 6 |
| Japan Hot 100 (Billboard) | 57 |
| Mexico Anglo (Monitor Latino) | 3 |
| Netherlands (Dutch Top 40) | 2 |
| Netherlands (Single Top 100) | 6 |
| New Zealand (Recorded Music NZ) | 17 |
| Norway (VG-lista) | 1 |
| Portugal Digital Songs (Billboard) | 4 |
| Romania (Romanian Top 100) | 7 |
| Scottish Singles Sales (Official Charts) | 12 |
| Slovakia Airplay (ČNS IFPI) | 2 |
| Spain (Promusicae) | 11 |
| Sweden (Sverigetopplistan) | 4 |
| Switzerland (Schweizer Hitparade) | 7 |
| UK Singles (Official Charts) | 3 |
| US Billboard Hot 100 | 32 |
| US Adult Alternative Airplay (Billboard) | 3 |
| US Adult Pop Airplay (Billboard) | 17 |
| US Alternative Airplay (Billboard) | 6 |
| US Dance Airplay (Billboard) | 15 |
| US Dance Club Songs (Billboard) | 1 |
| US Pop Airplay (Billboard) | 35 |

=== Year-end charts ===
| Chart (2008) | Position |
|---|---|
| Germany (Official German Charts) | 74 |
| Netherlands (Dutch Top 40) | 75 |
| Netherlands (Single Top 100) | 90 |
| Sweden (Sverigetopplistan) | 79 |
| Switzerland (Schweizer Hitparade) | 76 |
| UK Singles (OCC) | 36 |

| Chart (2009) | Position |
|---|---|
| Austria (Ö3 Austria Top 40) | 29 |
| Belgium (Ultratop 50 Flanders) | 64 |
| Canada (Canadian Hot 100) | 95 |
| Europe (European Hot 100 Singles) | 18 |
| Germany (Official German Charts) | 21 |
| Hungary (Rádiós Top 40) | 48 |
| Italy (FIMI) | 19 |
| Netherlands (Dutch Top 40) | 25 |
| Netherlands (Single Top 100) | 46 |
| Sweden (Sverigetopplistan) | 33 |
| Switzerland (Schweizer Hitparade) | 34 |
| UK Singles (OCC) | 58 |
| US Dance Club Songs (Billboard) | 35 |
| US Adult Top 40 (Billboard) | 47 |
| Venezuela Pop Rock (Record Report) | 2 |

=== Decade-end charts ===
| Chart (2000–2009) | Position |
|---|---|
| UK Singles (OCC) | 87 |

== Certifications ==
| Region | Certification | Certified units/sales |
|---|---|---|
| Australia (ARIA) | 3× Platinum | 210,000^{‡} |
| Brazil (Pro-Música Brasil) | Platinum | 60,000^{‡} |
| Canada (Music Canada) | 2× Platinum | 160,000^{‡} |
| Denmark (IFPI Danmark) | Platinum | 15,000^{^} |
| Germany (BVMI) | Platinum | 300,000^{‡} |
| Italy (FIMI) | Platinum | 100,000^{‡} |
| New Zealand (RMNZ) | 2× Platinum | 60,000^{‡} |
| Spain (Promusicae) | Platinum | 60,000^{‡} |
| Sweden (GLF) | Gold | 10,000^{^} |
| United Kingdom (BPI) | 3× Platinum | 1,800,000^{‡} |
| United States (RIAA) | 2× Platinum | 2,000,000^{‡} |
^{^} Shipments figures based on certification alone.^{‡} Sales+streaming figures based on certification alone.

== Release history ==
Release dates and formats for "Human"
| Region | Date | Format | Label(s) | Ref. |
|---|---|---|---|---|
| United States | October 14, 2008 | Mainstream airplay | Island | |
