= Day & Age =

Studio album by the Killers
- Released: November 18, 2008
- Recorded: April–September 2008
- Studios: Battle Born (Las Vegas, Nevada)
- Genres: Dance-rock; new wave; synth-pop
- Length: 40:49
- Label: Island
- Producers: Stuart Price; The Killers

The Killers chronology
Sawdust (2007)	Day & Age (2008)	Live from the Royal Albert Hall (2009)

Singles from Day & Age
- 1. "Human" Released: September 22, 2008; 2. "Spaceman" Released: November 4, 2008; 3. "The World We Live In" Released: May 18, 2009 (EUR); 4. "A Dustland Fairytale" Released: June 9, 2009 (NA)

Day & Age is the third studio album by American rock band the Killers. It was released on November 18, 2008, by Island Records. Frontman and lead vocalist Brandon Flowers described it as the band's "most playful record". As of May 2015, Day & Age had sold three million copies worldwide. Following the release of the album, the band embarked on the Day & Age World Tour.

== Production ==
The band began writing the tracks for Day & Age while on the road during the Sam's Town Tour. Producer Stuart Price had worked on a few remixes for the Killers, but the band had still never met him until they connected in London in 2006. Price and the band had dinner, before returning to his home studio and recording the lead single "Human" in two hours. The band recorded demos in Las Vegas and sent them to Price in London over the Internet, who would then call back to discuss the recordings. With the album largely done, the Killers met at their Las Vegas studio in May 2008 to put the finishing touches to the album. Flowers stated that the concept for the album is a "continuation" of Sam's Town, saying "it's like looking at Sam's Town from Mars".

When asked about the meaning behind the album's title, Flowers replied, "I don't know. You wait for moments. I just wait for it to come, and I knew that [Day & Age] was right when I had it." The album's title is also part of the lyrics to two of the album's tracks: "Neon Tiger" and "The World We Live In".

The Killers enlisted Paul Normansell to create the artwork for the album. Portraits of the band members themselves are included in the album. These portraits can be seen at various parts of the "Human" video, as well as the cover of Day & Age and the CD insert. On December 8, 2008, Rolling Stone named the album cover for Day & Age the best album cover of 2008. On December 15, Rolling Stone readers voted Day & Age the best album of 2008.

In an interview with Rolling Stone in September 2009, Flowers commented on the album, stating:

"It sits well with our other two albums. It's obviously a little more on the pop end of things; it's not quite as masculine as Sam's Town, but I like it. 'Spaceman' is such a playful tune, it makes my body do things I've never done before. 'Human' is one of our best recordings so far. I don't think we've made our best album yet, and that makes me happy, to know it's still out there."

== Singles ==
The first single from the album, "Human", was released to radio on September 22, 2008, and became available for download on September 30, 2008. The band performed "Human" and "Spaceman" on the October 4, 2008, episode of Saturday Night Live. They released the video for "Human" in October 2008.

"Spaceman" was released digitally on November 4, 2008, in the US. The vinyl edition was released in the US on November 18, 2008, and included a free download of the album from Island Records. The music video premiered in January 2009.

"The World We Live In" was released as the third single in Europe and Australia, while "A Dustland Fairytale" served as the third single in the United States. The single "The World We Live In" has been described as "a song that gives you a Disney/floating-in-the-air feeling" by music critic Brian Narvaez.

As with the album cover, the singles' covers were designed by Paul Normansell and consist of the same individual-band-member images that appear in the album's booklet. Dave Keuning's picture was used for the "Human" cover, and the "Spaceman" cover was Brandon Flowers. Ronnie Vannucci Jr.'s picture features on the single "The World We Live In". Mark Stoermer is on the cover for the single "A Dustland Fairytale".

Additionally, the band released a video for "Goodnight, Travel Well" in partnership with MTV EXIT, UNICEF, and USAID in order to raise awareness about human trafficking. It premiered globally on MTV on July 13, 2009, and on UNICEF's YouTube page the next day.

== Tour ==
In support of the album, the Killers embarked on their third major concert tour, the Day & Age World Tour. The tour started on October 20, 2008, in Las Vegas, and ended on February 21, 2010, in Melbourne. During the tour, the band recorded their first live album, Live from the Royal Albert Hall, and played their first shows on the continent of Africa.

== Critical reception ==
Professional ratings
Aggregate scores
Source	Rating
AnyDecentMusic?	6.8/10
Metacritic	69/100
Review scores
Source	Rating
AllMusic	3.5/5 stars
The A.V. Club	B−
Entertainment Weekly	B+
The Guardian	3/5 stars
NME	7/10
Pitchfork	5.9/10
Q	3/5 stars
Rolling Stone	3.5/5 stars
Spin	3.5/5 stars
USA Today	3.5/4 stars

Day & Age received generally positive reviews from music critics. At Metacritic, which assigns a normalized rating out of 100 to reviews from mainstream publications, the album received an average score of 69, based on 31 reviews. Edna Gundersen of USA Today called Day & Age "outstanding" and "a fresh and immediate arena-rock triumph". She continued, "The sound isn't just bigger, it's transnational, yielding the kind of radiant, whip-smart rock album you seldom hear in this day and age." Jill Menze of Billboard called the album a "gamble" and said "if nothing else, this band keeps fans on their toes, and they're likely to buy in for another round." Entertainment Weekly's Leah Greenblatt commented on the album's influences from Duran Duran, Bono and David Bowie and ultimately said, "Like Vegas itself, Day & Age sometimes leans toward sensory overload. But the pull of its showgirls-and-fool's-gold glory is undeniable." Stacey Anderson of Spin called it "a respectably vivacious dance-rock album." Michael Franco of PopMatters stated, "The bulk of the album... sees the Killers doing what they do best: crafting new wave dance songs that sound like lost classics from the '80s."

In a mixed review, Ryan Dombal of Pitchfork characterized Day & Age as "the Killers' spitball album, the one where they try everything and see what works while Flowers grasps for a relatable tone." Q concluded that the album contained "four great songs, two so-so ones and four duds", while noting that "the spirit in which it was made merits goodwill." Drowned in Sound reviewer Andrzej Lukowski found that the Killers rarely deviated from "breezy synth pop" on what he ultimately termed "an enjoyable but fairly throwaway pop record."

=== Accolades ===
Awards and nominations for Day & Age
Ceremony	Year	Award	Result
Brit Awards	2009	Best International Album	Nominated
Shockwaves NME Awards	2009	Best Album	Nominated
Shockwaves NME Awards	2009	Best Album Artwork	Nominated

Day & Age on critics' lists and readers' polls
Publication	Country	Accolade	Year	Rank
Q	United Kingdom	250 Best Albums of Q's Lifetime 1986–2010	2011	144
Q	United Kingdom	50 Best Albums of the Year	2008	22
New York Post	United States	Top 10 Albums of the Year	2008	2
Rolling Stone	United States	Readers' Top 30 Albums of 2008	2008	1
Rolling Stone	United States	Top Album Covers of 2008	2008	1
Rolling Stone	United States	Most Underrated Album of the Decade: Readers' Poll	2010	6

== Commercial performance ==
Day & Age debuted at number six on the US Billboard 200, selling 193,000 copies in its first week. The album was certified gold by the Recording Industry Association of America (RIAA) on January 27, 2009, and by July 2012, it had sold 774,000 copies in the United States. Day & Age debuted at number one on the UK Albums Chart with 200,299 copies sold in its first week, becoming the band's third consecutive number-one studio album on the chart. On February 12, 2010, it was certified four-times platinum by the British Phonographic Industry (BPI). As of August 2020, the album had sold 1.31 million copies in the United Kingdom.

== Track listing ==
All tracks are written by the Killers.

No.	Title	Length
1.	"Losing Touch"	4:15
2.	"Human"	4:09
3.	"Spaceman"	4:43
4.	"Joy Ride"	3:33
5.	"A Dustland Fairytale"	3:45
6.	"This Is Your Life"	3:41
7.	"I Can't Stay"	3:06
8.	"Neon Tiger"	3:05
9.	"The World We Live In"	4:40
10.	"Goodnight, Travel Well"	6:51

UK, Irish and Australian edition bonus track
No.	Title	Length
11.	"A Crippling Blow"	3:36

Japanese edition bonus tracks
No.	Title	Length
11.	"A Crippling Blow"	3:37
12.	"Forget About What I Said"	2:57

iTunes Store bonus tracks (US and Canada)
No.	Title	Length
11.	"Tidal Wave"	4:13
12.	"Forget About What I Said"	2:57
13.	"Human" (Thin White Duke remix) (pre-order only)

iTunes Store bonus tracks (UK, Japan and Australia)
No.	Title	Length
11.	"A Crippling Blow"	3:36
12.	"Forget About What I Said" (pre-order only)	2:57

10th anniversary edition bonus tracks
No.	Title	Length
11.	"Forget About What I Said"	2:57
12.	"A Crippling Blow"	3:37
13.	"Joy Ride" (night version)	7:16

== Personnel ==
Credits adapted from the liner notes of Day & Age.

=== The Killers ===
- Brandon Flowers
- Dave Keuning
- Mark Stoermer
- Ronnie Vannucci Jr.

=== Additional musicians ===
- Daniel de los Reyes – additional percussion on "Joy Ride" and "I Can't Stay"
- Tommy Marth – saxophone on "Losing Touch", "Joy Ride" and "I Can't Stay"

=== Technical ===
- Stuart Price – production, mixing
- The Killers – production
- Robert Root – engineering
- Dave Emery – mixing assistance
- Alex Dromgoole – mixing assistance
- Ted Sablay – additional engineering on "Spaceman", "This Is Your Life", and "I Can't Stay"
- Tim Young – mastering

=== Artwork ===
- Paul Normansell – artwork, paintings
- Erik Weiss – band photo
- Julian Peploe Studio – package design

=== Studios ===
- Battle Born Studios (Las Vegas, Nevada) – engineering
- Olympic Studios (London) – mixing
- Metropolis Studios (London) – mastering

== Charts ==
=== Weekly charts ===
Chart (2008–2009)	Peak position
Australian Albums (ARIA)	4
Austrian Albums (Ö3 Austria)	9
Belgian Albums (Ultratop Flanders)	12
Belgian Albums (Ultratop Wallonia)	41
Canadian Albums (Billboard)	6
Croatian Albums (HDU)	9
Czech Albums (ČNS IFPI)	30
Danish Albums (Hitlisten)	10
Dutch Albums (Album Top 100)	12
European Albums (Billboard)	2
Finnish Albums (Suomen virallinen lista)	17
French Albums (SNEP)	57
German Albums (Offizielle Top 100)	8
Greek Albums (IFPI)	1
Irish Albums (IRMA)	1
Italian Albums (FIMI)	21
Japanese Albums (Oricon)	26
Mexican Albums (Top 100 Mexico)	3
New Zealand Albums (RMNZ)	2
Norwegian Albums (VG-lista)	1
Polish Albums (ZPAV)	45
Portuguese Albums (AFP)	29
Russian Albums (2M)	14
Scottish Albums (Official Charts)	1
Spanish Albums (Promusicae)	9
Swedish Albums (Sverigetopplistan)	8
Swiss Albums (Schweizer Hitparade)	4
UK Albums (Official Charts)	1
US Billboard 200	6
US Top Alternative Albums (Billboard)	1
US Top Rock Albums (Billboard)	2

=== Year-end charts ===
Chart (2008)	Position
Australian Albums (ARIA)	33
Greek International Albums (IFPI)	16
Irish Albums (IRMA)	16
Mexican Albums (Top 100 Mexico)	28
New Zealand Albums (RMNZ)	37
Swedish Albums (Sverigetopplistan)	78
UK Albums (OCC)	7
Worldwide Albums (IFPI)	28

Chart (2009)	Position
Australian Albums (ARIA)	70
Austrian Albums (Ö3 Austria)	64
Belgian Albums (Ultratop Flanders)	92
Canadian Albums (Billboard)	27
Danish Albums (Hitlisten)	84
European Albums (Billboard)	14
German Albums (Offizielle Top 100)	81
Mexican Albums (Top 100 Mexico)	64
Swiss Albums (Schweizer Hitparade)	72
UK Albums (OCC)	29
US Billboard 200	44
US Top Alternative Albums (Billboard)	10
US Top Rock Albums (Billboard)	15

Chart (2010)	Position
UK Albums (OCC)	171

== Certifications and sales ==
Region	Certification	Certified units/sales
Australia (ARIA)	Platinum	70,000^{^}
Austria (IFPI Austria)	Gold	10,000^{*}
Canada (Music Canada)	Platinum	80,000^{^}
Denmark (IFPI Danmark)	Gold	15,000^{^}
GCC (IFPI Middle East)	Gold	3,000^{*}
Germany (BVMI)	Platinum	200,000^{^}
Greece (IFPI Greece)	Gold	7,500^{^}
Ireland (IRMA)	4× Platinum	60,000^{^}
Mexico (AMPROFON)	Gold	40,000^{^}
New Zealand (RMNZ)	Platinum	15,000^{^}
Norway (IFPI Norway)	Gold	15,000^{*}
Spain (Promusicae)	Gold	40,000^{^}
Sweden (GLF)	Gold	20,000^{^}
Switzerland (IFPI Switzerland)	Gold	15,000^{^}
United Kingdom (BPI)	4× Platinum	1,310,000
United States (RIAA)	Platinum	1,000,000^{‡}
Summaries
Europe (IFPI)	Platinum	1,000,000^{*}
Worldwide	—	3,000,000
^{*} Sales figures based on certification alone.^{^} Shipments figures based on certification alone.^{‡} Sales+streaming figures based on certification alone.

== Release history ==
Region	Date	Format	Label	Catalog
United States, Canada	November 18, 2008	LP; digital download	Island	B0012197-01
Japan	November 19, 2008	CD; digital download	Universal	UICL-1085
Italy	November 21, 2008	CD; digital download	Universal	602517872875
Australia	November 22, 2008	CD; digital download	Universal	1785121
United Kingdom	November 24, 2008	Digital download	Vertigo	
United Kingdom	November 24, 2008	CD	Vertigo	1785121
United Kingdom	November 24, 2008	LP	Vertigo	1785123
United States, Canada	November 25, 2008	CD	Island	B0012197-02
