= Ted Sablay =

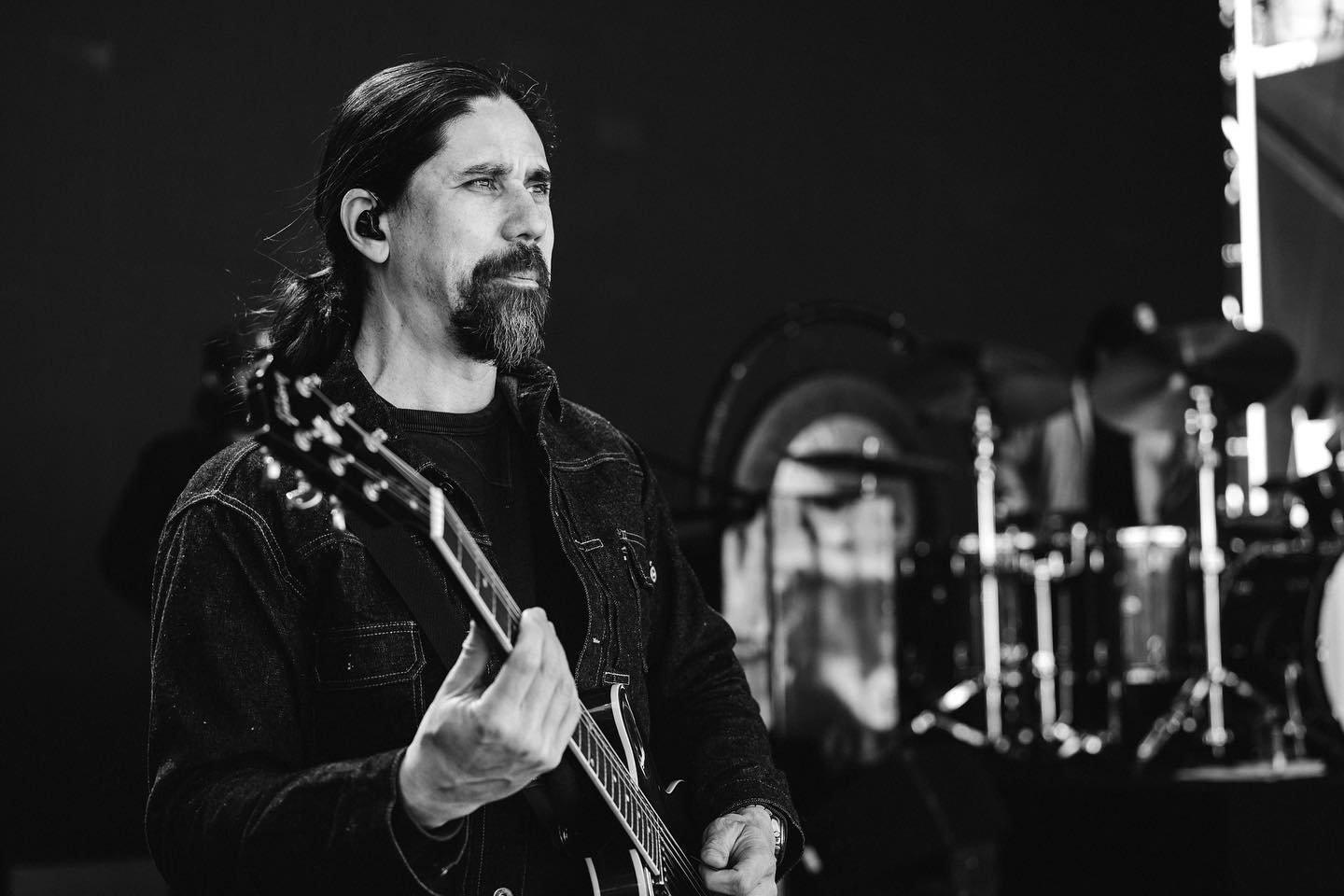
- Ted Sablay, 2023

Background information
- Born: April 18, 1976 (age 50); Fond du Lac, Wisconsin, US
- Genre: Rock
- Occupations: Musician, guitarist
- Instruments: Guitar, vocals, keyboards, piano, bass guitar
- Years active: 1994–present
- Website: tedsablay.com

Theodore Sablay (born April 18, 1976) is an American musician, musical director and songwriter. He has been a touring guitarist and keyboardist for The Killers since 2006 and musical director for the band's live concerts since 2022.

== Early life ==
Sablay was born in 1976 in Fond du Lac, Wisconsin, the son of Nonito Sablay, a physician, and Maureen Sablay, a nurse and homemaker. His father also played piano and while his mother and siblings loved pop music. Sablay studied classical piano for four years as a child and switched to guitar at age 12. As a teenager, Sablay became interested in live music after seeing concerts by INXS, Steve Winwood, David Bowie and Tom Petty and the Heartbreakers and decided to become a performer after seeing U2 and Paul McCartney. Educated at the University of Nevada Las Vegas, Sablay played in various local bands while in college during the 1990s, including Attaboy Skip with Killers drummer Ronnie Vannucci and Neon Trees bassist Branden Campbell and Expert On October with Vannucci and fellow Killers touring guitarist Taylor Milne. Sablay graduated from UNLV with a dual B.A. in Anthropology and Asian Studies and master's degree in accounting.

== Music career ==
=== The Killers ===
Sablay played piano on "Romeo and Juliet" on the band's compilation album Sawdust, engineered sessions for the Killers' 2008 album Day & Age, worked as a music consultant on Flamingo, the 2010 solo album by Killers singer Brandon Flowers, and played lead guitar on "Dustland," the 2021 Killers collaboration with Bruce Springsteen.

Sablay contributed bass to Vannucci's side project Big Talk and Flowers' second solo album, The Desired Effect. In 2017, Sablay was picked to fill in for Dave Keuning on lead guitar during live dates supporting the Killers' album, Wonderful Wonderful. In 2022, Sablay became The Killers music director, supervising musical arrangements for live concerts. He currently switches between lead and rhythm guitar during Killers concerts when the band's main guitarist Dave Keuning is absent.

=== Solo career ===
In 2021, while remaining a touring musician for the Killers, Sablay began his solo career, releasing the singles "Just Out of Reach" and "Fall Out of Love." In 2022, Sablay released his first solo album, You'll Be Back Here Soon, amassing over 500,000 Spotify streams as of October 2022.

Las Vegas Weekly wrote that the album is “an impressive debut that warrants immediate, repeated plays” and the song "I Only Care About You" as one of its favorite local songs of the year. Divide and Conquer Magazine gave the "You'll Be Back Here Soon" 4.2 out of 5 stars, describing the album as being "everything a rock record should be: well-constructed songs, accessible melodies, shifting textures and tones.".

In 2023, Sablay began touring throughout the United States, opening a number of dates for The Killers, The Wallflowers and Chris Isaak.

In September 2026, Sablay released his second solo album, State & Motion. The record features drummer Pete Thomas of Elvis Costello's backing band The Attractions and bassist Whynot Jansveld, with contributions from about a dozen other musicians. Glide Magazine premiered the album in full ahead of its September 25 release. The Las Vegas Review-Journal called it "a searching, big-hearted record," and Las Vegas Weekly wrote that "every lyric has a job to do and every melody counts." Writing in Rock and Roll Globe, Ron Hart described the record as being "about the difference between bearing something and choosing something."

Sablay has said the album originated at a December 2023 show opening for Chris Isaak, at which he debuted the song "Baby I Need You."

== Personal life ==
Sablay married Sheena Mercier in 2017 and lives in Las Vegas, Nevada. Their daughter Georgia Sablay was born on February 13, 2026.

== Musical influences ==
According to an official FAQ, Sablay's influences include The Beatles, The Rolling Stones, Paul McCartney, John Lennon, U2, The Smiths, Johnny Marr, Oasis, Noel Gallagher, The Kinks, Tom Petty, The Wallflowers, Sade, Paul Simon, Tom Waits, Talking Heads, David Byrne, Mark Knopfler, The War On Drugs and Supergrass.
