= Big Talk (band) =

American rock band

- Origin: Las Vegas, Nevada, U.S.
- Genres: Indie rock, country rock, post-grunge
- Years active: 2011–present
- Label: Little Oil / Epitaph / Pledge
- Members: Ronnie Vannucci Jr. Taylor Milne; John Spiker; John Konesky; Brooks Wackerman
- Website: bigtalkmusic.com

Big Talk is an American rock band formed by The Killers' drummer Ronnie Vannucci Jr. and longtime friend Taylor Milne in 2011. As of 2015, John Spiker, John Konesky and Brooks Wackerman are also members of the band. The band have released an eponymous debut album Big Talk (2011), with follow-up Straight In No Kissin' released in 2015.

== History ==
=== Formation ===
After touring and releasing albums for nearly nine years, Ronnie Vannucci Jr. of The Killers and his bandmates went on hiatus. Shortly, he enlisted the help of a longtime friend and former band member (from Expert on October) Taylor Milne to record a solo album. Matt Sharp and Ted Sablay (formerly of Expert on October) also helped contribute bass parts to the album.

The band's live lineup on their first tour consisted of Ronnie Vannucci on vocals and guitar; Taylor Milne on guitar; Alex Stopa on drums; Tyson Henrie on bass; and John Spiker on keyboards, guitar and background vocals. In May 2015, live shows in support of the new album consisted of band members Ronnie Vannucci on vocals and guitar; Taylor Milne on guitar and backing vocals; John Spiker on bass, keyboards and backing vocals; John Konesky on guitar and keyboards; and Brooks Wackerman on drums.

=== Big Talk (2011) ===
Grammy Award-winning producer Joe Chiccarelli (The Strokes, My Morning Jacket, The Shins) worked with the band on their debut album. It was recorded between November 2010 and January 2011 at Battle Born Studios, and was then mixed at London's Assault & Battery Studios by Alan Moulder (U2, The Killers, Foo Fighters, Smashing Pumpkins). Former Weezer bassist Matt Sharp and Ted Sablay (who toured with The Killers) also helped out on the album.

The first single, "Getaways", was released on May 10, 2011. Big Talk released its eponymous debut album on July 12, 2011, on Vannucci's own label 'Little Oil' in association with Epitaph Records. It first streamed in full via Much Music on July 12, 2011, and then on ABC's Music Lounge on July 13, 2011. NME streamed the album exclusively.

Big Talk made their live television debut on Jimmy Kimmel Live! on July 25, 2011.

=== Straight In No Kissin' (2015) ===
For Big Talk's second album, Vannucci and collaborator John Spiker (of Tenacious D) produced the album in a basement studio Vannucci built. The band lineup now officially includes John Konesky (guitar), John Spiker (bass), and Brooks Wackerman (of Bad Religion, drums).

The first single, "What Happened to Delisa?" was released in June 2015. Straight In No Kissin' was released on July 24, 2015; the album's cover features artwork of the five band members in drag accompanied by Vannucci's pet boxer Archie.

== Personnel ==
Studio

- Ronnie Vannucci Jr. – lead vocals, rhythm guitar, bass, keyboard, drums, percussion
- Taylor Milne – lead guitar, backing vocals
- John Spiker – bass
- John Konesky – guitar
- Brooks Wackerman – drums, percussion
- Archie Vannucci – mascot

Live

- Ronnie Vannucci Jr. – lead vocals, rhythm guitar
- Taylor Milne – lead guitar, backing vocals
- John Spiker – bass, keyboard, guitar, backing vocals

Since 2015

- John Konesky – keyboard, guitar
- Brooks Wackerman – drums, percussion

Former live members (2011)

- Tyson Henrie – bass, backing vocals
- Alex Stopa – drums, percussion, backing vocals

== Discography ==
=== Albums ===
- Big Talk (2011)
- Straight In No Kissin' (2015)
