= Straight In No Kissin' =

Studio album by Big Talk
- Released: July 24, 2015
- Recorded: 2014–2015
- Studio: Ronnie Vannucci Jr.'s home studio (Sonoma County, California); Battle Born (Las Vegas)
- Genre: Indie rock, comedy rock
- Length: 39:15
- Label: Little Oil Records/Pledge Music
- Producer: Ronnie Vannucci Jr., John Spiker

Big Talk chronology
Big Talk (2011)	Straight In No Kissin' (2015)

Singles from Big Talk
- 1. "What Happened to Delisa?" Released: May 2015; 2. "I've Been Sentimental Lately" Released: July 2015

Professional ratings
Review scores
Source	Rating
NME	7/10 stars

Straight In No Kissin' is the second studio album by the American rock band Big Talk. It was released worldwide on July 24, 2015.

== Track listing ==
All tracks written by John Konesky, Taylor Milne, John Spiker, Ronnie Vannucci Jr. and Brooks Wackerman.

No.	Title	Length
1.	"Hold That Line"	3:59
2.	"Animal Husband"	4:15
3.	"What Happened to Delisa?"	3:57
4.	"La Rue D'Awakening"	2:39
5.	"Cocktail Party"	3:58
6.	"I've Been Sentimental Lately"	3:59
7.	"What the Night Can Do"	4:34
8.	"All My Luvin'"	2:54
9.	"The Void"	3:25
10.	"Another Satellite"	2:21
11.	"Neon's Not Enough Light"	3:14
Total length:		39:15

== Personnel ==
- Ronnie Vannucci Jr. – vocals, rhythm guitar, keyboards
- Taylor Milne – lead guitar
- John Konesky – rhythm and lead guitar
- John Spiker – bass
- Brooks Wackerman – drums
