= Big Talk (album) =

Studio album by Big Talk
- Released: July 19, 2011
- Recorded: November 2010 and January 2011
- Studios: Battle Born, Las Vegas, Nevada.
- Genre: Indie rock
- Length: 43:44; 48:15 (Deluxe Edition)
- Label: Epitaph
- Producers: Joe Chiccarelli, Ronnie Vannucci Jr.

Big Talk chronology
Big Talk (2011)	Straight In No Kissin' (2015)

Singles from Big Talk
- 1. "Getaways" Released: May 11, 2011; 2. "Replica" Released: July 20, 2011; 3. "Big Eye" Released: October 14, 2011

Big Talk is the debut album by the American indie rock band Big Talk. It was produced by Joe Chiccarelli and Ronnie Vannucci, Jr. and released on July 19, 2011, through Epitaph Records.

== Reception ==
Professional ratings
Aggregate scores
Source	Rating
Metacritic	58/100
Review scores
Source	Rating
AllMusic	3.5/5 stars
Consequence of Sound	3.5/5 stars
The Guardian	2/5 stars
Las Vegas Weekly	3/5 stars
NME	7/10 stars
The Scotsman	3/5 stars
The Telegraph	3/5 stars

Spin's William Goodman wrote "While Brandon Flowers has been largely credited with the Killers' infectious rock melodies and hooks, it now appears that the band's secret weapon was sitting behind the drum kit." He continues that single "Getaways" is "an anthemic electro-rock jam with glistening synths and an upbeat, fun '80s feel, but in a way catchier (and better) way..."

The album was described by Digital Spy as the "rock club-shaped soundtrack to the summer".

David West of Rhythm Magazine wrote of tracks "Getaways" and "Replica" that "they rocked". He cites "Sharp riffs, great vocals, and of course the driving power that gives The Killers their lethal edge," as reasons for his positive review.

Spinner's Theo Spielberg wrote, "Not straying far from the synth-rock brand of music the Killers peddle, Big Talk throws out epic hooks, anthemic riffs and '80s-style feel-goodery with effortless conviction. At times, Vannucci sounds uncannily like bandmate Brandon Flowers. However, he also tries his hand at dirty Spaghetti Western tunes ('No Whiskey') as well as Wilco-ish alt-country rock ('Girls at Sunrise') with the same tangible delight of exploration he demonstrates simply by stepping out from behind the drums."

Simon Price of the British newspaper The Independent wrote, "It's much more fun than the Brandon Flowers album. Which, admittedly, isn't very big talk at all."

=== Accolades ===
Publication	Country	Accolade	Year	Rank
NME	UK	Best Albums of 2011 (Editors' Pick)	2011	#24

== Track listing ==
All tracks are written by Ronnie Vanucci Jr, except where noted.

No.	Title	Writer(s)	Length
1.	"Katzenjammer"		4:46
2.	"Getaways"		3:22
3.	"Under Water"		4:28
4.	"The Next One Living"		3:27
5.	"Replica"		3:58
6.	"No Whiskey"	Taylor Milne, Vannucci	3:55
7.	"Girl at Sunrise"	Milne, Vannucci	3:37
8.	"White Dove"		2:35
9.	"Living in Pictures"		2:33
10.	"Hunting Season"		3:45
11.	"A Fine Time to Need Me"		3:24
12.	"Big Eye"		3:54
Total length:			43:44

Deluxe Edition
No.	Title	Length
13.	"Hey Marie"	4:22
14.	"The Hooker"	3:29
Total length:		48:15

== Personnel ==
- Ronnie Vannucci Jr. – lead vocals, rhythm guitar, bass, keyboards, drums
- Taylor Milne – lead guitar, backing vocals
- Joe Chiccarelli – production
