= Ronnie Vannucci Jr. =

American drummer (born 1976)

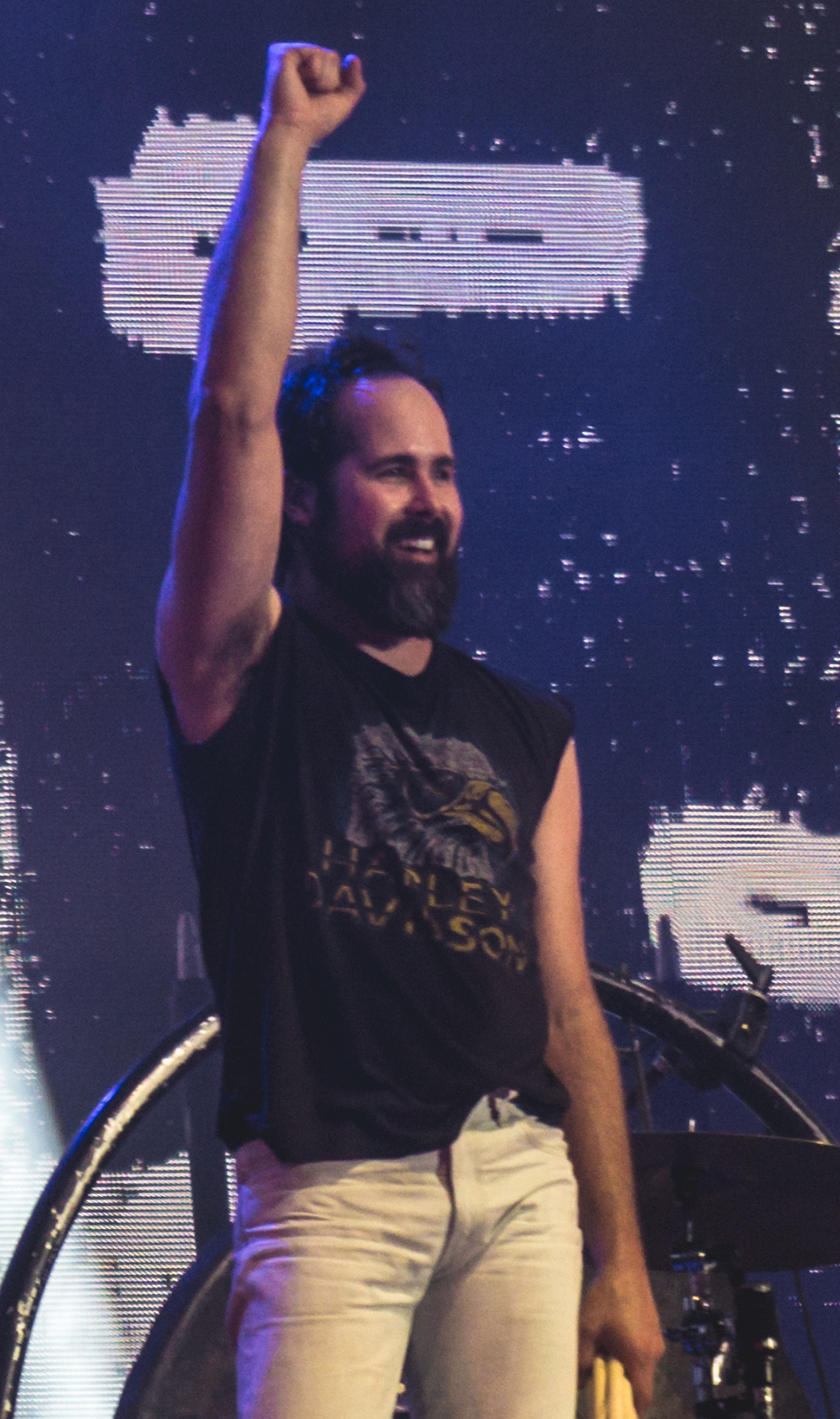
- Vannucci in 2017

Background information
- Born: Ronald Vannucci Jr. February 15, 1976 (age 50); Las Vegas, Nevada, U.S.
- Genres: Alternative rock; pop rock; post-punk revival; new wave; heartland rock
- Occupation: Musician
- Instrument: Drums
- Years active: 2002–present
- Member of: The Killers; Big Talk; The Rentals
- Formerly of: Attaboy Skip; Mt. Desolation
- Website: thekillersmusic.com

Ronald Vannucci Jr. (born February 15, 1976) is an American musician, best known for being the drummer for the rock band the Killers. He is also involved in a side project called Big Talk and became the drummer of the Rentals in 2018.

== Early life ==
Vannucci was born in Las Vegas to an American couple with Italian, French, and German ancestry. He began drumming at the age of six. He was a part of his junior high school's jazz ensemble and later attended both Clark and Western High Schools. Vannucci played in various local bands. His first band was Purple Dirt.

Vannucci drummed for several local bands, including ska-punk group Attaboy Skip, who enjoyed regional success in the mid-1990s and featured Branden Campbell (of Neon Trees); Free Food, a cover band who played at prisons and homeless shelters in the Las Vegas area; and Expert On October, a band that also included Ted Sablay and Taylor Milne (of Big Talk).

== Career ==
=== The Killers (2002–present) ===
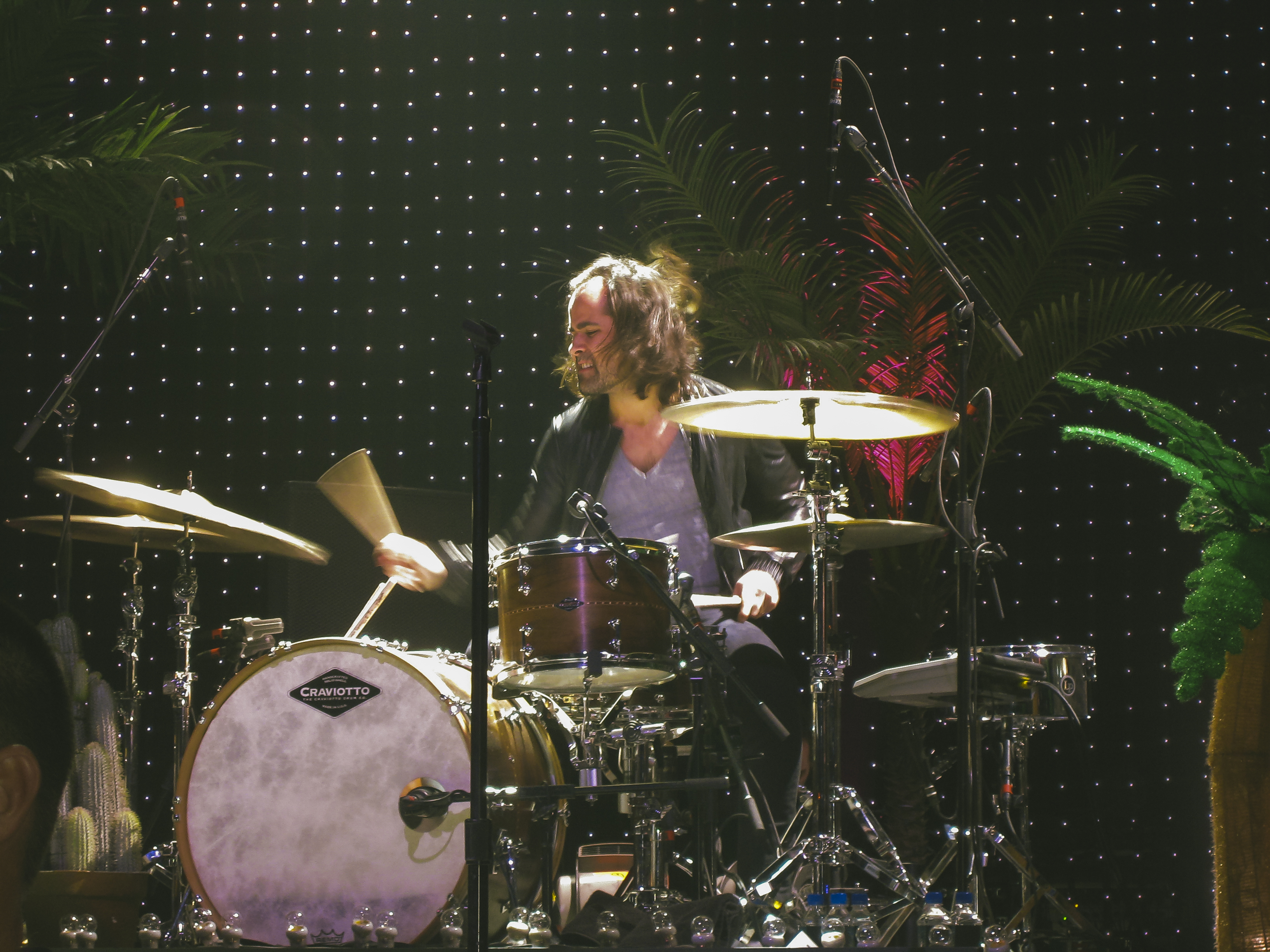
Vannucci playing for the Killers Day & Age World Tour (2009)

Vannucci studied classical percussion at UNLV, while also working as a photographer at Chapel of the Flowers, a wedding chapel on Las Vegas Boulevard. He was performing with a local group, Romance Fantasy, when he met Brandon Flowers and Dave Keuning, who had recently begun performing as the Killers. He joined the Killers in August 2002. The band would practice at Vannucci's garage, and he would also sneak the band into the Alta Ham Fine Arts Building at UNLV at night to practice. He later completed his bachelor's degree at UNLV on May 14, 2011, while the Killers were on hiatus. The Killers have released six consecutive No. 1 albums in the United Kingdom, sold over 22 million records worldwide, and have been nominated for seven Grammy Awards and seven BRIT Awards.

=== Big Talk (2011–present) ===
Vannucci recorded a side project album during 2010–2011 and titled it Big Talk, aiming with tongue-in-cheek at the abundance of music being put out by labels before it is being fully prepared. NME named the eponymous album #24 on its Best Albums of 2011 list. Big Talk was mixed by Alan Moulder and recorded at Battle Born Studios with Joe Chiccarelli as producer. Matt Sharp (of Weezer and the Rentals) and long time friend Taylor Milne were enlisted to help record the album. Little Oil / Epitaph Records released the album on July 12, 2011. Big Talk was preceded by a single, "Getaways", on May 10, 2011. Vannucci was listed at #49 on NME's Cool List of 2011.

In 2015, Big Talk released their second album, Straight In No Kissin'.

=== Other projects ===
Vannucci has also contributed to Mt. Desolation, a side project of Keane members Tim Rice-Oxley and Jessie Quin, on acoustic guitar and percussion, and has also contributed to fellow Killers member Brandon Flowers.

== Playing style ==
Vannucci mainly plays with his kit set up using a jazz technique with a high stool and hitched-up snare stand. He attributes this to his 6 ft 1 frame, a former teacher who whipped him, and the examples of great drummers including Mitch Mitchell and many jazz performers.

Vannucci is known for crashing his hi-hats, skillful sixteenth notes, and a fluid playing style. Drummer Magazine labels them a "few distinctive hallmarks [that] help characterize Ronnie's style".

Vannucci and his bandmate, bass guitarist Mark Stoermer, have what they consider a rewarding relationship musically. Of Stoermer, Vannucci has said, "He almost intuitively knows what I am going to play and his parts are so rhythmic it's a joy to dance around him I really enjoy thinking up parts with him. . . it works very well for us."

Vannucci was featured on the cover of Rhythm Magazine in October 2006, (where he was dubbed "pop's dynamic showman") and again in November 2008 and October 2012. He was also featured on Drummer Magazine in June 2009 and Modern Drummer Magazine in 2013. He was featured in Modern Drummer Magazine in March 2009 and in Drumhead Magazine, September 2008 and again in October 2008.

=== Influences ===
Vannucci cites influences such as jazz legend Papa Jo Jones, Mitch Mitchell of the Jimi Hendrix Experience, Neil Peart of Rush, Keith Moon of the Who, and John Bonham of Led Zeppelin. He also lists as influences the Cure, U2, Depeche Mode and more modern drummers including Charley Drayton, Steve Jordan, and Ahmir Thompson.

== Equipment ==
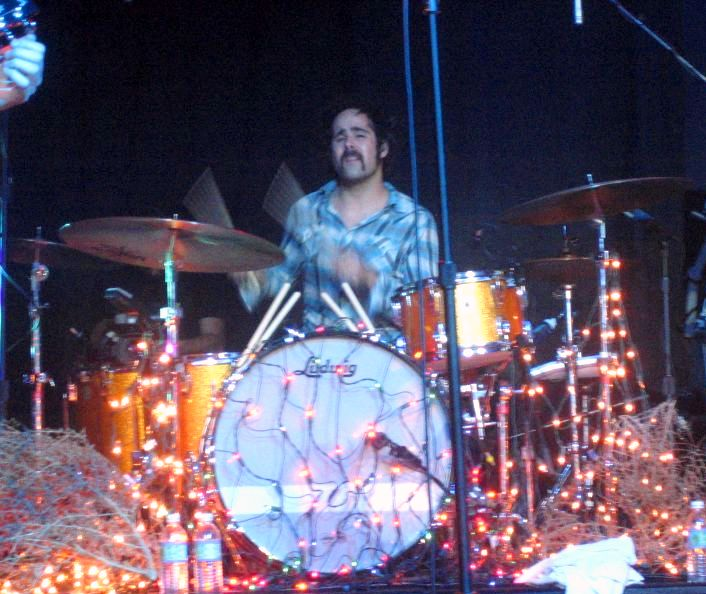
Vannucci performing in 2006

Vannucci currently uses Craviotto drums, DW pedals and hardware, Remo heads and Istanbul Agop cymbals. Vannucci previously endorsed and used Zildjian cymbals. While with Zildjian, he also had signature model drumsticks that have since been discontinued. After leaving Zildjian, he switched to Innovative Percussion drumsticks, debuting a brand new signature model along with a signature model bass drum beater. His current set-up is as follows:

Cymbals

- 15" 30th Anniversary Hi-Hats
- 22" Traditional Medium Crash
- 22" Traditional Dark Crash
- 24" Joey Waronker Ride (or a 24" 30th Anniversary Ride)
- 22" Traditional Swish Cymbal (with rivets)

Drums

- 9x13 Rack Tom
- 16x16 Floor Tom
- 16x18 Floor Tom
- 7x14 Snare
- 15x24 Bass Drum

== Personal life ==
Vannucci married Lisa Ann Yoakum on May 2, 2003. They had one pet dog, a boxer named Archie. Archie gained notoriety during the recording of Big Talk due to Vannucci's frequently tweeted pictures of him in the studio. He also enjoys ranching in his free time. Vannucci and Yoakum divorced in 2016.

== Discography ==
=== With the Killers ===
- Hot Fuss (2004)
- Sam's Town (2006)
- Day & Age (2008)
- Battle Born (2012)
- Wonderful Wonderful (2017)
- Imploding the Mirage (2020)
- Pressure Machine (2021)

=== With Big Talk ===
- Big Talk (2011)
- Straight In No Kissin' (2015)

=== Other appearances ===
- "Departure" – Mt. Desolation (2010)
- "Midnight Ghost" – Mt. Desolation (2010)
- "Playing with Fire" – Flamingo (2010)
- "Untangled Love" – The Desired Effect (2015)
- "An American Dream" – Thrasher (2026)

== Awards and accolades ==
- University of Nevada Las Vegas College of Fine Arts Alumnus of the Year and Hall of Fame Inductee (2014)
- Modern Drummers Reader Poll (2006) – Winner
- Modern Drummers Reader Poll (2007) – Winner
