= Wonderful Wonderful World Tour =

2017–18 concert tour by the Killers

- Tour by The Killers
- Promotional poster for the tour
- Associated album: Wonderful Wonderful
- Start date: February 11, 2017
- End date: September 19, 2018
- Legs: 10
- No. of shows: 54 in Europe; 52 in North America; 12 in Latin America; 12 in Oceania; 5 in Asia; 135 in total

The Killers concert chronology
- Battle Born World Tour (2012–14); Wonderful Wonderful World Tour (2017–18); Imploding the Mirage Tour (2021–23)

The Wonderful Wonderful World Tour was the fifth major concert tour by the American rock band The Killers, in support of their fifth studio album Wonderful Wonderful, which was released on September 22, 2017. The tour included dates in 34 countries of Europe, Asia, the Americas, and Oceania.

== History ==
Confetti falls during the Sydney, Australia concert in April 2018.

Throughout the summer of 2017, The Killers played festivals across Europe and North America as well as performances in smaller venues. At many of these shows, the band previewed several new songs from the then-upcoming album Wonderful Wonderful including the singles "The Man" and "Run for Cover". On August 28, 2017, the band announced on its website and via Instagram and Twitter posts that guitarist Dave Keuning and bassist Mark Stoermer would not be present on the tour; guitarist/keyboardist Ted Sablay and bassist/keyboardist/guitarist Jake Blanton, both of whom have toured with the band in the past, would fill in for Keuning and Stoermer respectively. The band also added more touring musicians: Robbie Connolly (keyboards, guitar), Taylor Milne (guitar, keyboards) and backing vocalists Erica Canales, Danielle Withers and Amanda Brown. On December 1, 2017, Keuning and Stoermer performed with the band in Las Vegas for the Vegas Strong Benefit Concert, raising money for victims of the October 1 music festival shooting.

== Setlist ==
=== First set list ===
This set list is representative of the show on November 13, 2017 in Manchester. It is not intended to represent all shows from the tour.

1. "Wonderful Wonderful"
2. "The Man"
3. "Somebody Told Me"
4. "Spaceman"
5. "Run for Cover"
6. "I Can't Stay"
7. "Smile Like You Mean It"
8. "For Reasons Unknown"
9. "Shadowplay" (Joy Division cover)
10. "Rut"
11. "Tyson vs. Douglas"
12. "Human"
13. "This River is Wild"
14. "A Dustland Fairytale"
15. "Be Still"
16. "Runaways"
17. "Read My Mind"
18. "All These Things That I've Done"

Encore:

1. "The Calling"
2. "Believe Me Natalie"
3. "When You Were Young"
4. "Mr. Brightside"

=== Second set list ===
This set list is representative of the show on November 27, 2017 in London. It is not intended to represent all shows from the tour.

1. "Wonderful Wonderful"
2. "Read My Mind"
3. "Spaceman"
4. "The Way It Was"
5. "Shot at the Night"
6. "Run for Cover"
7. "Jenny Was A Friend of Mine"
8. "Somebody Told Me"
9. "Bling (Confession of a King)"
10. "Shadowplay" (Joy Division cover)
11. "Rut"
12. "Smile Like You Mean It"
13. "For Reasons Unknown"
14. "The Man"
15. "Tyson vs. Douglas"
16. "A Dustland Fairytale"
17. "Runaways"
18. "All These Things That I've Done"
19. "When You Were Young"

Encore:

1. "Bizarre Love Triangle" (New Order cover)
2. "Human"
3. "Mr. Brightside" (Jacques Lu Cont Thin White Duke Remix)/"Mr. Brightside" (original album version)

=== Third set list ===
This set list is representative of the show on December 11, 2017 in Las Vegas. It is not intended to represent all shows from the tour.

1. "The Man"
2. "Somebody Told Me"
3. "Spaceman"
4. "The Way It Was"
5. "Run for Cover"
6. "Smile Like You Mean It"
7. "For Reasons Unknown"
8. "Bling (Confession of a King)"
9. "Human"
10. "Rut"
11. "A Dustland Fairytale"
12. "Home Means Nevada" (Traditional song)
13. "Runaways"
14. "Read My Mind"
15. "All These Things That I've Done"
16. "When You Were Young"

Encore:

1. "Jenny Was A Friend of Mine"
2. "Under the Gun"
3. "Mr. Brightside"

== Personnel ==
=== The Killers ===
- Brandon Flowers – lead vocals, keyboards, piano, bass on "For Reasons Unknown"
- Dave Keuning – lead guitar, background vocals (Note: Keuning and Stoermer only appeared together from February 11-August 4, 2017 and at the December 1, 2017 show in Las Vegas. Stoermer made additional appearances at some warm-up dates and the Glastonbury Festival on June 25, 2017.)
- Mark Stoermer – bass, rhythm guitar on "For Reasons Unknown", background vocals
- Ronnie Vannucci Jr. – drums, percussion

=== Additional musicians ===
- Ted Sablay – lead guitar, rhythm guitar, keyboards, background vocals
- Jake Blanton – bass, keyboards, rhythm guitar, background vocals
- Taylor Milne – rhythm guitar, keyboards, background vocals
- Robbie Connolly – keyboards, rhythm guitar, background vocals
- Erica Canales – background vocals
- Danielle Withers – background vocals
- Amanda Brown – background vocals

== Tour dates ==
| Date | City | Country | Venue |
|---|---|---|---|
Warm Up Dates
| February 11, 2017 | Orlando | United States | Orange County Convention Center |
| March 31, 2017 | Monterrey | Mexico | Parque Fundidora |
| June 10, 2017 | Atlantic City | United States | Borgata Casino |
| June 11, 2017 | Camden | United States | BB&T Pavilion |
| June 22, 2017 | Odense | Denmark | Tusindårsskoven |
| June 24, 2017 | Piraeus | Greece | Ejekt Festival |
| June 25, 2017 | Pilton | England | Glastonbury Festival |
| June 29, 2017 | Seinäjoki | Finland | Provinssirock |
| July 1, 2017 | Norrköping | Sweden | Bråvalla festival |
| July 5, 2017 | Novi Sad | Serbia | EXIT festival |
| July 7, 2017 | Bilbao | Spain | Bilbao BBK Live |
| July 8, 2017 | London | England | British Summer Time |
| July 31, 2017 | Las Vegas | United States | Caesars Palace |
| August 2, 2017 | Milwaukee | United States | Eagles Ballroom |
| August 4, 2017 | Chicago | United States | Lollapalooza |
| September 12, 2017 | London | England | Brixton Academy |
| September 15, 2017 | Cologne | Germany | Live Music Hall |
| September 19, 2017 | Brooklyn | United States | Brooklyn Steel |
| September 22, 2017 | New York City | United States | Terminal 5 |
| September 23, 2017 | New York City | United States | Global Citizen Festival |
| September 29, 2017 | Melbourne | Australia | Howler |
| September 30, 2017 | Melbourne | Australia | 2017 AFL Grand Final |
| October 8, 2017 | Austin | United States | Austin City Limits Music Festival |
| October 12, 2017 | Austin | United States | Continental Club |
| October 15, 2017 | Austin | United States | Austin City Limits Music Festival |
| October 21, 2017 | Phoenix | United States | Lost Lake Festival |
| October 29, 2017 | New Orleans | United States | Voodoo Experience |
Europe
| November 6, 2017 | Birmingham | England | Genting Arena |
| November 7, 2017 | Birmingham | England | Genting Arena |
| November 9, 2017 | Liverpool | England | Echo Arena |
| November 10, 2017 | Newcastle | England | Metro Radio Arena |
| November 13, 2017 | Manchester | England | Manchester Arena |
| November 14, 2017 | Manchester | England | Manchester Arena |
| November 16, 2017 | Dublin | Ireland | 3Arena |
| November 17, 2017 | Belfast | Ireland | SSE Arena |
| November 19, 2017 | Leeds | England | First Direct Arena |
| November 20, 2017 | Glasgow | Scotland | The SSE Hydro |
| November 21, 2017 | Aberdeen | Scotland | BHGE Arena |
| November 23, 2017 | Nottingham | England | Motorpoint Arena Nottingham |
| November 25, 2017 | Sheffield | England | FlyDSA Arena |
| November 27, 2017 | London | England | The O_{2} Arena |
| November 28, 2017 | London | England | The O_{2} Arena |
North America
| December 1, 2017 | Las Vegas | United States | T-Mobile Arena ^{[A]} |
| December 5, 2017 | Seattle | United States | KeyArena |
| December 6, 2017 | Vancouver | Canada | Thunderbird Sports Centre |
| December 7, 2017 | Portland | United States | Theater of the Clouds |
| December 9, 2017 | Oakland | United States | Oracle Arena |
| December 10, 2017 | Inglewood | United States | The Forum |
| December 11, 2017 | Las Vegas | United States | Pearl Concert Theater |
| January 5, 2018 | Toronto | Canada | Air Canada Centre |
| January 6, 2018 | Laval | Canada | Place Bell |
| January 7, 2018 | Boston | United States | TD Garden |
| January 9, 2018 | Brooklyn | United States | Barclays Center |
| January 10, 2018 | Washington, D.C. | United States | The Anthem |
| January 12, 2018 | New York City | United States | Madison Square Garden |
| January 13, 2018 | Philadelphia | United States | Wells Fargo Center |
| January 15, 2018 | Detroit | United States | Detroit Masonic Temple |
| January 16, 2018 | Chicago | United States | United Center |
| January 17, 2018 | Saint Paul | United States | Xcel Energy Center |
| January 19, 2018 | St. Louis | United States | Chaifetz Arena |
| January 21, 2018 | Duluth | United States | Infinite Energy Arena |
| January 23, 2018 | Miami | United States | American Airlines Arena |
| January 24, 2018 | Orlando | United States | Hard Rock Live |
| January 26, 2018 | Sugar Land | United States | Smart Financial Centre |
| January 27, 2018 | Irving | United States | The Pavilion |
| January 30, 2018 | San Diego | United States | Valley View Casino Center |
| February 1, 2018 | Los Angeles | United States | Staples Center |
| February 2, 2018 | Los Angeles | United States | Staples Center |
| February 3, 2018 | Las Vegas | United States | MGM Grand Garden Arena |
| February 5, 2018 | Broomfield | United States | 1stBank Center |
| February 6, 2018 | Salt Lake City | United States | Vivint Smart Home Arena |
Europe
| February 23, 2018 | Oslo | Norway | Telenor Arena |
| February 24, 2018 | Stockholm | Sweden | Ericsson Globe |
| February 25, 2018 | Copenhagen | Denmark | Royal Arena |
| February 27, 2018 | Berlin | Germany | Mercedes-Benz Arena |
| February 28, 2018 | Amsterdam | Netherlands | Ziggo Dome |
| March 1, 2018 | Esch-sur-Alzette | Luxembourg | Rockhal |
| March 3, 2018 | Paris | France | Zénith Paris |
| March 5, 2018 | Cologne | Germany | Lanxess Arena |
| March 6, 2018 | Antwerp | Belgium | Sportpaleis |
Latin America
| March 15, 2018 | Alajuela | Costa Rica | Anfiteatro Coca-Cola |
| March 17, 2018 (Note: This concert is a part of Lollapalooza Argentina.) | San Isidro | Argentina | Hipódromo de San Isidro |
| March 18, 2018 (Note: This concert is a part of Lollapalooza Chile.) | Santiago | Chile | O'Higgins Park |
| March 21, 2018 (Note: This concert is a part of Asunciónico Festival.) | Asunción | Paraguay | Espacio Idesa |
| March 23, 2018 (Note: This concert is a part of Estéreo Picnic Festival.) | Bogotá | Colombia | Parque Deportivo 222 |
| March 25, 2018 (Note: This concert is a part of Lollapalooza Brazil.) | São Paulo | Brazil | Autódromo José Carlos Pace |
| March 27, 2018 | Lima | Peru | Jockey Club del Perú |
| April 2, 2018 | Monterrey | Mexico | Arena Monterrey |
| April 3, 2018 | Monterrey | Mexico | Arena Monterrey |
| April 5, 2018 | Mexico City | Mexico | Foro Sol |
| April 7, 2018 (Note: This concert is a part of Corona Capital Guadalajara.) | Guadalajara | Mexico | Foro Alterno |
Oceania
| April 20, 2018 | Auckland | New Zealand | Spark Arena |
| April 21, 2018 | Wellington | New Zealand | TSB Bank Arena |
| April 24, 2018 | Christchurch | New Zealand | Horncastle Arena |
| April 27, 2018 | Brisbane | Australia | Brisbane Entertainment Centre |
| April 28, 2018 | Sydney | Australia | Qudos Bank Arena |
| May 1, 2018 | Perth | Australia | Perth Arena |
| May 4, 2018 | Melbourne | Australia | Hisense Arena |
| May 5, 2018 | Melbourne | Australia | Hisense Arena |
| May 6, 2018 | Melbourne | Australia | Hisense Arena |
| May 8, 2018 | Adelaide | Australia | Adelaide Entertainment Centre |
North America
| May 18, 2018 (Note: This concert is a part of Hangout Music Festival.) | Gulf Shores | United States | 101 East Beach Boulevard |
| May 25, 2018 (Note: This concert is a part of Boston Calling Music Festival.) | Boston | United States | City Hall Plaza |
| May 26, 2018 (Note: This concert is a part of BottleRock Napa Valley.) | Napa | United States | Napa Valley Expo |
| June 8, 2018 | Noblesville | United States | Ruoff Home Mortgage Music Center |
| June 10, 2018 (Note: This concert is a part of Bonnaroo Music and Arts Festival.) | Manchester | United States | Great Stage Park |
| June 15, 2018 (Note: This concert is a part of Firefly Music Festival.) | Dover | United States | Dover Motor Speedway |
Europe
| June 20, 2018 | Rome | Italy | Rock in Roma |
| June 21, 2018 | Milan | Italy | Area Expo |
| June 23, 2018 | Swansea | Wales | Liberty Stadium |
| June 24, 2018 | Newport | England | Seaclose Park |
| June 26, 2018 | Dublin | Ireland | RDS Arena |
| June 28, 2018 | Saint Gallen | Switzerland | Saint Gallen Open Air |
| June 29, 2018 | Lisbon | Portugal | Rock in Rio Lisboa |
| June 30, 2018 | Santiago De Compostela | Spain | O Son Do Camiño |
| July 6, 2018 | Werchter | Belgium | Rock Werchter |
| July 8, 2018 | Glasgow | Scotland | Glasgow Green |
| July 8, 2018 | Glasgow | Scotland | King Tut's Wah Wah Hut |
| July 13, 2018 | Bolton | England | Macron Stadium |
| July 14, 2018 | Southwold | England | Latitude Festival |
| July 18, 2018 | Nyon | Switzerland | Paleo Festival |
| July 19, 2018 | Benicàssim | Spain | Festival Internacional de Benicàssim |
| July 20, 2018 | Cuxhaven | Germany | Deichbrand Festival |
| July 21, 2018 | Paris | France | Hippodrome de Longchamp ^{[C]} |
| July 24, 2018 | Helsinki | Finland | Hartwall Arena |
| July 26, 2018 | Esch-Sur-Alzette | Luxembourg | Rockhal |
North America
| July 29, 2018 (Note: This concert is a part of Panorama Music Festival.) | New York City | United States | Randall's Island |
| September 4, 2018 | Milwaukee | United States | Fiserv Forum |
| September 9, 2018 (Note: This concert is a part of Skookum Festival.) | Vancouver | Canada | Stanley Park |
Asia
| September 12, 2018 | Tokyo | Japan | Nippon Budokan |
| September 13, 2018 | Osaka | Japan | Zepp Osaka Bayside |
| September 15, 2018 | Singapore | | Marina Bay Street Circuit ^{[D]} |
| September 17, 2018 | Pak Kret | Thailand | SCG Stadium |
| September 19, 2018 | Hong Kong | Hong Kong | AsiaWorld–Arena |

Festivals and other miscellaneous performances

^{A} This concert is the only one with Dave Keuning and Mark Stoermer, to say nothing of some warm-up dates
^{B} This concert is a part of Lollapalooza Argentina
^{C} This concert is a part of Lollapalooza France
^{D} This concert is a part of the Formula 1 2018 Singapore Grand Prix.

=== Box office score data ===
| Venue | City | Tickets sold / available | Gross revenue | Ref. |
|---|---|---|---|---|
| Terminal 5 | New York City | 2,802 / 2,802 (100%) | $210,255 | |
| Manchester Arena | Manchester | 30,100 / 31,232 (96%) | $2,282,540 | |
| SSE Hydro | Glasgow | 12,567 / 12,625 (99%) | $925,451 | |
| The O_{2} Arena | London | 35,629 / 36,748 (97%) | $3,021,730 | |
| Air Canada Centre | Toronto | 14,096 / 14,096 (100%) | $780,552 | |
| Place Bell | Laval | 7,776 / 7,776 (100%) | $427,199 | |
| TD Garden | Boston | 12,695 / 13,185 (96%) | $729,879 | |
| Barclays Center | Brooklyn | 13,718 / 16,933 (81%) | $831,384 | |
| The Anthem | Washington, D.C. | 6,000 / 6,000 (100%) | $465,350 | |
| Madison Square Garden | New York City | 13,518 / 13,518 (100%) | $847,440 | |
| Wells Fargo Center | Philadelphia | 14,466 / 14,789 (98%) | $839,085 | |
| United Center | Chicago | 14,027 / 14,027 (100%) | $814,493 | |
| Xcel Energy Center | Saint Paul | 10,251 / 11,496 (89%) | $513,190 | |
| Chaifetz Arena | St. Louis | 7,629 / 7,847 (97%) | $398,818 | |
| Infinite Energy Arena | Duluth | 10,060 / 10,383 (97%) | $558,360 | |
| Smart Financial Centre | Sugar Land | 6,114 / 6,402 (95%) | $352,927 | |
| The Pavilion | Irving | 4,218 / 4,345 (97%) | $306,473 | |
| Valley View Casino Center | San Diego | 10,179 / 10,543 (96%) | $561,990 | |
| Staples Center | Los Angeles | 26,428 / 26,428 (100%) | $1,716,139 | |
| MGM Grand Garden Arena | Las Vegas | 12,791 / 12,791 (100%) | $904,742 | |
| Vivint Smart Home Arena | Salt Lake City | 11,449 / 12,062 (95%) | $553,965 | |
| Mercedes-Benz Arena | Berlin | 11,386 / 11,581 (98%) | $569,396 | |
| Anfiteatro Coca-Cola | Guácima | 9,849 / 10,287 (96%) | $876,499 | |
| Spark Arena | Auckland | 9,584 / 9,584 (100%) | $604,183 | |
| TSB Bank Arena | Wellington | 5,269 / 5,271 (99%) | $316,954 | |
| Horncastle Arena | Christchurch | 7,508 / 7,508 (100%) | $420,526 | |
| Brisbane Entertainment Centre | Brisbane | 11,239 / 11,239 (100%) | $942,082 | |
| Qudos Bank Arena | Sydney | 14,738 / 15,097 (98%) | $1,234,150 | |
| Perth Arena | Perth | 14,140 / 14,140 (100%) | $1,161,670 | |
| Hisense Arena | Melbourne | 31,738 / 31,738 (100%) | $2,459,460 | |
| Adelaide Entertainment Centre | Adelaide | 8,282 / 8,282 (100%) | $666,223 | |
