= Be Still (The Killers song) =

Song by the Killers

from the album Battle Born
- Released: September 17, 2012
- Recorded: 2012
- Studio: Battle Born (Las Vegas, Nevada); Blackbird (Nashville, Tennessee)
- Genre: Rock ballad
- Length: 4:33
- Label: Island
- Songwriters: Brandon Flowers; Daniel Lanois
- Producer: Damian Taylor

"Be Still" is a song by American rock band the Killers. It is the eleventh track from the band's fourth studio album, Battle Born (2012). The song was written by Brandon Flowers and Daniel Lanois, and produced by Damian Taylor. "Be Still" was included on both the deluxe edition the band's first greatest hits album, Direct Hits (2013), as well as their second greatest hits album, Rebel Diamonds (2023).

== Background ==
"Be Still" is written in the key of D♯. In an interview with Spotify, frontman Brandon Flowers explained how "Be Still" came to be, saying: "We wanted to write ballads. I love our shows, but Killers gigs are like an assault for an hour and a half every night and it would be nice to go on more of a journey. We wrote the lyrics with Lanois at his crazy Gothic mansion in Silverlake." Flowers also has described "Be Still" as "sort of not a well-known song. But for real fans, it's a real favorite."

"Be Still" was written by Flowers and Daniel Lanois, who wrote other songs on Battle Born, including "The Way It Was" and "Heart of a Girl", known for also producing most of Flowers' debut solo studio album, Flamingo (2010). The song was produced by Damian Taylor, a Grammy-nominated producer who co-produced four other songs on Battle Born.

== Release and reception ==
"Be Still" was released on September 17, 2012, alongside the rest of Battle Born. The song received positive reviews upon release. The Fordham Ram described the song as "a moment of pure musical encouragement. It is a place to rest your head when everything else is rushing, and the song reflects this musically through its simplicity," noting that "logically, this seems to build to a rather boring song that deserves no recognition. The Killers somehow pull it off expertly, creating a feeling of comfort that causes you to stop for a moment and take a deep breath." Paste Magazine praised the song for how it "ascends from funereal silence to the some of the loveliest harmonies and chord changes of the year on a marching power ballad," while PopMatters proclaimed that "Be Still [...] is the sound of a Killers ballad being done right, never going into full-bore overdrive."

"Be Still" was later released as the final track from the deluxe edition of Direct Hits (2013). Of the choice to put "Be Still" on Direct Hits instead of excluded singles "Bones", "The World We Live In" and "Here With Me", Flowers said that "in this climate that we’re in [...] people pick and choose songs, and I think in the confusion of that process, they sometimes don't know about certain songs. This is one that we’re very proud of and that we love, so we felt it would have more of a chance if we put it on the record." "Be Still" was also later included on the release of Rebel Diamonds in 2023.

== Live performances ==
"Be Still" has been performed live 43 times as of November 2025. The song had its live debut at the Scottish Exhibition and Conference Centre in Glasgow on October 26, 2012, and was sporadically played during the Battle Born World Tour and the Wonderful Wonderful World Tour, and frequently played during the Rebel Diamonds Tour. "Be Still" is frequently played after "A Dustland Fairytale", but before "Runaways".

== Credits and personnel ==
Credits adapted from the liner notes of the deluxe edition of Battle Born.

=== Studios ===
- Battle Born Studios (Las Vegas, Nevada) – recording, mixing
- Golden Ratio (Montreal) – mixing
- The Lodge (New York City) – mastering

=== The Killers ===
- Brandon Flowers
- Dave Keuning
- Mark Stoermer
- Ronnie Vannucci Jr.

=== Technical ===
- Damian Taylor – production, mixing
- Robert Root – recording
- Emily Lazar – mastering
- Joe LaPorta – mastering
