= Direct Hits (The Killers album) =

Greatest hits album by the Killers
- Released: November 11, 2013
- Recorded: 2001–2013
- Studios: The Hearse (Berkeley, California); Cornerstone (Los Angeles, California); Studio at the Palms (Las Vegas, Nevada); Criterion (London); Battle Born (Las Vegas, Nevada); Blackbird (Nashville, Tennessee)
- Length: 61:13
- Label: Island
- Producers: Flood; Anthony Gonzalez; The Killers; Steve Lillywhite; Alan Moulder; Brendan O'Brien; Stuart Price; Jeff Saltzman

The Killers chronology
Battle Born (2012)	Direct Hits (2013)	Don't Waste Your Wishes (2016)

Singles from Direct Hits
- 1. "Shot at the Night" Released: September 17, 2013; 2. "Just Another Girl" Released: November 25, 2013

Direct Hits is a greatest hits album by American rock band the Killers. It was released on November 11, 2013, by Island Records. The album includes tracks from the band's first four studio albums and features two new tracks—"Shot at the Night" and "Just Another Girl", produced by Anthony Gonzalez of M83 and Stuart Price, respectively.

Regarding the album's release, vocalist Brandon Flowers noted, "This record feels like a great way to clean everything up and move onto the next thing."

== Background and recording ==
In 2013, during the band's Battle Born World Tour, the Killers began recording new material for a possible single release or new studio album. In June 2013, drummer Ronnie Vannucci Jr. noted, "[We're] not just [recording] demos. Real recordings. I mean, you never know what it's gonna be, I guess. But we have our engineer, and we're working with a couple of surprise guests, in the producer capacity. Some of it is sounding really cool. We can be guilty of making things so ornate, and sometimes that's a bad thing. So I always have conversations with Brandon [Flowers] about working from a smaller palette, simplifying things. If these new tracks develop a theme, a common thread, then that could be the start of something." Guitarist Dave Keuning elaborated, "I'm not saying a new album is going to come out or anything like that. But sometimes people just put out songs or it gets used for some kind of compilation. We'd like to get a new song out there soon."

The track "Shot at the Night" was produced by Anthony Gonzalez of French band M83, who had previously supported the Killers on their Day & Age World Tour. The band's label, Island Records, subsequently suggested Gonzalez as a possible producer for the band, following the success of M83's sixth studio album, Hurry Up, We're Dreaming (2011). Guitarist Dave Keuning noted, "There was a mutual thing like, 'Yeah we think he's good. We'll try him out.' It's something we finally agreed with our label on." Regarding the band's collaboration with Gonzalez, Flowers stated, "He's one of these new school producers. He's a technical wizard, but you can't discount his musicality. A lot of people do, because of the involvement of computers, but he's a real musician, too. He and Stuart Price may be known for working on the digital side of things, but they're also two of the most musical guys I've ever met."

Stuart Price, who had previously worked with the band on both their third studio album, Day & Age (2008), and on the Battle Born (2012) track, "Miss Atomic Bomb", produced the second of the two new songs, "Just Another Girl". Flowers noted, "[Stuart Price has] become like my brother now: we work well together, and I'm always impressed with his musicality and his taste. It's in a different vein from 'Shot At The Night', it's more of a narrative. You're 'in' the song in a different way."

Some critics have suggested the band released the album in order to fulfill a contractual obligation.

== Title ==
According to vocalist Brandon Flowers, Direct Hits was originally entitled Cream. He notes, "The initial idea, which maybe was better, was Cream. It was my idea. It was a play on the fact that we put out a B-sides compilation called Sawdust. And so it made sense to call the ones that were our best Cream." Flowers' original idea for the album sleeve featured the Hoover Dam and a reservoir of cream.

== Release ==
Direct Hits was announced on September 16, 2013—the 10th anniversary of the band's first UK show, which took place at London's Dublin Castle. Regarding this, Flowers noted, "We were so excited about being on English soil for the first time that night. I remember falling on my ass during 'Jenny Was a Friend of Mine', but NME gave the show a positive review, and that really helped to launch us."

When their label first raised the idea of a greatest hits album, Flowers says the band was surprised: "I'm a little young to already be putting out a greatest-hits album. This is premature, but the label was going to do it anyway ... so we decided to get involved with the artwork and contribute a couple of songs." Drummer Ronnie Vannucci Jr. agreed: "We'd wait another 10 years if it was up to us, but it's a contractual thing. We can fill a CD so it makes good business sense at this time of year. However, it's not like we're so pleased with ourselves we want to put it out. It feels like a douchie move."

Flowers is proud of the release: "It's a celebration of this decade for us. Some people maybe wouldn't do so much for a 'Best of', but I was introduced to a lot of music from bands' 'Best ofs', from Elton John to The Cars to Otis Redding, Johnny Cash... So I want to promote it! I'm happy to have one."

In the week after the album's release, four of the Killers' songs either entered or re-entered the UK Singles Chart, including "Shot at the Night" (number 23), "Just Another Girl" (number 83), "When You Were Young" (number 87), and "Mr. Brightside" (number 88).

=== Omissions ===
Direct Hits does not include the singles "Bones", "The World We Live In" or "Here With Me", nor does it include b-side compilation promotional singles, "Tranquilize", "Shadowplay" or the popular and critically acclaimed non-single from the band's debut album, Hot Fuss, "Jenny Was a Friend of Mine". Battle Born album track, "The Way It Was", however, is included on the track listing, and was not released as a single. Regarding its inclusion, Flowers noted, "With 20/20 hindsight, this song probably should've been a single. That'll probably be what's written on its headstone! When we play it live and Dave's riff starts, it's magic. We all love that song, so that's why it's on here."

A further Battle Born album track, "Be Still", is included as the closing track on the deluxe edition. Flowers states: "In this climate that we're in, or whatever you want to call it, people pick and choose songs, and I think in the confusion of that process, they sometimes don't know about certain songs. This is one that we're very proud of and that we love, so we felt it would have more of a chance if we put it on the record."

== Critical reception ==
Professional ratings
Aggregate scores
Source	Rating
Metacritic	71/100
Review scores
Source	Rating
AllMusic	4/5 stars
Clash	7/10
Pitchfork	6.4/10
Q	4/5 stars

In a positive review, AllMusic's Stephen Thomas Erlewine wrote: "The main benefit of Direct Hits, especially for those listeners who have always doubted the skills of The Killers, is how the operatic ambitions of Sam's Town feel not so extravagant when bookended by selections from Day & Age and Battle Born. All three of the albums – which are represented by three cuts a piece – sound strong here but what really has lasted are those singles from 2004's Hot Fuss [...] which now seem to capture a particular moment in time and yet also transcend it." Writing for Clash, Robin Murray gave the album a positive review, but noted that it was too soon for a career-spanning release: "Charting the long rise of a true pop phenomenon, Direct Hits is almost dragged under by the weight of the band’s success – each song simply feels too fresh, too well known to warrant the archival. A nice refresher, if a little unnecessary."

== Track listing ==
No.	Title	Writer(s)	Producer(s)	Length
1.	"Mr. Brightside" (from Hot Fuss, 2004)	Brandon Flowers; Dave Keuning	Jeff Saltzman; the Killers	3:44
2.	"Somebody Told Me" (from Hot Fuss)	Flowers; Keuning; Mark Stoermer; Ronnie Vannucci Jr.	Saltzman; the Killers	3:18
3.	"Smile Like You Mean It" (from Hot Fuss)	Flowers; Stoermer	Saltzman; the Killers	3:57
4.	"All These Things That I've Done" (from Hot Fuss)	Flowers	Saltzman; the Killers	5:03
5.	"When You Were Young" (from Sam's Town, 2006)	Flowers; Keuning; Stoermer; Vannucci	Flood; Alan Moulder; the Killers	3:40
6.	"Read My Mind" (from Sam's Town)	Flowers; Keuning; Stoermer	Flood; Moulder; the Killers	4:07
7.	"For Reasons Unknown" (from Sam's Town)	Flowers	Flood; Moulder; the Killers	3:33
8.	"Human" (from Day & Age, 2008)	Flowers; Keuning; Stoermer; Vannucci	Stuart Price; the Killers	4:05
9.	"Spaceman" (from Day & Age)	Flowers; Keuning; Stoermer; Vannucci	Price; the Killers	4:45
10.	"A Dustland Fairytale" (from Day & Age)	Flowers; Keuning; Stoermer; Vannucci	Price; the Killers	3:45
11.	"Runaways" (from Battle Born, 2012)	Flowers	Brendan O'Brien; Steve Lillywhite^{[a]}; Damian Taylor^{[a]}	4:05
12.	"Miss Atomic Bomb" (from Battle Born)	Flowers; Vannucci	Price	4:55
13.	"The Way It Was" (from Battle Born)	Flowers; Keuning; Stoermer; Vannucci; Daniel Lanois	O'Brien	3:52
14.	"Shot at the Night" (previously unreleased)	Flowers	Anthony Gonzalez	4:03
15.	"Just Another Girl" (previously unreleased)	Flowers	Price	4:21
Total length:				61:13

Deluxe edition bonus tracks
No.	Title	Writer(s)	Producer(s)	Length
16.	"Mr. Brightside" (original demo)	Flowers; Keuning		4:22
17.	"When You Were Young" (Calvin Harris remix)	Flowers; Keuning; Stoermer; Vannucci	Flood; Moulder; the Killers; Harris^{[b]}	6:12
18.	"Be Still" (from Battle Born)	Flowers; Lanois	Taylor	4:33
Total length:				76:20

=== Notes ===
- ^{^[a]} signifies an additional producer
- ^{^[b]} signifies a remixer

== Personnel ==
Credits adapted from the liner notes of the deluxe edition of Direct Hits.

=== The Killers ===
- Brandon Flowers
- Dave Keuning
- Mark Stoermer
- Ronnie Vannucci Jr.

=== Additional musicians ===
- Stuart Price – additional keyboards, programming (track 11)
- Matt Norcross – drums (track 16)

=== Technical ===
- Jeff Saltzman – production, recording (tracks 1–4)
- The Killers – production (tracks 1–10)
- Mark Needham – mixing (tracks 1, 3)
- Alan Moulder – mixing (tracks 2, 4–7, 11, 17); production, recording (tracks 5–7, 17)
- Flood – production, recording, mixing (tracks 5–7, 17)
- Mark Gray – additional engineering (tracks 5–7)
- Neeraj Khajanchi – additional engineering (tracks 5–7)
- Max Dingel – additional engineering (tracks 5–7)
- Andy Savours – mix engineering (tracks 5–7)
- Stuart Price – production, mixing (tracks 8–10, 12, 15)
- Robert Root – engineering (tracks 8–10); recording (tracks 11, 12, 14, 15, 18); mixing (tracks 13, 14)
- Dave Emery – mixing assistance (tracks 8–10)
- Alex Dromgoole – mixing assistance (tracks 8–10)
- Ted Sablay – additional engineering (track 9)
- Brendan O'Brien – production, recording (tracks 11, 13)
- Steve Lillywhite – additional production (track 11)
- Damian Taylor – additional production (track 11); production (track 18)
- Catherine Marks – mix engineering (track 11)
- John Catlin – mix engineering (track 11)
- Felix Rashman – mix assistance (track 11)
- Anthony Gonzalez – production (track 14)
- Mike Sak – engineering (track 16)
- Calvin Harris – remix (track 17)
- Simon Davey – mastering (track 17)

=== Artwork ===
- Warren Fu – art direction
- Andy West – design, layout
- Colin Lane – photography
- Williams + Hirakawa – photography
- Torey Mundkowsky – photography
- Wyatt Boswell – photography
- Kristen Tiengst – art and photography production
- Tai Linzie – art and photography production
- Andy Proctor – package production

=== Studios ===
Recording locations

- The Hearse (Berkeley, California) – recording (tracks 1–4)
- Cornerstone Recording Studios (Los Angeles, California) – recording (tracks 1–4)
- Studio at the Palms (Las Vegas, Nevada) – recording (tracks 5–7)
- Criterion Studios (London) – additional recording, additional engineering (tracks 5–7)
- Battle Born Studios (Las Vegas, Nevada) – engineering (tracks 8–10); recording (tracks 11–15, 18)
- Blackbird Studios (Nashville, Tennessee) – recording (tracks 11, 13)
- killthemessenger Studio (Las Vegas, Nevada) – engineering (track 16)

Mixing and mastering locations

- Cornerstone Recording Studios (Los Angeles, California) – mixing (tracks 1, 3)
- Eden Studios (London) – mixing (tracks 2, 4)
- The Town House (London) – mixing (tracks 2, 4)
- Assault & Battery (London) – mixing (tracks 5–7, 11)
- Olympic Studios (London) – mixing (tracks 8–10)
- Battle Born Studios (Las Vegas, Nevada) – mixing (tracks 12–14, 18)
- The Exchange Mastering (London) – mastering (track 17)
- Golden Ratio (Montreal) – mixing (track 18)
- The Lodge (New York City) – mastering

== Charts ==
=== Weekly charts ===
Chart (2013–2019)	Peak position
Australian Albums (ARIA)	10
Austrian Albums (Ö3 Austria)	73
Belgian Albums (Ultratop Flanders)	18
Belgian Albums (Ultratop Wallonia)	42
Canadian Albums (Billboard)	25
Croatian Albums (HDU)	43
Dutch Albums (Album Top 100)	40
French Albums (SNEP)	166
German Albums (Offizielle Top 100)	63
Irish Albums (IRMA)	5
Italian Albums (FIMI)	50
Japanese Albums (Oricon)	75
Mexican Albums (Top 100 Mexico)	9
Norwegian Albums (VG-lista)	39
Scottish Albums (Official Charts)	4
South Korean Albums (Gaon)	35
Spanish Albums (Promusicae)	34
Swiss Albums (Schweizer Hitparade)	57
UK Albums (Official Charts)	5
US Billboard 200	20
US Top Alternative Albums (Billboard)	4
US Top Rock Albums (Billboard)	5

=== Year-end charts ===
Chart (2013)	Position
Mexican Albums (Top 100 Mexico)	87
UK Albums (OCC)	49

Chart (2018)	Position
Australian Albums (ARIA)	80
UK Albums (OCC)	83

Chart (2019)	Position
Australian Albums (ARIA)	85
UK Albums (OCC)	47

Chart (2020)	Position
UK Albums (OCC)	63

Chart (2021)	Position
UK Albums (OCC)	84

Chart (2022)	Position
UK Albums (OCC)	61

Chart (2023)	Position
UK Albums (OCC)	75

=== Decade-end charts ===
Chart (2010–2019)	Position
UK Albums (OCC)	99

== Certifications ==
Region	Certification	Certified units/sales
Australia (ARIA)	Gold	35,000^{‡}
United Kingdom (BPI)	3× Platinum	752,500
^{‡} Sales+streaming figures based on certification alone.
