= Wonderful Wonderful (The Killers album) =

2017 studio album by the Killers

Studio album by the Killers
- Released: September 22, 2017
- Recorded: September 2016 – May 2017
- Studios: 11th Street Records (Las Vegas, Nevada) (Note: Tracks 1–10, 12 and 13); The Garage (Topanga, California); Battle Born (Las Vegas, Nevada) (Note: All tracks); The Phantasy Sound (London) (Note: Tracks 2, 12 and 13)
- Genres: Indie pop; heartland rock; new wave
- Length: 43:00
- Label: Island
- Producers: Erol Alkan; the Killers; Jacknife Lee; Stuart Price

The Killers chronology
Don't Waste Your Wishes (2016)	Wonderful Wonderful (2017)	Imploding the Mirage (2020)

Singles from Wonderful Wonderful
- 1. "The Man" Released: June 14, 2017; 2. "Run for Cover" Released: November 14, 2017; 3. "Rut" Released: December 9, 2017

Wonderful Wonderful is the fifth studio album by American rock band the Killers, released on September 22, 2017, by Island Records. It was their first studio album in five years, since Battle Born (2012), and their fifth consecutive studio album to top the UK Albums Chart. It is also their first album to top the Billboard 200, moving 118,000 album-equivalent units in its first week. Wonderful Wonderful is the Killers' most recent album to feature the band's core line-up, with lead guitarist Dave Keuning and bassist Mark Stoermer being absent on Imploding the Mirage (2020) and Pressure Machine (2021), respectively.

== Background ==
Brandon Flowers revealed in May 2015 that he and Dave Keuning were exchanging ideas for the Killers' fifth studio album. The four members reconvened in October 2015, a few months earlier than originally planned. The band began working on the album at their own Battle Born Studios and also rented houses in Joshua Tree National Park and San Diego. They briefly recorded with Ryan Tedder and other producers in Los Angeles before beginning to work with Jacknife Lee, who had been recommended to them by U2 frontman Bono. Lee worked with the band between September 2016 and May 2017 at his home studio in Topanga, California, and at National SouthWestern Recording studios in Las Vegas, Nevada. Lee produced all tracks on the album alongside the Killers, with additional production by Erol Alkan on "The Man" and Stuart Price on "Out of My Mind".

In May 2016, it was announced that bassist Mark Stoermer would take an extended break from touring with the band. However, he continued work on the album, forging many of the tracks alongside Flowers. "He stopped touring with us and it ended up being a blessing for the band. He was much more eager to go to the studio, he felt like he had a monkey off his back, he really contributed a lot to this record." Keuning also announced a hiatus from touring in August 2017, shortly after the album's recording, although he would remain with the band.

After celebrating the 10th anniversary of their second album Sam's Town by holding a few concerts, Flowers realized they wanted to make an actual record and not just "slap a bunch of songs together". He stated Wonderful Wonderful is the closest thing they have done to their 2006 album, Sam's Town. According to him, the idea for the title of the album came when he was in the desert and saw a storm coming: "I thought 'wonderful, wonderful' and I was able to use it in a song that I wrote with Mark, our bass player, and it ended being an important part of the record."

The Killers enlisted Dire Straits vocalist and lead guitarist Mark Knopfler for a guitar part on "Have All the Songs Been Written?". Australian musician Alex Cameron contributed lyrics to some tracks, including "Run for Cover", which was originally written for the band's third studio album, Day & Age (2008).

== Music and lyrics ==
Lyrically, the album is about what it means to be a man, as Flowers revealed on an interview with Entertainment Weekly: "In your head it's about being tough and bringing home the bacon, but what I've come to find is it's really more about empathy and compassion." He explained how the song "Tyson vs Douglas" was inspired by the 1990 boxing match between Mike Tyson and Buster Douglas, where he explores what it is like to watch a hero fall, like how Mike Tyson who previously was undefeated, lost to Buster Douglas. For NME magazine, Flowers shared that the lyrics of the album are "the most personal and bare" that he has ever been: "I'm looking in the mirror on this record and focusing a lot on my own personal experiences. Instead of just drawing upon all these experiences and maybe using them in other songs, I am going straight for it with this and singing about my life and my family and that's something different for me."

The track "Rut" was inspired by the struggle of Flowers' wife Tana with posttraumatic stress disorder (PTSD). He said: "Usually I feel protective of her but I decided to take it head on. So 'Rut' is about her submitting to it. That doesn't mean that she's gonna let it beat her, but rather that she's gonna finally acknowledge that it's there and promise to break this cycle." Flowers also added that putting his wife's battle into a song helped him understand better what she is going through. "Have All the Songs Been Written?" was originally the subject line of an email Flowers sent to Bono, in the midst of a bout of writer's block, before the latter suggested it would make an excellent song title.

"The Man" is a track about Brandon Flowers' attitude and ego when he reached stardom after the release of the band's first record, Hot Fuss, and draws inspiration from the disco music of Kool & the Gang's "Spirit of the Boogie"; for this track, Ronnie Vannucci Jr. based his drums on "Peek-a-Boo" by Siouxsie and the Banshees.

== Promotion ==
=== Singles ===
Starting on May 6, 2017, the band tweeted a series of photographs and short videos to tease the album's lead single. Among the tweets was a photograph of Brandon Flowers wearing a silver jacket with gold lettering spelling out "The Man", which turned out to be the title of the song. On June 14, 2017, it was finally released as the first single from the album. BBC Radio 1's Annie Mac debuted the track as "Annie Mac's Hottest Record in the World". The music video for "The Man" was released on June 28, 2017, and features a cameo by former Mayor of Las Vegas and current First Gentleman of Las Vegas Oscar Goodman. "The Man" topped the Billboard Adult Alternative Songs chart and reached number two on the Alternative Songs chart.

On July 28, the band released the song "Run for Cover" as the album's first promotional single, which was made available as an instant download for pre-orders of the album. On August 22, a music video for the song was premiered. The song was later sent to alternative radio in the United States on November 14, 2017, serving as the album's second single.

The Killers performed both "The Man" and "Run for Cover" on Jimmy Kimmel Live! on July 31, 2017. The band also performed "The Man" on The Late Show with Stephen Colbert on September 21, at the 2017 MTV Europe Music Awards on November 12, and on BBC One's Sounds Like Friday Night on November 24. On September 30, 2017, the band performed several tracks from the album at the 2017 AFL Grand Final.

The album's third single, "Rut", was serviced to UK hot adult contemporary radio on December 9, 2017. On January 9, 2018, a music video for the single was released, directed by Danny Drysdale.

=== Promotional singles ===
The title track and first promotional single "Wonderful Wonderful" was premiered on Beats 1 as Zane Lowe's World Record on August 24. Nearly a year later on August 23, 2018, a music video was released for the title track. "Some Kind of Love" was released on September 15 as the second promotional single from the album, which was influenced by English musician Brian Eno.

=== Other songs ===
On the Wonderful Wonderful World Tour in 2017 and 2018, other songs such as "The Calling", "Tyson vs Douglas", and "Life to Come" were played during multiple shows. Additionally, "Tyson vs Douglas" charted at No. 39 on the Ultratip Bubbling Under 100 and No. 42 on the Ultratip Bubbling Under 50. The track "The Calling" featured a reading of a Bible verse from actor Woody Harrelson.

== Critical reception ==
Professional ratings
Aggregate scores
Source	Rating
Metacritic	71/100
Review scores
Source	Rating
AllMusic	4/5 stars
Entertainment Weekly	B
The Guardian	4/5 stars
The Independent	3/5 stars
NME	4/5 stars
Pitchfork	6.3/10
Q	4/5 stars
Rolling Stone	3.5/5 stars
Slant Magazine	3.5/5 stars
The Times	3/5 stars

Wonderful Wonderful received generally positive reviews from music critics. At Metacritic, which assigns a normalized rating out of 100 to reviews from mainstream publications, the album received an average score of 71, based on 25 reviews.

AllMusic editor Stephen Thomas Erlewine wrote, "By this point, Flowers' obsessions and signatures are so idiosyncratic, he's clearly the auteur behind Wonderful Wonderful just as he was with The Desired Effect, and the record charms because its ridiculousness is sincere and his sincerity is ridiculous – two qualities that make him and his art messy and quite genuine." Writing a four-star review for NME, Barry Nicolson said, "As a songwriter, Flowers has never been particularly guarded about himself – he's neurotic, driven, sentimental and sometimes corny – but he bares more on 'Wonderful Wonderful' than ever before, and the result is the band's best album since 2006's 'Sam's Town'. It might get lonely at the top, but the Killers aren't going anywhere just yet." A four-star review by The Guardian claims Wonderful Wonderful consists of the band's "best songs in a decade [...] This is certainly big music, which is all the better for its more intimate, touching soul." Rolling Stone gave the album the same 3.5 star rating it gave Hot Fuss (2004) and Day & Age (2008).

In a positive review, Niall Doherty of Q magazine described it as a "glossy indie-pop album with sonics as slick and glistening as a brand-new Vegas skyscraper". In an enthusiastic review, Beat Magazine said: "Rather than releasing an album for the sake of putting out music, Wonderful Wonderful oozes intention, there are no filler songs, boring melodies or lazy lyrics – every detail of the record has been taken into consideration." However, Pranav Trewn from Stereogum said the album "marks their most emphatic embodiment of purposelessness". Will Hodgkinson's review for The Times was also critical of the album, claiming "Wonderful Wonderful has a sonic scale and production polish matched only by Bono and his world-saving stadium inhabitants, but it also displays U2's weakness for allowing grandiosity to smother intimacy of expression, alongside a desire to be all things to all people." However, when Pitchfork critic Jason Green reviewed Wonderful Wonderful, he ultimately gave it the highest rating that any Killers studio albums had received to date from the publication and concluded, "With the Killers, greatness and ridiculousness go hand in hand."

=== Accolades ===
Publication	Accolade	Rank	Ref.
American Songwriter	Top 25 Albums of 2017	20	
Dork	Dork's favourite fifty albums of 2017	46	
Radio X	Top 30 Best New Albums of 2017	—N/a	

Entertainment Weekly named "Have All the Songs Been Written" as the 28th best song of 2017.

== Commercial performance ==
Wonderful Wonderful debuted at number one on the US Billboard 200, becoming their first record to top the chart. It moved 118,000 album-equivalent units, with 111,000 being pure album sales. Selling 51,756 copies (including 2,711 from sales-equivalent streams) in the United Kingdom in its first week, the Killers became the first international act to chart its first five studio albums at number one. The first-week UK sales (and equivalent) figure exceeded the combined sales (and equivalent) of the rest of the top-five albums. As of August 2020, the album had sold 182,853 copies in the UK. Wonderful Wonderful also debuted atop the Australian albums chart. In Canada, the album was the top-selling album of its debut week, but streaming factoring relegated it to a top-five charting.

== Track listing ==
All tracks are produced by Jacknife Lee, except where noted.

No.	Title	Writer(s)	Producer(s)	Length
1.	"Wonderful Wonderful"	Brandon Flowers; Mark Stoermer; Ronnie Vannucci Jr.; Lee		5:10
2.	"The Man"	Flowers; Stoermer; Vannucci; Lee; Robert Bell; Ronald Bell; Don Boyce; George Brown; Robert Mickens; Otha Nash; Claydes Smith; Dennis Thomas; Richard Westfield	Lee; Erol Alkan^{[a]}; Jimmy Robertson^{[b]}	4:10
3.	"Rut"	Flowers; Dave Keuning; Stoermer; Vannucci; Lee		4:24
4.	"Life to Come"	Flowers; Stoermer; Vannucci; Alex Cameron; Lee; Ryan Tedder		4:31
5.	"Run for Cover"	Flowers; Stoermer; Vannucci; Cameron; Lee; Bob Marley; Stuart Price		3:42
6.	"Tyson vs Douglas"	Flowers; Stoermer; Vannucci; Cameron		4:33
7.	"Some Kind of Love"	Flowers; Brian Eno; Lee		4:38
8.	"Out of My Mind"	Flowers; Stoermer; Vannucci; Cameron; Price	Lee; Price^{[a]}	3:43
9.	"The Calling"	Flowers; Stoermer; Vannucci; Cameron		4:01
10.	"Have All the Songs Been Written?"	Flowers; Stoermer; Lee		4:08
Total length:				43:00

Deluxe and Japanese edition bonus tracks
No.	Title	Writer(s)	Producer(s)	Length
11.	"Money on Straight"	Flowers; Keuning	The Killers	3:34
12.	"The Man" (Jacques Lu Cont remix)	Flowers; Stoermer; Vannucci; Lee; Robert Bell; Ronald Bell; Boyce; Brown; Mickens; Nash; Smith; Thomas; Westfield	Lee; Alkan^{[a]}; Jacques Lu Cont^{[c]}	4:15
13.	"The Man" (Duke Dumont remix)	Flowers; Stoermer; Vannucci; Lee; Robert Bell; Ronald Bell; Boyce; Brown; Mickens; Nash; Smith; Thomas; Westfield	Lee; Alkan^{[a]}; Duke Dumont^{[c]}	3:53
Total length:				54:43

Target exclusive edition bonus track
No.	Title	Writer(s)	Producer(s)	Length
11.	"The Man" (CRNKN remix)	Flowers; Stoermer; Vannucci; Lee; Robert Bell; Ronald Bell; Boyce; Brown; Mickens; Nash; Smith; Thomas; Westfield	Lee; Alkan^{[a]}; CRNKN^{[c]}

=== Notes ===
- ^{^[a]} signifies an additional producer
- ^{^[b]} signifies an assistant producer
- ^{^[c]} signifies a remixer

=== Sample credits ===
- "The Man" contains elements of "Spirit of the Boogie" (1975), as performed by Kool & the Gang.
- "Run for Cover" contains an interpolation of "Redemption Song" (1980), as performed by Bob Marley.
- "Tyson vs Douglas" contains a sample of the Mike Tyson vs. James Douglas HBO fight featuring commentary by Jim Lampley, Sugar Ray Leonard and Larry Merchant.

== Personnel ==
Credits adapted from the liner notes of the deluxe edition of Wonderful Wonderful.

=== The Killers ===
- Brandon Flowers – vocals, keys (all tracks)
- Dave Keuning – guitar (tracks 2–4, 6, 10, 12, 13)
- Mark Stoermer – bass (1, 2, 4–6, 8–13); fretless bass (tracks 3, 7); guitar (tracks 1, 4, 6, 8–13)
- Ronnie Vannucci Jr. – drums (all tracks)

=== Additional musicians ===
- Jacknife Lee – guitar, keys, programming (tracks 1–10, 12, 13)
- Erol Alkan – drum programming, percussion, synth (tracks 2, 12, 13)
- Becca Marie – additional vocals (tracks 2, 3, 8, 9, 12, 13)
- Las Vegas Mass Choir – additional vocals (tracks 2, 3, 8, 9, 12, 13)
- Nina Fechner – additional vocals (tracks 2, 3, 8, 9, 12, 13)
- Justin Diaz – additional vocals (tracks 2, 3, 8, 9, 12, 13)
- Dan Grech-Marguerat – additional programming (tracks 2, 12, 13)
- Roger Joseph Manning Jr. – keys (track 7)
- Stuart Price – keys, programming (track 8)
- Woody Harrelson – intro narration (track 9)
- Mark Knopfler – guitar (track 10)
- Davide Rossi – string arrangements, strings (track 10)

=== Technical ===
- Jacknife Lee – production, engineering, programming (tracks 1–10, 12, 13); mixing (tracks 7, 10)
- Matt Bishop – engineering (tracks 1–10, 12, 13)
- Robert Root – engineering (all tracks); mixing (track 11)
- Malcolm Harrison – engineering assistance (tracks 1–10, 12, 13)
- Rich Costey – mixing (tracks 1, 8)
- Martin Cooke – engineering assistance (tracks 1, 8)
- Nicolas Fournier – engineering assistance (tracks 1, 8)
- Erol Alkan – additional production (tracks 2, 12, 13)
- Jimmy Robertson – production assistance (tracks 2, 12, 3)
- Dan Grech-Marguerat – mixing (tracks 2, 12, 13)
- Joel Davies – mixing assistance (tracks 2, 12, 3)
- Charles Haydon Hicks – mixing assistance (track 2, 12, 13)
- Alan Moulder – mixing (tracks 3, 4, 6, 9)
- Caesar Edmunds – mix engineering (tracks 3, 4, 6, 9)
- Ariel Rechtshaid – mixing (track 5)
- Shawn Everett – mixing (track 5)
- Stuart Price – additional production (track 8); remix (track 12)
- Matt Breunig – engineering (track 9)
- The Killers – production (track 11)
- Duke Dumont – remix (track 13)
- John Davis – mastering (all tracks)
- Dave Kutch – mastering (track 2)

=== Artwork ===
- Joe Spix – art direction, design
- Brandon Flowers – art direction, design
- Anton Corbijn – photography
- Paul Lane – package production

== Charts ==
=== Weekly charts ===
Weekly chart performance for Wonderful Wonderful
Chart (2017)	Peak position
Australian Albums (ARIA)	1
Austrian Albums (Ö3 Austria)	10
Belgian Albums (Ultratop Flanders)	7
Belgian Albums (Ultratop Wallonia)	14
Canadian Albums (Billboard)	4
Croatian International Albums (HDU)	5
Czech Albums (ČNS IFPI)	50
Danish Vinyl Albums (Hitlisten)	38
Dutch Albums (Album Top 100)	12
Finnish Albums (Suomen virallinen lista)	16
French Albums (SNEP)	60
German Albums (Offizielle Top 100)	8
Greek Albums (IFPI)	10
Irish Albums (IRMA)	2
Italian Albums (FIMI)	26
Japanese Albums (Oricon)	127
Mexican Albums (Top 100 Mexico)	6
New Zealand Albums (RMNZ)	3
Norwegian Albums (VG-lista)	16
Polish Albums (ZPAV)	40
Portuguese Albums (AFP)	37
Scottish Albums (Official Charts)	1
South Korean International Albums (Gaon)	12
Spanish Albums (Promusicae)	6
Swedish Albums (Sverigetopplistan)	28
Swiss Albums (Schweizer Hitparade)	8
UK Albums (Official Charts)	1
US Billboard 200	1
US Top Alternative Albums (Billboard)	1
US Top Rock Albums (Billboard)	1

=== Year-end charts ===
Year-end chart performance for Wonderful Wonderful
Chart (2017)	Position
Australian Albums (ARIA)	69
Belgian Albums (Ultratop Flanders)	127
UK Albums (OCC)	45
US Top Rock Albums (Billboard)	34

== Certifications ==
Certifications for Wonderful Wonderful
Region	Certification	Certified units/sales
United Kingdom (BPI)	Gold	182,853

== See also ==
- List of number-one albums of 2017 (Australia)
- List of Billboard 200 number-one albums of 2017
- List of UK Albums Chart number ones of the 2010s
