= The Way It Was (The Killers song) =

2012 song by the Killers

Song by the Killers

from the album Battle Born
- Released: September 17, 2012
- Recorded: 2012
- Studio: Blackbird (Nashville, Tennessee)
- Genre: Rock ballad
- Length: 3:51
- Label: Island
- Songwriters: Brandon Flowers; Dave Keuning; Mark Stoermer; Ronnie Vannucci Jr.; Daniel Lanois
- Producer: Brendan O'Brien

"The Way It Was" is a song by American rock band the Killers. It is the third track of the band's fourth studio album, Battle Born (2012). It was written by Brandon Flowers, Dave Keuning, Mark Stoermer, Ronnie Vannucci Jr., and Daniel Lanois. Despite not being a single, "The Way It Was" is one of the Killers' most popular and well received songs, notably the heartfelt storytelling in the lyrics.

== Background ==
The song is written in the key of C# Minor and tells the story of a man driving through a desert after a breakup, before wondering if he continued with the relationship, if it could be "the way it was", before the man thinks about what could've happened to the girl. The song makes multiple direct references to Elvis Presley's 1956 song "Don't Be Cruel".

== Release and reception ==
"The Way It Was" was released on September 17, 2012, along with the rest of Battle Born. The song garnered generally positive reviews from critics. NME called The Way It Was a "blustering ballad", while Vivian W. Leung of The Harvard Crimson called it "an example of the generic, deflated instrumental development". Jon Dolan of Rolling Stone magazine called it a "doomed romantics' epic" that "packs Meat Loaf into a red Corvette and drives him out to 'the lonely Esmeralda County line'", a direct reference to the song's lyrics. Tosha R. Taylor of the Journal of Popular Romance Studies describes how the song "juxtaposes carefree images of young romance with a more mature man’s sense of loss".

The song was included on the band’s first greatest hits album, Direct Hits (2013), despite not being a single. Of the choice, frontman Brandon Flowers said "with 20/20 hindsight, this song probably should’ve been a single. That’ll probably be what’s written on its headstone! When we play it live and Dave’s riff starts, it’s magic. We all love that song, so that’s why it’s on here."

== Live performances ==
"The Way It Was" has been performed live over 350 times as of November 2025. The song was notably played during many shows on the Battle Born World Tour, and later on the Wonderful Wonderful World Tour. During these tours, “The Way It Was” was commonly played directly after “Spaceman” and “Somebody Told Me”.

== Credits and personnel ==
Credits adapted from the liner notes of the deluxe edition of Battle Born.

=== Personnel ===
==== The Killers ====
- Brandon Flowers
- Dave Keuning
- Mark Stoermer
- Ronnie Vannucci Jr.

==== Additional personnel ====
- Brendan O'Brien – production, recording
- Robert Root – mixing

=== Studios ===
- Blackbird Studios (Nashville, Tennessee) – recording
- Battle Born Studios (Las Vegas, Nevada) – mixing
- The Lodge (New York City) – mastering
