= Some Kind of Love (disambiguation) =

"Some Kind of Love" is a 2017 song by the Killers.

Some Kind of Love may also refer to:

- "Some Kind of Love", a song by John Stewart from his 1975 album Wingless Angels
- Some Kind of Love (film), a 2015 Canadian documentary directed by Thomas Burstyn
- "Some Kind of Love", a 2021 song by Azure Ryder
- "Some Kind of Love", a song by Dido from the 2019 album Still on My Mind
