= The Man (The Killers song) =

2017 single by the Killers

Single by the Killers

from the album Wonderful Wonderful
- Released: June 14, 2017
- Recorded: 11th Street Records (Las Vegas, Nevada); The Garage (Topanga, California); Battle Born (Las Vegas, Nevada); The Phantasy Sound (London)
- Genre: New wave; pop rock; dance-rock; glam rock
- Length: 4:10 (album version); 3:41 (radio/Rebel Diamonds version)
- Label: Island
- Songwriters: Brandon Flowers; Mark Stoermer; Ronnie Vannucci Jr.; Jacknife Lee; Robert Bell; Ronald Bell; Don Boyce; George Brown; Robert Mickens; Otha Nash; Claydes Smith; Dennis Thomas; Richard Westfield
- Producer: Jacknife Lee

The Killers singles chronology
"Peace of Mind" (2016)	"The Man" (2017)	"Run for Cover" (2017)

Music video
- "The Man" on YouTube

"The Man" is a song by American rock band the Killers from their fifth studio album, Wonderful Wonderful (2017). It was released on June 14, 2017, as the lead single from the album.

== Background and artwork ==
Drummer Ronnie Vannucci Jr. stated that the song's lyrics were "largely about how when we were younger we felt invincible. What it meant to be a 'man' in your 20's. Sort of your chest out, the breadwinner, nothing could stop you, invincible sort of thing. It's sort of tongue-and-cheeking that, how that is not really the point of being a man at all. It's actually more about compassion and empathy." According to the band's vocalist Brandon Flowers, the song is a response to the more delicate songs of the album, including "Rut" and "Some Kind of Love": "Those songs came and it was like, 'These are more tender or contemplative than we've ever been, how did we get to this point?' Reflecting on that was where 'The Man' came from."

The artwork for the single features Flowers's youngest son Henry and was shot by Anton Corbijn.

== Composition ==
"The Man" is a new wave, pop rock, disco-rock, and glam rock song written by the Killers and Jacknife Lee, the latter of whom also produced it.

The track contains elements of the 1975 Kool & the Gang song "Spirit of the Boogie".

Lyrically, the song is a self-reflection of Brandon Flowers' cockier early years and described by himself as a way of reconciling that wide-eyed character with the man he is now. Flowers intended for the album to capture where he was at the time, but realised towards the end of the album's sessions that he couldn't do this without acknowledging his younger self, which is captured in "The Man". The song was written by Flowers as a response to the album's more delicate, quieter songs.

== Release and promotion ==
Starting on May 6, 2017, the band tweeted a series of photographs and short videos to tease their then-untitled fifth studio album. Among the tweets was a photograph of Flowers wearing a silver jacket with gold lettering spelling out "The Man". On June 14, 2017, "The Man" was released as the lead single from Wonderful Wonderful. BBC Radio 1's Annie Mac debuted the track as "Annie Mac's Hottest Record in the World".

On July 31, 2017, the band performed "The Man" on Jimmy Kimmel Live!. On August 20, 2017, Showtime released a promotional video featuring the band performing "The Man" to promote Floyd Mayweather Jr. vs. Conor McGregor.

== Critical reception ==
The single received mostly positive reviews from music critics. Ryan Dombal from Pitchfork described "The Man" as an "over shiny, strutting funk descended from James Brown's '80s anthem 'Living in America'", saying Flowers brags about himself to the point of ridiculousness. He added: "The song is called "The Man", but its ideas of manliness are nothing but boyish. As American masculinity continues to evolve, and threatens to fall back on ugly old norms, The Killers try to have it both ways here, poking fun at dick-swinging supremacy while serving up something that could reasonably soundtrack a rough-and-dusted pickup truck commercial." Writing for DIY magazine, Will Richards praised Flowers' confidence on the song and called it "huge, bombastic and fearless". Robin Murray of Clash called the song "daft, delirious and completely addictive".

== Commercial performance ==
The song debuted on Billboard's Alternative Songs chart at number 26 the week after its release. On the same week, it ranked as Alternative Radio's most added song. The track subsequently became The Killers' ninth song to reach the top 10 of the Alternative Songs chart, before entering the top five. "The Man" subsequently reached number one on Billboard's Adult Alternative Songs chart, their first song to do so in over 10 years since "Read My Mind". The song also reached number one on Mediabase's alternative airplay chart.

== Music video ==
The accompanying music video for the single was directed by Tim Mattia and released on June 28, 2017. The video, filmed in Las Vegas, features Flowers portraying five characters—a gambler, a lounge singer, a playboy, a motocross racer, and a karaoke singer—that are connected by their obsession with ego and fame. By the end of the video, all of Flowers' characters begin to fall apart as their success fades: the gambler loses his car; the curtains close on the lounge singer; the girls all ditch the playboy; the old tapes show the rider's career-ending accident; and the karaoke singer gets beaten up for flirting with a customer's wife. It includes a cameo by former Mayor of Las Vegas and later First Gentleman of Las Vegas Oscar Goodman.

== Awards ==
Year	Ceremony	Award	Result
2017	Q Awards	Best Track	Nominated

== Accolades ==
Publication	Country	Accolade	Year	Rank
BBC Radio 1	United Kingdom	Annie Mac's Hottest Record of the Year 2017	2017	1
Billboard	United States	The 25 Best Rock Songs of 2017: Critics' Picks	2017	17
Billboard	United States	Billboard's 100 Best Songs of 2017: Critics' Picks	2017	99
DIY	United Kingdom	The DIY List 2017	2017	—N/a
NME	United Kingdom	Best Songs of the Year 2017	2017	9
NME	United Kingdom	Best Songs of the Decade: The 2010s	2019	93
Radio X	United Kingdom	The 30 Best Songs of the Year 2017	2017	—N/a
Triple J	Australia	Triple J Hottest 100 2017	2017	19

== Usage in media ==
The song was featured in a trailer for Vice, a 2018 biopic of former Vice President of the United States Dick Cheney.

The Jacques Lu Cont remix was featured in the 2018 video game Forza Horizon 4.

The song is featured in the 2018 video game EA Sports UFC 3.

The song plays at the end of DC's Stargirl season 1, episode 2 ("S.T.R.I.P.E.").

The song was featured in the 2018 season of Hard Knocks, in a segment where a then-free agent Dez Bryant tours the Cleveland Browns facility.

The song was used in the German TV show "Who steals the show from me" (Wer stiehlt mir die Show) presented by Joko Winterscheidt. (Since 2021)

The song was featured in the 2023 Netflix series Quarterback over a highlight reel of Patrick Mahomes.

The song was used in the intro for Comedy Central's Roast of Alec Baldwin in 2019.

The song was featured in the 2018 video game Pro Evolution Soccer 2019.

The song was featured at the beginning of Chicago Med season 3 episode 8, “Lemons and Lemonade”.

It was featured in the 2019 movie The Perfect Date.

It was also featured in the 2026 movie Masters of the Universe.

== Track listing ==
- Digital download
1. "The Man" – 4:08

== Credits and personnel ==
Credits adapted from the liner notes of Wonderful Wonderful.

=== Personnel ===
The Killers

- Brandon Flowers – vocals, keys
- Dave Keuning – guitar
- Mark Stoermer – bass
- Ronnie Vannucci Jr. – drums

Additional personnel

- Jacknife Lee – production, engineering, guitar, keys, programming
- Matt Bishop – engineering
- Robert Root – engineering
- Malcolm Harrison – engineering assistance
- Erol Alkan – additional production, drum programming, percussion, synth
- Jimmy Robertson – production assistance
- Becca Marie – additional vocals
- Las Vegas Mass Choir – additional vocals
- Nina Fechner – additional vocals
- Justin Diaz – additional vocals
- Dan Grech-Marguerat – mixing, additional programming
- Joel Davies – mixing assistance
- Charles Haydon Hicks – mixing assistance
- John Davis – mastering
- Dave Kutch – mastering

=== Studios ===
- Recorded at 11th Street Records (Las Vegas, Nevada), The Garage (Topanga, California), Battle Born Studios (Las Vegas, Nevada), and The Phantasy Sound (London)
- Mixed at Strongroom (London)
- Mastered at Metropolis (London) and The Mastering Palace (New York City)

== Charts ==
=== Weekly charts ===
Weekly chart performance for "The Man"
Chart (2017)	Peak position
Argentina Anglo (Monitor Latino)	16
Australia (ARIA)	65
Belgium (Ultratip Bubbling Under Flanders)	16
Belgium (Ultratip Bubbling Under Wallonia)	33
Canada Rock (Billboard)	7
Mexico Ingles Airplay (Billboard)	17
Netherlands (Dutch Single Tip)	24
Scottish Singles Sales (Official Charts)	38
Switzerland Airplay (Schweizer Hitparade)	94
UK Singles (Official Charts)	63
US Adult Alternative Airplay (Billboard)	1
US Adult Pop Airplay (Billboard)	31
US Alternative Airplay (Billboard)	2
US Hot Rock & Alternative Songs (Billboard)	5
US Rock & Alternative Airplay (Billboard)	4

=== Year-end charts ===
Year-end chart performance for "The Man"
Chart (2017)	Position
US Adult Alternative Songs (Billboard)	7
US Alternative Airplay (Billboard)	7
US Hot Rock & Alternative Songs (Billboard)	18
US Rock Airplay (Billboard)	9

== Certifications ==
Certifications for "The Man"
Region	Certification	Certified units/sales
Australia (ARIA)	2× Platinum	140,000^{‡}
Brazil (Pro-Música Brasil)	Gold	30,000^{‡}
Canada (Music Canada)	Platinum	80,000^{‡}
New Zealand (RMNZ)	Gold	15,000^{‡}
United Kingdom (BPI)	Gold	400,000^{‡}
United States (RIAA)	Platinum	1,000,000^{‡}
^{‡} Sales+streaming figures based on certification alone.

== Release history ==
Release dates and formats for "The Man"
Region	Date	Format	Label	Ref.
Various	June 14, 2017	Digital download	Island	

== Cover versions ==
A cover by English jazz-pop singer Jamie Cullum was released as the lead single from the soundtrack to the 2018 heist film King of Thieves.
