= Just Another Girl (The Killers song) =

2013 single by The Killers

Single by The Killers

from the album Direct Hits
- Released: November 11, 2013
- Recorded: 2013
- Genre: New wave; pop rock; dance rock
- Length: 4:21
- Label: Island
- Songwriter: Brandon Flowers
- Producer: Stuart Price

The Killers singles chronology
"Shot at the Night" (2013)	"Just Another Girl" (2013)	"Christmas in L.A." (2013)

Music video
- "Just Another Girl" on YouTube

"Just Another Girl" is a song by the American rock band The Killers. It was released as the second single from their compilation album, Direct Hits. The song was premiered on VH1, and subsequently played on mainstream radio.

== Recording and production ==
The song was produced by Stuart Price who had previously worked with the band on the Day & Age album. Brandon Flowers stated in 2013 that "[Stuart Price has] become like my brother now: we work well together, and I'm always impressed with his musicality and his taste. It's in a different vein from 'Shot at the Night', it's more of a narrative. You're 'in' the song in a different way."

== Critical reception ==
"Just Another Girl" was listed as one of NME's Onrepeat list along with a small review. Stating it's "a perfect Killers song," whilst also claiming "The Killers have long stopped sounding like other bands..." Rolling Stone said the song "plays up the group's slightly more restrained side," noting that "Brandon Flowers sounds lovelorn and wistful."

== Music video ==
The accompanying music video was released on November 25 and was directed by Warren Fu. The video features Dianna Agron who plays Brandon Flowers in a variety of scenes reminiscent of some of the band's famous videos. It starts with Agron in a Flowers-like blazer with feather shoulders performing on the set of Human alongside the other band members, Dave Keuning, Ronnie Vannucci, Jr. and Mark Stoermer. She continues to progress through the band's history and makes appearances in "When You Were Young", "Spaceman", "Mr. Brightside" and "Runaways" style sets among others. The video was filmed at Mack Sennett Studios in Silver Lake. The video ends with both Agron and Flowers singing onscreen before Agron flips a giant switch that releases confetti. Keuning then walks away playing a guitar before the band's trademark "K" stage prop, used during the Day & Age World Tour, is shown.

When reviewing the video, Rolling Stone noted that "It all adds up to a fun history lesson that makes perfect sense within the context of Direct Hits."

== Charts ==
Chart (2013)	Peak position
Belgium (Ultratip Bubbling Under Wallonia)	32
Ireland (IRMA)	85
Mexico Ingles Airplay (Billboard)	49
UK Singles (Official Charts)	83
US Rock Songs (Billboard)	50
US Rock Digital Songs (Billboard)	23
