= Miss Atomic Bomb =

Single by The Killers

from the album Battle Born
- Released: October 23, 2012
- Recorded: 2011–2012
- Studio: Battle Born (Las Vegas)
- Genre: Heartland rock, new wave
- Length: 4:54 (Album version); 4:07 (Radio edit)
- Label: Island
- Songwriters: Brandon Flowers, Ronnie Vannucci Jr.
- Producer: Stuart Price

The Killers singles chronology
"Runaways" (2012)	"Miss Atomic Bomb" (2012)	"I Feel It in My Bones" (2012)

Music video
- "Miss Atomic Bomb" on YouTube

"Miss Atomic Bomb" is a song from American rock band The Killers. The track was sent to mainstream radio on October 23, 2012, as the second single taken from the band's fourth studio album, Battle Born. It topped the Rolling Stone Readers' Poll for the Best Song of 2012. It has been remixed by The Chainsmokers.

== Music video ==
The band released two music videos for "Miss Atomic Bomb", with a tour video directed by Giorgio Testi released on November 2, which captures footage of the band performing in the UK while on their Battle Born World Tour. The second, and official video was released over one month later, on December 11. The video was directed by Warren Fu, who had directed Battle Born's first single, "Runaways".

Part live action and part animation, "Miss Atomic Bomb" has been dubbed "the epic companion to Mr. Brightside", and the video continues the love triangle depicted in the 2004 hit "Mr. Brightside" music video. "Miss Atomic Bomb" sees actress Izabella Miko and actor Eric Roberts reprise their roles from the "Mr. Brightside" video. As "Miss Atomic Bomb" is considered to be a companion to "Mr. Brightside", the premise of the music video is similar but broader.

=== Synopsis ===
The music video begins with an elderly man sitting alone in his trailer home, reflecting on his past when he notices a letter on his doormat. The memories take form in animation, featuring the man in his youth, depicted as an animated Brandon Flowers, in the company of his band (animated versions of Keuning, Stoermer, and Vannucci). He is watching a young girl's (Izabella Miko) dance recital from his garage when she notices him observing her, before they are interrupted by her teacher who draws the curtains. However, he later seeks her out at her home, and it is presumed that they fall in love with each other.

One night, the young woman has finished a performance but grows tired of her teacher and runs off from the stage to seek out Flowers. He is happy to see her when she finds him; and, he takes her through a motorbike ride through the desert. However, the paranoid jealousy that Flowers bears begins to surface as he catches sight of a faceless stranger in the desert, which is likely to be a figment of his imagination. Later, when the woman is shown to have won the Miss Atomic Bomb pageant alongside her dance partner (Eric Roberts), a surly Flowers who is performing at the pageant with his band, becomes more resentful and believes that the man is in love with his girlfriend. Akin to the events in "Mr Brightside", the imaginary stranger in the desert forms its identity as the dance partner and Flowers makes his way towards the young woman's house in a troubled state. He arrives there on New Year's Eve in Las Vegas to propose to her, but he catches sight of the car that her dance partner owns and becomes certain that she is having an affair with him. He leaves the engagement ring on the ground and walks away. As he walks through Las Vegas, he has hallucinations of women who are kissing other men as his girlfriend kissing her dance partner. Flowers then ages visibly and heads for his trailer home in the desert as he is plagued by visions of the young woman's fate after he abandoned her on that night all those years ago.

The video then transitions to real-life acting, showing the elderly man in the present opening a letter from his then-girlfriend. Glimpses of the writing reveal that she was uncertain about what had happened the night that he had walked away from her on New Year's Eve. The memories then repeat in live acting, with the young woman tearfully holding up the engagement ring that he had left behind and recalling the night that she had found him in the desert. The young woman is shown to be dancing alone in her apartment, although Flowers imagines her partner kissing her behind the curtains. It is revealed that all the events which occurred from Flowers' point of view were fictional and that it was indeed his paranoid jealousy which overcame him. As the New Year's countdown ends, the young woman rushes out onto her balcony in excitement, only to see Flowers standing in the street glaring up at her and then walking away bitterly, leaving her in confusion. The last shots of the music video show the letter on the doormat disappearing and the elderly man sitting alone in his trailer home, reflecting on his past as a photo of the young woman on his shelf slowly begins to fade from view.

== Charts ==
Chart performance for "Miss Atomic Bomb"
Chart (2012)	Peak position
Belgium (Ultratip Bubbling Under Flanders)	22
Belgium (Ultratip Bubbling Under Wallonia)	31
Switzerland Airplay (Schweizer Hitparade)	61
US Rock & Alternative Airplay (Billboard)	35
US Alternative Airplay (Billboard)	23

== Accolades ==
Accolades for "Miss Atomic Bomb"
Publication	Country	Accolade	Year	Rank
KROQ	United States	Top 50 Songs Of 2012	2012	43

== Personnel ==
Credits adapted from the liner notes of the deluxe edition of Battle Born.

=== The Killers ===
- Brandon Flowers
- Dave Keuning
- Mark Stoermer
- Ronnie Vannucci Jr.

=== Additional musicians ===
- Stuart Price – additional keyboards and programming

=== Technical ===
- Stuart Price – production, mixing
- Robert Root – recording

=== Studios ===
- Battle Born Studios (Las Vegas, Nevada) – recording and mixing

== See also ==
- Miss Atomic (pageants)
