= Wonderful Wonderful (The Killers song) =

Promotional single by The Killers

from the album Wonderful Wonderful
- Released: August 24, 2017
- Studio: 11th Street Records; The Garage; Battle Born
- Genre: Post-punk; gothic rock
- Length: 5:10
- Label: Island
- Songwriters: Brandon Flowers; Mark Stoermer; Ronnie Vannucci Jr.; Jacknife Lee
- Producer: Jacknife Lee

Lyric video
- "Wonderful Wonderful" on YouTube

"Wonderful Wonderful" is a song by American rock band The Killers for their fifth studio album Wonderful Wonderful (2017). It was released on August 24, 2017 as the first promotional single from the album. Nearly a year later on August 23, 2018, the band released a music video for the title track.

== Background and release ==
According to the band's vocalist Brandon Flowers, the idea for the title of the song and album came when he was in the desert and saw a storm coming his way: "I thought 'wonderful, wonderful' and I was able to use it in a song that I wrote with Mark, our bass player, and it ended being an important part of the record." He also mentioned that "Wonderful Wonderful" has "some of the coolest production on the record." Drummer Ronnie Vannucci Jr. revealed that no idea was too weird or out-of-the-box in Jacknife Lee's studio: "It looked like a kid's playroom with Legos everywhere, except instead of Legos, it was pedals and wires and a lot of experimentation." Flowers also explained that the song finds the band going to "darker territories" than they've ever been into before: "I hear things in it that remind me of things that I grew up loving. Also, that I haven't been able to touch upon and that was helpful. I started it with Mark, our bass player, and he's more a minor key type of a guy and he brought that out of me."

The song premiered on August 24, 2017 on Beats 1 as Zane Lowe's World Record. It was then released on digital retailers and streaming services as the album's first promotional single.

== Composition ==
"Wonderful Wonderful" is a post-punk and gothic rock song with a decidedly minor-key composition, filled with mournful horn lines and glitchy electronic accents. It was composed by Brandon Flowers, Mark Stoermer, Ronnie Vanucci Jr. and Jacknife Lee, who was also responsible for producing the song.

== Critical reception ==
The song received generally positive reviews from music critics. Kory Grow from Rolling Stone called the track a "dusky mood piece that recalls later Depeche Mode and maybe a little Talk Talk". Mark Savage of BBC News said the song is "built around a wonderfully menacing bassline with Flowers in full ranting preacher mode". Musically, Stereogum's Pranav Trewn opined the song is a "fascinating swirl of influences that expands The Killers' palette for once not by reaching up for bigger choruses and grander gestures, nor by dressing old Springsteen affectations in a glam moonlight, but rather through pushing outward the range of sounds in their arsenal."

== Credits and personnel ==
Credits adapted from the liner notes of the deluxe edition of Wonderful Wonderful.

=== Personnel ===
The Killers

- Brandon Flowers – vocals, keys
- Mark Stoermer – bass, guitar
- Ronnie Vannucci Jr. – drums

Additional personnel

- Jacknife Lee – production, engineering, guitar, keys, programming
- Matt Bishop – engineering
- Robert Root – engineering
- Malcolm Harrison – assistant engineering
- Rich Costey – mixing
- Martin Cooke – mixing assistance
- Nicolas Fournier – mixing assistance

=== Recording locations ===
- Recorded at 11th Street Records (Las Vegas, Nevada), The Garage (Topanga, California) and Battle Born Studios (Las Vegas, Nevada) – recording
- Mastered at Metropolis (London)

== Release history ==
Region	Date	Format	Label	Ref.
United Kingdom	August 24, 2017	Digital download, streaming	Island	
