= Battle Born (album) =

Studio album by the Killers
- Released: September 17, 2012
- Recorded: October 2011 – May 2012
- Studios: Battle Born (Las Vegas, Nevada); Blackbird (Nashville, Tennessee); Germano Studios The Hit Factory (New York City)
- Genres: Alternative rock; heartland rock; new wave
- Length: 51:18
- Label: Island
- Producers: The Killers; Daniel Lanois; Steve Lillywhite; Brendan O'Brien; Stuart Price

The Killers chronology
(Red) Christmas EP (2011)	Battle Born (2012)	Direct Hits (2013)

Singles from Battle Born
- 1. "Runaways" Released: July 17, 2012; 2. "Miss Atomic Bomb" Released: October 23, 2012; 3. "Here with Me" Released: December 16, 2012

Battle Born is the fourth studio album by American rock band the Killers. It was released in the United Kingdom on September 17, 2012, by Vertigo Records and in the United States the following day by Island Records. The phrase "Battle Born" appears on the state flag of Nevada and is the name of the recording studio owned by the band, where the majority of the album was recorded.

Recorded following an extended hiatus, the band worked with five producers during the recording of the album: Steve Lillywhite, Damian Taylor, Brendan O'Brien, Stuart Price, and Daniel Lanois.

== Background and recording ==
Following the completion of the band's Day & Age World Tour in January 2010, the Killers announced that the band would be entering an extended hiatus. During this time, frontman Brandon Flowers and bassist Mark Stoermer released solo albums, Flamingo (2010) and Another Life (2011), respectively, while drummer Ronnie Vannucci Jr. released a studio album with his side-project, Big Talk, and recorded with Mt. Desolation. Regarding the band's hiatus, Flowers noted, "Dave needed to see his kid and rest up. That was just how it worked. And so we ended up going off and doing solo things, and spending our time that way, and that was good, too. It was a good experience. It definitely taught us different ways of thinking about music."

In October 2011, the band ended its hiatus to begin work on a fourth studio album. Initial sessions were strained, with Flowers noting that the band members spent "about a week just eyeballing each other in a room." The composition of the album's first single, "Runaways", marked a turning point in their reunion, with Flowers noting: "That and 'Miss Atomic Bomb' were the backbone of this record. They made me feel we were on the right track."

Working at their Las Vegas studio, Battle Born, the band worked with producers Steve Lillywhite, Damian Taylor, Brendan O'Brien, Stuart Price, and Daniel Lanois. Initially, the band had wanted to work with just one, but scheduling difficulties led to the need for multiple producers.

The album was partially mixed by Alan Moulder, who also worked on the band's first two albums.

== Release ==
On June 7, 2012, the Killers released a trailer for Battle Born. The track listing was announced on August 16. The album's first single was "Runaways", which received its first radio play on July 10. The single was leaked on Tumblr only hours before its official radio preview. Battle Born was released on September 17, 2012, in the United Kingdom and on September 18 in the United States. A week later, on September 25, the album was released as a vinyl disc.

== Critical reception ==
Professional ratings
Aggregate scores
Source	Rating
Metacritic	64/100
Review scores
Source	Rating
AllMusic	3.5/5 stars
The A.V. Club	B
Entertainment Weekly	B
The Guardian	3/5 stars
Melodic	4/5 stars
NME	7/10
Q	4/5 stars
Rolling Stone	3/5 stars
Slant Magazine	3/5 stars
Spin	8/10

Battle Born received generally positive reviews from music critics. At Metacritic, which assigns a normalized rating out of 100 to reviews from mainstream publications, the album received an average score of 64, based on 27 reviews.

Kyle Anderson of Entertainment Weekly wrote:

The Killers themselves have always gone for the gold, boldly aiming to fill exotic stadiums with full-throated anthems about big ideas. Like the band's previous output, Battle Born only knows how to be epic: Opener "Flesh and Bone" begins as a glitchy Soft Cell throwback before rapidly expanding into a glorious fireworks-and-brimstone sermon, while "Miss Atomic Bomb" drives into the desert sunset in a convertible fueled by echoey guitars and glistening-eyed nostalgia. These are big songs, determined to deliver photo-finish climaxes every few seconds.

The Guardian's Kate Mossman gave the album three out of five stars, saying:

With stagey soundscapes more Meat Loaf than Springsteen, and lines overloaded with postcard imagery ("Your star-spangled heart took a train for the coast"), you struggle to find the energy till the third or fourth listen, when "Heart of a Girl" (co-written with Daniel Lanois) and "From Here on Out" (which sounds just like the Eagles) reveal themselves to be the sweetest, most sincere explorations of a kind of US rock that will always raise hairs on the necks of those who like this sort of thing.

=== Accolades ===
Battle Born was voted the second Best Album of 2012 by the readers of Rolling Stone magazine. Fuse's staff listed it as the 23rd Best Album of 2012.

Battle Born on critics' lists and readers' polls
Publication	Country	Accolade	Year	Rank
Fuse	United States	The 40 Best Albums of 2012	2012	23
Rolling Stone	United States	The Best Albums of 2012: Readers' Poll	2012	2

== Commercial performance ==
Battle Born debuted at number three on the US Billboard 200, selling 113,000 copies in its opening week. As of September 2014, it had sold 344,158 copies in the United States. The album debuted atop the UK Albums Chart with first-week sales of 93,989 copies—at that point the third highest opening tally of 2012—becoming the band's fourth consecutive number-one studio album in the United Kingdom. It had sold 371,000 copies in the United Kingdom as of August 2020. Battle Born also debuted at number three on the Canadian Albums Chart, selling 12,000 copies. The album reached the top 10 in 20 countries and became the 45th best-selling album worldwide of 2012, with sales of one million copies by the end of 2012.

== Track listing ==
No.	Title	Writer(s)	Producer(s)	Length
1.	"Flesh and Bone"	Brandon Flowers (lyrics); The Killers (music)	Steve Lillywhite; Damian Taylor	4:01
2.	"Runaways"	Flowers (lyrics); The Killers (music)	Brendan O'Brien; Lillywhite^{[a]}; Taylor^{[a]}	4:04
3.	"The Way It Was"	Flowers; Dave Keuning; Mark Stoermer; Ronnie Vannucci Jr.; Daniel Lanois	O'Brien	3:51
4.	"Here with Me"	Flowers; Fran Healy	O'Brien	4:52
5.	"A Matter of Time"	Flowers; Keuning; Stoermer; Vannucci	Taylor; Lillywhite	4:11
6.	"Deadlines and Commitments"	Flowers (lyrics); The Killers (music)	Taylor	4:22
7.	"Miss Atomic Bomb"	Flowers; Vannucci	Stuart Price	4:53
8.	"The Rising Tide"	Flowers (lyrics); The Killers (music)	The Killers	4:17
9.	"Heart of a Girl"	Flowers; Keuning; Stoermer; Vannucci; Lanois	Lillywhite; Lanois	4:34
10.	"From Here on Out"	Flowers (lyrics); The Killers (music)	Lillywhite	2:27
11.	"Be Still"	Flowers; Lanois	Taylor	4:33
12.	"Battle Born"	Flowers; Keuning; Stoermer; Vannucci	Lillywhite	5:13

Deluxe edition bonus tracks
No.	Title	Writer(s)	Producer(s)	Length
13.	"Carry Me Home"	Flowers (lyrics); The Killers (music)	Price	3:45
14.	"Flesh and Bone" (Jacques Lu Cont remix)	Flowers (lyrics); The Killers (music)	Lillywhite; Taylor; Jacques Lu Cont^{[b]}	5:45
15.	"Prize Fighter"	Flowers; Vannucci	Lillywhite	4:38

Exclusive edition bonus tracks (selected retailers)
No.	Title	Writer(s)	Producer(s)	Length
16.	"Be Still" (alternate version)	Flowers; Lanois	Taylor	4:18
17.	"Runaways" (Michel remix)	Flowers (lyrics); The Killers (music)	O'Brien; Lillywhite^{[a]}; Taylor^{[a]}; Michel^{[a]}^{[b]}	4:21

=== Notes ===
- ^{^[a]} signifies an additional producer
- ^{^[b]} signifies a remixer

== Personnel ==
Credits adapted from the liner notes of the deluxe edition of Battle Born.

=== The Killers ===
- Brandon Flowers
- Dave Keuning
- Mark Stoermer
- Ronnie Vannucci Jr.

=== Additional musicians ===
- Stuart Price – additional keyboards and programming (tracks 7, 13)
- Damian Taylor – keyboards and programming (tracks 9, 12)
- Las Vegas Master Singers – background vocals (tracks 9, 12)
- Alissa Fleming – violin (track 12)
- Jennifer Eriksson – violin (track 12)
- Nate Kimball – trombone (track 15)
- Isaac Tubb – trumpet (track 15)

=== Technical ===
- Steve Lillywhite – production (tracks 1, 5, 9, 10, 12, 14, 15); additional production (track 2); mixing (track 9)
- Damian Taylor – production (tracks 1, 5, 6, 11, 14); mixing (tracks 1, 6, 11, 12, 14); additional production (track 2)
- Robert Root – recording (tracks 1, 2, 5–15); mixing (tracks 1, 3, 8–10, 14, 15)
- Brendan O'Brien – production, recording (tracks 2–4); mixing (track 4)
- Alan Moulder – mixing (tracks 2, 5, 12)
- Catherine Marks – mix engineering (track 2)
- John Catlin – mix engineering (track 2)
- Felix Rashman – mixing assistance (track 2)
- Kenta Yonesaka – engineering assistance (tracks 5, 12)
- Stuart Price – production, mixing (track 7, 13); remix (track 14)
- The Killers – production (track 8)
- Daniel Lanois – production (track 9)
- Emily Lazar – mastering
- Joe LaPorta – mastering

=== Artwork ===
- Warren Fu – art direction, design
- Martin Gomez – layout
- Williams + Hirakawa – photography
- Wyatt Boswell – additional photos
- Kristen Yiengst – art and photography production
- Doug Joswick – package production

=== Studios ===
- Battle Born Studios (Las Vegas, Nevada) – recording (tracks 1, 2, 5–15); mixing (tracks 1, 3, 6–11, 13–15)
- Blackbird Studios (Nashville, Tennessee) – recording (tracks 2–4); mixing (track 4)
- Golden Ratio (Montreal) – mixing (tracks 1, 6, 11, 14)
- Assault and Battery 1 (London) – mixing (track 2)
- Germano Studios (New York City) – mixing (tracks 5, 12)
- The Lodge (New York City) – mastering

== Charts ==
=== Weekly charts ===
Chart (2012)	Peak position
Australian Albums (ARIA)	2
Austrian Albums (Ö3 Austria)	3
Belgian Albums (Ultratop Flanders)	6
Belgian Albums (Ultratop Wallonia)	14
Canadian Albums (Billboard)	3
Croatian Albums (HDU)	20
Czech Albums (ČNS IFPI)	17
Danish Albums (Hitlisten)	8
Dutch Albums (Album Top 100)	7
Finnish Albums (Suomen virallinen lista)	10
French Albums (SNEP)	29
German Albums (Offizielle Top 100)	2
Greek Albums (IFPI)	23
Hungarian Albums (MAHASZ)	37
Irish Albums (IRMA)	1
Italian Albums (FIMI)	7
Japanese Albums (Oricon)	38
Mexican Albums (Top 100 Mexico)	2
New Zealand Albums (RMNZ)	2
Norwegian Albums (VG-lista)	2
Polish Albums (ZPAV)	22
Portuguese Albums (AFP)	4
Russian Albums (2M)	16
Scottish Albums (Official Charts)	1
South Korean Albums (Gaon) Deluxe edition	41
South Korean Albums (Gaon) Standard edition	58
Spanish Albums (Promusicae)	3
Swedish Albums (Sverigetopplistan)	5
Swiss Albums (Schweizer Hitparade)	2
UK Albums (Official Charts)	1
US Billboard 200	3
US Top Alternative Albums (Billboard)	1
US Top Rock Albums (Billboard)	1

=== Year-end charts ===
Chart (2012)	Position
Australian Albums (ARIA)	98
Mexican Albums (Top 100 Mexico)	57
Swiss Albums (Schweizer Hitparade)	98
UK Albums (OCC)	27
US Billboard 200	140
US Top Alternative Albums (Billboard)	23
US Top Rock Albums (Billboard)	39
Worldwide Albums (IFPI)	45

Chart (2013)	Position
UK Albums (OCC)	188

== Certifications and sales ==
Region	Certification	Certified units/sales
Australia (ARIA)	Gold	35,000^{^}
Canada (Music Canada)	Gold	40,000^{‡}
Ireland (IRMA)	Gold	7,500^{^}
Mexico (AMPROFON)	Gold	30,000^{^}
United Kingdom (BPI)	Platinum	371,000
United States	—	344,158
Summaries
Worldwide	—	1,000,000
^{^} Shipments figures based on certification alone.^{‡} Sales+streaming figures based on certification alone.
