= Some Kind of Love =

Promotional single by the Killers

from the album Wonderful Wonderful
- Released: September 15, 2017
- Genre: Synth-pop; dream pop; art pop
- Length: 4:38
- Label: Island
- Songwriters: Brandon Flowers; Jacknife Lee; Brian Eno
- Producer: Lee

Audio video
- "Some Kind of Love" on YouTube

"Some Kind of Love" is a song by American rock band the Killers for their fifth studio album Wonderful Wonderful (2017). It was released on September 15, 2017 as the album's second promotional single. The song is dedicated to Brandon Flowers' wife and features additional vocals by the Flowers' three sons.

== Background and release ==
The Killers' frontman Brandon Flowers has stated that once he started writing personal songs for the band's upcoming album Wonderful Wonderful, he began to second-guess himself, and so, he decided to play some of them to his wife Tana, who has PTSD: "I'd never done anything like that before, where we'd sit down and play the songs for her, and explain it, and see if it made sense to her, and got her approval". He mentioned "Some Kind of Love" as the track that "struck a chord" with her as he wrote it particularly to lift his wife's spirits.

It was released as the second promotional single from the album on September 15, 2017 through digital retailers and streaming services.

== Composition ==
"Some Kind of Love" is a synth-pop, dream pop and art pop song composed by Brandon Flowers and Jacknife Lee. It contains interpolations from Brian Eno's "An Ending (Ascent)", which was the main inspiration for the song. According to Flowers, the band asked for his permission to sample the song in their 2006 album Sam's Town, but he declined. Despite being rejected, Flowers was determined ever since he had a dream about him. After Bono and Anton Corbijn texted and e-mailed Eno, Flowers was finally able to talk to him: "What we found out is that he'd told his manager, 'I don't want to use this song anymore'. He didn't know a band was gonna try to sing on it. I told him the story about the dream, and it was pretty funny. He gave his seal of approval, and he likes it." Flowers also revealed that the song contains his three sons as backing vocals, which caused his wife Tana to cry once she heard it: "It's really emotional. I played that for her, and she just sobbed. But I'm proud of that one."

== Critical reception ==
"Some Kind of Love" received mixed to positive reviews from music critics. Rolling Stone's Rory Crow described the song as "an almost ethereal meditation on love". Lisa Nguyen from Paste Magazine noted the track is "a delicate lullaby compared to all the punchy singles we've heard so far from the forthcoming album". However, Stereogum's Pranav Trewn called it "the most boring song Chris Martin never wrote", stating the track "just plods along without ever justifying the amount of space it takes up".

== Credits and personnel ==
Credits adapted from the liner notes of the deluxe edition of Wonderful Wonderful.

=== Recording locations ===
- Recorded at 11th Street Records (Las Vegas, Nevada), The Garage (Topanga, California), and Battle Born Studios (Las Vegas, Nevada)
- Mastered at Metropolis (London)

=== Personnel ===
The Killers

- Brandon Flowers – vocals, keys
- Mark Stoermer – fretless bass
- Ronnie Vannucci Jr. – drums

Additional personnel

- Matt Bishop – recording engineering
- Malcolm Harrison – assistant recording engineering
- Jacknife Lee – guitar, keyboards, production, programming, recording engineering, mixing
- Robert Root – recording engineering

== Release history ==
| Region | Date | Format | Label | Ref. |
|---|---|---|---|---|
| United Kingdom | September 15, 2017 | Digital download, streaming | Island | |
