= Run for Cover (The Killers song) =

2017 single by the Killers

Single by the Killers

from the album Wonderful Wonderful
- Released: November 14, 2017
- Studio: 11th Street Records (Las Vegas, Nevada); The Garage (Topanga, California); Battle Born (Las Vegas, Nevada)
- Genre: New wave; post-punk revival; pop rock; heartland rock; synth-pop
- Length: 3:42
- Label: Island
- Songwriters: Brandon Flowers; Mark Stoermer; Ronnie Vannucci Jr.; Alex Cameron; Jacknife Lee; Bob Marley; Stuart Price
- Producer: Jacknife Lee

The Killers singles chronology
"The Man" (2017)	"Run for Cover" (2017)	"Rut" (2017)

Music video
- "Run for Cover" on YouTube

"Run for Cover" is a song by American rock band the Killers from their fifth studio album, Wonderful Wonderful (2017). Originally released as a promotional single on July 28, 2017, the song was sent to alternative radio in the United States on November 14, 2017, serving as the album's second single.

== Background and release ==
The Killers' vocalist Brandon Flowers revealed that "Run for Cover" was originally written for their 2008 album Day & Age with producer Stuart Price, but it was not completed due to Flowers not being able to finish the second verse of the song at the time. According to drummer Ronnie Vannucci, The song was originally "slower, sweeter and busier". After meeting with Australian musician Alex Cameron in Las Vegas, Flowers finally had a breakthrough as they kept on working together until the second verse was finished. In the beginning of 2017, Flowers revealed the song had a good shot of being featured on the band's album.

The song contains the first overtly political references in a Killers song. Flowers told NME that the song was partly a response to the first presidency of Donald Trump, although the lyrics were not a direct reference to Trump, having mostly been written nine years prior to the song's release.

The Killers debuted "Run for Cover" during a concert at Borgata in Atlantic City on June 10, 2017. On July 28, the song was released as a promotional single from Wonderful Wonderful.

== Composition and lyrical interpretation ==
"Run for Cover" has been characterized under the genres new wave, post-punk revival, pop rock, heartland rock, and synth-pop, and was written by Flowers, Mark Stoermer, Ronnie Vannucci Jr., Alex Cameron, Jacknife Lee, and Stuart Price. Although it was initially produced by the latter, the track's production was finished by Lee.

The song contains an interpolation of Bob Marley's "Redemption Song".

Lyrically, the song talks about domestic violence as Flowers tells a woman to "run for cover" from her abusive husband while she still can.

== Critical reception ==
The song received critical acclaim from music critics. Andrew Trendell from NME described it as a "synth-pop banger driven by post-punk propulsion" and noted the similarity in sound to that of Sam's Town. Rolling Stone's Daniel Kreps called it a "glossy, buoyant track that proves the band hasn't strayed from their textbook sound." The Musical Hype! gave the song four out of five stars and said: "All in all, 'Run for Cover' is a well-rounded, energetic, and up-tempo record from The Killers. Does it trump 'The Man'? It depends upon who you ask, but true to the band's style, this is next-level. Elite? Yes."

== Music video ==
The music video for "Run for Cover" was directed by Tarik Mikou and released on August 22, 2017. The video tells the story of a woman who tries to run away from her ex-lover, backing up the recurring abusive relationship theme of the song's lyrics. After getting hit by him with a car, she gets up and sets the vehicle on fire with him inside. The cassette tape she is holding onto in the video reads "07/28/17", referring to the release date of the single.

== Track listing ==
- Digital download – remix
1. "Run for Cover" (Naderi remix) – 4:15

== Credits and personnel ==
Credits adapted from the liner notes of Wonderful Wonderful.

=== Personnel ===
The Killers

- Brandon Flowers – vocals, keys
- Mark Stoermer – bass
- Ronnie Vannucci Jr. – drums

Additional personnel

- Jacknife Lee – production, engineering, guitar, keys, programming
- Matt Bishop – engineering
- Robert Root – engineering
- Malcolm Harrison – engineering assistance
- Ariel Rechtshaid – mixing
- Shawn Everett – mixing
- John Davis – mastering

=== Studios ===
- Recorded at 11th Street Records (Las Vegas, Nevada), The Garage (Topanga, California), and Battle Born Studios (Las Vegas, Nevada)
- Mastered at Metropolis (London)

== Charts ==
=== Weekly charts ===
Weekly chart performance for "Run for Cover"
Chart (2017–2018)	Peak position
Belgium (Ultratip Bubbling Under Flanders)	6
Canada Rock (Billboard)	6
Mexico Ingles Airplay (Billboard)	34
UK Singles (OCC)	100
US Adult Alternative Airplay (Billboard)	20
US Hot Rock & Alternative Songs (Billboard)	19
US Rock & Alternative Airplay (Billboard)	7

=== Year-end charts ===
Year-end chart performance for "Run for Cover"
Chart (2018)	Position
US Alternative Airplay (Billboard)	22
US Hot Rock & Alternative Songs (Billboard)	59
US Rock Airplay Songs (Billboard)	29

== Certifications ==
Certifications for "Run for Cover"
Region	Certification	Certified units/sales
Australia (ARIA)	Gold	35,000^{‡}
Canada (Music Canada)	Gold	40,000^{‡}
New Zealand (RMNZ)	Gold	15,000^{‡}
United Kingdom (BPI)	Silver	200,000^{‡}
^{‡} Sales+streaming figures based on certification alone.

== Release history ==
Release dates and formats for "Run for Cover"
Region	Date	Format	Label	Ref(s)
Various	July 28, 2017 (Note: Release as a promotional single)	Digital download; streaming	Island	
United States	November 14, 2017	Alternative radio	Island	
Various	January 19, 2018	Digital download (Naderi remix)	Island	
