= Here with Me (The Killers song) =

Single by The Killers

from the album Battle Born
- Released: December 16, 2012
- Recorded: 2011–2012
- Studio: Blackbird (Nashville)
- Genre: Soft rock
- Length: 4:52
- Label: Island
- Songwriters: Brandon Flowers, Fran Healy
- Producer: Brendan O'Brien

The Killers singles chronology
"I Feel It in My Bones" (2012)	"Here with Me" (2012)	"Shot at the Night" (2013)

Music video
- "Here with Me" on YouTube

"Here with Me" is a single from American rock band The Killers' fourth studio album, Battle Born. It was released as the third single from the album on December 16, 2012, and was written by Brandon Flowers and Fran Healy.

== Critical reception ==
The track "Here with Me" received mixed reviews from critics. Some critics criticized the lyrics "don't want your picture on my cell phone, I want you here with me" for being too sentimental, but praised the horns-and-strings instrumental composition. Other critics praised The Killers for being able to authentically bridge the song and the album Battle Born with the rest of their music.

== Chart performance ==
Following the single release and Cassadee Pope and The Killers' performance on The Voice, "Here with Me" peaked on several Billboard charts. Although the single did not reach the Billboard Hot 100, it peaked at number 19 on the Bubbling Under Hot 100 Chart. The single was fairly successful in the rock charts. It peaked at number 18 on the Rock Songs chart and number 13 on the Rock Digital Singles. Furthermore, the single peaked at number 10 on the Alternative Digital Songs chart, internationally, "Here with Me" peaked at #88 on the Canadian Hot 100.

== Music video ==
The music video for "Here with Me" was released on December 14, 2012. It was directed by filmmaker Tim Burton, marking his return to directing music videos since his debut with the Killers' song "Bones" six years earlier. It was filmed in Blackpool during the band's break in the middle of a UK tour. Burton was inspired by the film Mad Love (1935).

In the video, a pale young man (Craig Roberts) buys a ticket to see a stage performance by a woman (Winona Ryder) at the Horror Crypt in Blackpool, where he later gazes at her as she signs autographs and takes pictures with fans. Desolate when she leaves, he wanders aimlessly, at one point looking in the window of a diner and hallucinating that everybody inside has the woman's face. To fill the emptiness he feels, he steals a wax mannequin of the woman from the Horror Crypt's lobby and imagines that it is real, taking it to the beach and slow dancing with it at an empty performance hall where the Killers are performing. He prepares a romantic dinner, where he takes off the mannequin's wig and lights a candlewick on its head, before revealing that he is also made of wax by removing his wig and lighting the candlewick on his head. The two smile and raise a glass of wine to each other.

== Live performances ==
The Killers performed "Here with Me" in October 2012 promoting the release of their album Battle Born on Live on Letterman.

== Personnel ==
Credits adapted from the liner notes of the deluxe edition of Battle Born.

=== The Killers ===
- Brandon Flowers
- Dave Keuning
- Mark Stoermer
- Ronnie Vannucci Jr.

=== Technical ===
- Brendan O'Brien – production, recording, mixing
- Emily Lazar – mastering
- Joe LaPorta – mastering

=== Studios ===
- Blackbird Studios (Nashville, Tennessee) – recording and mixing
- The Lodge (New York City) – mastering

== Charts ==
Chart (2012)	Peak position
Belgium (Ultratip Bubbling Under Flanders)	62
Belgium (Ultratip Bubbling Under Wallonia)	25
Canada Hot 100 (Billboard)	88
Switzerland Airplay (Schweizer Hitparade)	93
US Bubbling Under Hot 100 (Billboard)	19
US Rock Songs (Billboard)	18
