= Rut (song) =

Single by the Killers

from the album Wonderful Wonderful
- Released: December 9, 2017
- Studio: 11th Street Records (Las Vegas, Nevada); The Garage (Topanga, California); Battle Born (Las Vegas, Nevada)
- Length: 4:24
- Label: Island
- Songwriters: Brandon Flowers; Dave Keuning; Mark Stoermer; Ronnie Vannucci Jr.; Jacknife Lee
- Producer: Jacknife Lee

The Killers singles chronology
"Run for Cover" (2017)	"Rut" (2017)	"Land of the Free" (2019)

Music video
- "Rut" on YouTube

"Rut" is a song by American rock band the Killers from their fifth studio album, Wonderful Wonderful (2017). It was serviced to UK hot adult contemporary radio on December 9, 2017, as the album's third and final single. The accompanying music video, directed by Danny Drysdale, was released on January 9, 2018, and depicts a woman who suffers from loneliness and depression at several points in her life, from childhood to adulthood. The single peaked at number 10 on the New Zealand Heatseeker Singles chart.

== Composition ==
In an episode of the Song Exploder podcast on October 6, 2017, Brandon Flowers explained that the lyrics of "Rut" were inspired by his wife, Tana Mundkowsky, who struggles with posttraumatic stress disorder (PTSD) due to a traumatizing childhood. "The song is from my wife's point of view, and it's from her perspective. And it's about resilience. So, she's singing to me. It's almost like this submission, it's her accepting like, 'I'm facing this thing'", Flowers said. The pitch on Flowers' vocals was altered to make his voice sound more feminine.

== Credits and personnel ==
Credits adapted from the liner notes of Wonderful Wonderful.

=== Personnel ===
The Killers

- Brandon Flowers – vocals, keys
- Dave Keuning – guitar
- Mark Stoermer – fretless bass
- Ronnie Vannucci Jr. – drums

Additional personnel

- Jacknife Lee – production, engineering, guitar, keys, programming
- Matt Bishop – engineering
- Robert Root – engineering
- Malcolm Harrison – engineering assistance
- Alan Moulder – mixing
- Caesar Edmunds – mix engineering
- Becca Marie – additional vocals
- Las Vegas Mass Choir – additional vocals
- Nina Fechner – additional vocals
- Justin Diaz – additional vocals
- John Davis – mastering

=== Studios ===
- Recorded at 11th Street Records (Las Vegas, Nevada), The Garage (Topanga, California), and Battle Born Studios (Las Vegas, Nevada)
- Mixed at Assault & Battery Studio 1 (London)
- Mastered at Metropolis (London)

== Charts ==
Chart (2018)	Peak position
New Zealand Heatseekers (RMNZ)	10
