= Shot at the Night =

Single by The Killers

from the album Direct Hits
- Released: September 17, 2013
- Recorded: 2013
- Genre: Synth-pop; pop rock
- Length: 4:02
- Label: Island
- Songwriter: Brandon Flowers
- Producer: Anthony Gonzalez

The Killers singles chronology
"Here with Me" (2012)	"Shot at the Night" (2013)	"Just Another Girl" (2013)

Music video
- "Shot at the Night" on YouTube

"Shot at the Night" is a song by American rock band The Killers. The song serves as the lead single from the band's second compilation album, Direct Hits. The track was unveiled on September 16, 2013, the tenth anniversary of the band's first London show, and sent immediately to mainstream radio.

== Recording and production ==
The song was produced by M83's Anthony Gonzalez, who had supported the band on their Day & Age World Tour. Island Records subsequently suggested Gonzalez as a possible producer for the band, following the success of M83's sixth studio album, Hurry Up, We're Dreaming (2011). Guitarist Dave Keuning noted, "There was a mutual thing like, 'Yeah we think he's good. We'll try him out.' It's something we finally agreed with our label on."

Regarding the band's collaboration with Gonzalez, vocalist Brandon Flowers stated, "He's one of these new school producers. He's a technical wizard, but you can't discount his musicality. A lot of people do, because of the involvement of computers, but he's a real musician, too. He and Stuart Price may be known for working on the digital side of things, but they're also two of the most musical guys I've ever met."

== Critical reception ==
The song has received positive reviews from music critics. NME listed it top of their "10 tracks you have to hear this week 18/09/13", noting "it's a fittingly triumphant mix of Gonzalez's glittering synth-pop and The Killers' own huge-hearted bombast", adding "it has a euphoric chorus that's as reminiscent of '80s power-pop as the anthemic indie that Nevada's finest have become renowned for."

Spin found the track to be a "space-age jewel — with its sparkling electronics, chest-thumping chorus, and Midnight City-reared percussion".

Rolling Stone believed the song ventures into "the fantasia of Eighties pop-rock soundtracks, dripping with hair spray, swaddled in the fog of dry ice", and concluded the song was "solid", and later listed "Shot at the Night" as the hundredth best song of the year.

== Music video ==
The music video for the song was unveiled on September 26, 2013, and was directed by Roboshobo, who had previously worked with the band on Christmas charity singles 'The Cowboy's Christmas Ball' and 'I Feel It In My Bones'. Regarding the choice of director, lead singer Brandon Flowers noted "We always get a ton of treatments for videos where raunchiness and debauchery are at the forefront, regardless of what fire the song is stoking. We liked that Robert's treatment was different and classy, and he pulled it off."

The video features Dark Shadows actress Bella Heathcote, and The Social Network star Max Minghella. Heathcote portrays a working class hotel maid at the Cosmopolitan Hotel in Las Vegas, clearly unsatisfied with her mundane lifestyle, matching the song's melancholic lyrical yearning "Give me a shot at the night...". She accidentally encounters a handsome hotel guest, portrayed by Minghella, and his friends. The two form an instant connection, leading Heathcote's character to abandon her shift and explore Vegas by night with her new found love interest, thus getting her very own "shot at the night". The story is interspersed with scenes of Flowers singing the song from the balcony of his hotel room, as well as inside the room as seen from the reflection of the balcony door.

According to the Nevada Film Commission, the young woman is shown working at the Cosmopolitan Hotel & Casino. The video features famous Las Vegas landmarks such as Treasure Island, The Stratosphere, The Cosmopolitan, Luxor, Caesars, and Downtown Las Vegas." Other locations include A Little White Wedding Chapel and Flamingo Las Vegas.

The Las Vegas Review Journal ranked it as the #2 Best Music Video Filmed in Las Vegas."

== Live performances ==
The Killers performed the song live for the first time at the Life Is Beautiful Festival in Las Vegas, Nevada. The Killers performed the song live on Later... with Jools Holland on November 5, 2013, Jimmy Kimmel Live on November 12, and Ellen on November 15. They also performed the song live at the MTV Europe Music Awards on November 11, and on BBC Maida Vale Studio 4 on November 7. In total, Shot at the Night has been performed live 314 times as of July 2025.

== In popular culture ==
- In 2014, the song was chosen as the "musical backdrop" for CBS Sports and Turner Sports' TV coverage of the NCAA March Madness basketball tournament. A special video was shot by the band at the Skywalk overlooking the Grand Canyon, with the video being shown in various lengths throughout the tournament.
- The song has been used frequently by the Vegas Golden Knights of the National Hockey League since the team's establishment in 2017. After the Golden Knights won the 2023 Stanley Cup Final, a commemorative video was released by the team that used the song, with the video titled "A Shot at the Knight".

== Charts ==
Chart (2013)	Peak position
Belgium (Ultratip Bubbling Under Flanders)	11
Belgium (Ultratip Bubbling Under Wallonia)	36
Canada Hot 100 (Billboard)	90
Canada Rock (Billboard)	34
Ireland (IRMA)	33
Mexico Ingles Airplay (Billboard)	29
Scottish Singles Sales (Official Charts)	19
UK Singles (Official Charts)	23
US Hot Rock & Alternative Songs (Billboard)	22
US Rock & Alternative Airplay (Billboard)	25
US Adult Alternative Airplay (Billboard)	22
US Alternative Airplay (Billboard)	20

== Certifications ==
Region	Certification	Certified units/sales
Australia (ARIA)	Gold	35,000^{‡}
Brazil (Pro-Música Brasil)	Gold	30,000^{‡}
Canada (Music Canada)	Gold	40,000^{‡}
United Kingdom (BPI)	Silver	200,000^{‡}
United States (RIAA)	Gold	500,000^{‡}
^{‡} Sales+streaming figures based on certification alone.

== Accolades ==
Publication	Country	Accolade	Year	Rank
Rolling Stone	United States	100 Best Songs of 2013	2013	100
BBC Radio 1	United Kingdom	100 Hottest Records of 2013	2013	17
