= Bones (The Killers song) =

2006 single by the Killers

Single by the Killers

from the album Sam's Town
- B-side: "Daddy's Eyes"
- Released: November 27, 2006
- Length: 3:46
- Label: Island; Vertigo
- Songwriters: Brandon Flowers; Mark Stoermer; Ronnie Vannucci Jr.
- Producers: Flood; Alan Moulder; The Killers

The Killers singles chronology
"When You Were Young" (2006)	"Bones" (2006)	"A Great Big Sled" (2006)

Music video
- "Bones" on YouTube

"Bones" is a song by American rock band the Killers, written by lead singer Brandon Flowers, bassist Mark Stoermer and drummer Ronnie Vannucci Jr. It is the eighth track on their second album Sam's Town, released in October 2006. It was originally titled "It's Only Natural" in its early stages. Eventually, the song was released as the second single from Sam's Town in late November 2006.

The single did not match the success of its predecessor and new center-piece track, "When You Were Young", only registering on Billboard's Modern Rock Tracks chart in the United States at number 21. The single peaked at number 15 on the UK Singles Chart. The music video for the song is the first directed by filmmaker Tim Burton, who would again collaborate with the band on their video for the 2012 single "Here with Me". The cover features a Desert bighorn sheep, the state mammal of Nevada, where the Killers formed.

== Music video ==
The music video for "Bones" marks the music-video-directing debut of film director Tim Burton. Clips of the band were shot August 17 and 18, 2006, and were edited together along with CGI backgrounds and characters, including a Burton staple: skeletons. Actors Michael Steger and Devon Aoki star in the video.

Scenes from the films Lolita, Creature from the Black Lagoon, and Jason and the Argonauts, more specifically the scenes with Ray Harryhausen's skeleton-men, are shown behind the band. There is a sequence where Flowers' hand is replaced with that of a skeleton. The beach scenes from From Here to Eternity and 10 are recreated with skeleton figures. The leading couple are seen driving onto the beach where the girl removes her hair to reveal her skull and the man pulls off his shirt to reveal his skeleton. The two leading skeletons are later seen running across the beach to embrace, only for them to crash into one another and shatter to pieces. Then, on the beach, a wave comes over to reveal the two skeletons kissing. At the end of the video, the entire band are skeletons, and they all fall apart at the song's final note.

The drive-in depicted unofficially is that of the West Wind Las Vegas Drive-In Theatre located in North Las Vegas, NV. The clothing worn by the band in the video was preserved in an exhibit at the Las Vegas Hard Rock Hotel and Casino's entrance cafe before the cafe was demolished in late 2019. At the 2007 Shockwaves NME Awards, it won the award for best video.

== Awards ==
Awards for "Bones"
Year	Ceremony	Award	Result
2007	Shockwaves NME Awards	Best Video	Won
2007	Q Awards	Best Video	Nominated

== Track listings ==
UK 7-inch and CD

1. "Bones" – 3:46
2. "Daddy's Eyes" – 4:13

UK DVD

1. "Bones" (music video) – 3:46
2. "When You Were Young" (music video) – 5:33

European maxi CD

1. "Bones" – 3:46
2. "Daddy's Eyes" – 4:13
3. "Where the White Boys Dance" – 3:26
4. "Bones" (video) – 3:46
5. "When You Were Young" (music video) – 5:33

== Charts ==
Chart (2006)	Peak position
Australia (ARIA)	22
Canada Rock (Billboard)	33
Ireland (IRMA)	24
New Zealand (Recorded Music NZ)	16
Scottish Singles Sales (Official Charts)	12
UK Singles (Official Charts)	15
US Alternative Airplay (Billboard)	21

== Certifications ==
Region	Certification	Certified units/sales
Australia (ARIA)	Gold	35,000^{‡}
Brazil (Pro-Música Brasil)	Diamond	250,000^{‡}
^{‡} Sales+streaming figures based on certification alone.

== Release history ==
Region	Date	Format	Label	Ref.
United States	October 30, 2006	Modern rock radio	Island	
United Kingdom	November 27, 2006	CD	Vertigo	
Australia	January 22, 2007	CD	Island	
