= Runaways (The Killers song) =

2012 single by the Killers

- Single cover

Single by the Killers

from the album Battle Born
- Released: July 17, 2012
- Recorded: 2011–2012
- Studio: Blackbird (Nashville); Battle Born (Las Vegas)
- Genre: Heartland rock; new wave
- Length: 4:04
- Label: Island
- Composer: The Killers
- Lyricist: Brandon Flowers
- Producer: Brendan O'Brien

The Killers singles chronology
"The Cowboys' Christmas Ball" (2011)	"Runaways" (2012)	"Miss Atomic Bomb" (2012)

Music video
- "Runaways" on YouTube

"Runaways" is a song by American rock band the Killers. It was released in 2012 as the lead single from their fourth studio album, Battle Born (2012).

== Release ==
On July 2, 2012, the band released artwork for the track. On July 10, it received its first radio play on Radio 104.5 and KROQ in the United States and on BBC Radio 1 in the United Kingdom. On July 17, 2012, it was released on iTunes, debuting in the US Alternative top twenty songs at #17.

In the United Kingdom, "Runaways" was released on September 9, 2012.

== Critical reception ==
The song has received positive reviews from music critics. Jon Dolan from Rolling Stone gave the song three stars saying "The first single from the first Killers album in four years is an Eighties-rock fever dream that's crazily big, even by their grandiose standards: a Vesuvian gusher of Springsteen mythos, Toto-Journey power hooks and singer Brandon Flowers’ unmistakable commitment to unmistakable commitment."

Nicky Barrison from NME acclaimed the song, describing it like a grand return, adding "Four years after Day & Age saw them dip their toe into dancier waters, The Killers make their grand return with the Killersiest comeback single you could ever hope to hear. If Day & Age was a stylistic reaction to the unjust critical kicking their second record took, then 'Runaways' is the sound of the band re-embracing their inner Springsteen". Nolan Feening from Entertainment Weekly was receptive to "Runaways", commenting that the song "starts off gently with some bare-bones piano chords and not a whole lot else, but it gains momentum faster than you can remember the lyrics to 'Mr. Brightside'. Four minutes later, you've got a galloping desert rocker good enough to roll with the best of the Vegas quartet's catalog". Mark Richards from Stereoboard.com was enthusiastic about the tune and commented "'Runaways' is a great alternative summer song that will no doubt be buried in air play by the likes of Will Smith's 80s classic".

Nick Bassett from The Re-View praised "the beauty of its heartfelt, retrospective lyrics and rousing stadium chorus [which] stir that feeling of nostalgia that everyone can relate to."

Readers of Rolling Stone chose "Runaways" as the best song of the summer in Readers' Poll: The Top Best Songs of Summer 2012. It was the #1 most downloaded song for South Africa in 2012.

== Music video ==
The music video for the song, directed by Warren Fu, premiered on July 26, 2012. The clip starts with Flowers performing the song with a starry sky on the background. He is later joined by the remaining members of the band, and several backdrops are shown, including the Killers' hometown, Las Vegas.

In September 2012, "Runaways" received a nomination for Best Video at the Q Awards, but lost out to Keane's "Disconnected".

== Personnel ==
Credits adapted from the liner notes of the deluxe edition of Battle Born.

=== The Killers ===
- Brandon Flowers
- Dave Keuning
- Mark Stoermer
- Ronnie Vannucci Jr.

=== Technical ===
- Brendan O'Brien – production, recording (at Blackbird)
- Steve Lillywhite – additional production
- Damian Taylor – additional production
- Robert Root – recording (at Battle Born)
- Alan Moulder – mixing
- Catherine Marks – mix engineering
- John Catlin – mix engineering
- Felix Rashman – mixing assistance
- Emily Lazar – mastering
- Joe LaPorta – mastering

=== Studios ===
- Blackbird Studios (Nashville, Tennessee) – recording
- Battle Born Studios (Las Vegas, Nevada) – recording
- Assault and Battery 1 (London) – mixing
- The Lodge (New York City) – mastering

== Chart performance ==
On July 17, 2012, it was released on iTunes in the United States, debuting in the US Alternative top twenty songs at number 17, and climbing to number 7.

In the United Kingdom, "Runaways" was released on September 9, and entered the UK Singles Chart at number 18. It remained in the top 20 the following week, making "Runaways" the Killers' 10th UK top 20 single.

== Charts ==
=== Weekly charts ===
Chart (2012)	Peak position
Australia (ARIA)	67
Belgium (Ultratip Bubbling Under Flanders)	3
Belgium (Ultratip Bubbling Under Wallonia)	19
Canada Hot 100 (Billboard)	37
Canada (Alternative Rock)	6
Canada Rock (Billboard)	18
Germany (GfK)	44
Ireland (IRMA)	13
Italy (FIMI)	53
Japan (Japan Hot 100)	37
Netherlands (Dutch Top 40)	34
Netherlands (Single Top 100)	64
Mexico Airplay (Billboard International)	43
Scotland Singles (OCC)	13
South Korea (Gaon International Chart)	83
Switzerland Airplay (Schweizer Hitparade)	28
Spain (Promusicae)	28
UK Singles (OCC)	18
US Billboard Hot 100	78
US Adult Alternative Airplay (Billboard)	11
US Alternative Airplay (Billboard)	7
US Hot Rock & Alternative Songs (Billboard)	13

=== Year-end charts ===
Chart (2012)	Position
US Hot Rock & Alternative Songs (Billboard)	41

== Certifications ==
Region	Certification	Certified units/sales
Australia (ARIA)	Platinum	70,000^{‡}
Canada (Music Canada)	Gold	40,000^{‡}
United Kingdom (BPI)	Silver	200,000^{‡}
United States (RIAA)	Gold	500,000^{‡}
^{‡} Sales+streaming figures based on certification alone.

== Accolades ==
Publication	Country	Accolade	Year	Rank
KROQ	United States	Top 50 Songs of 2012	2012	22

== Release history ==
Region	Date	Format	Label
United States	July 10, 2012	Airplay	Island Records
United Kingdom	July 10, 2012	Airplay	Mercury Records
Italy	July 13, 2012	Airplay	Island Records
United States	July 17, 2012	Digital download	Island Records
Italy	July 17, 2012	Digital download	Island Records
United Kingdom	September 7, 2012	Digital download	Mercury Records
