= Battle Born Studios =

Recording studio in Las Vegas, US

Coordinates: 36.1337°N 115.1922°W

- Formerly: Studio Vegas
- Company type: Recording studio
- Industry: Music
- Founded: 2008; 17 years ago in Las Vegas, Nevada
- Headquarters: Las Vegas, United States
- Owners: The Killers
- Website: battlebornstudios.com

Battle Born Studios is a 2,000-square-foot (190 m^{2}) recording studio located in the Las Vegas Valley, Nevada. It is owned by rock band the Killers.

== History ==
Established in the late 1990s as Studio Vegas, the studio was taken over by The Killers in 2008. The studio was opened to all artists on August 26, 2009. Prior to that time, it was used by The Killers and invited artists. The studio adopted its name from the Nevada state flag.

The studio has hosted and/or recorded notable artists including Mötley Crüe, B.B. King, Elton John, and Imagine Dragons. Other artists who have recorded at Battle Born Studios include Howling Bells, The Envy Corps, and David Hopkins.

In promotion of their fourth consecutive UK number 1 studio album Battle Born, The Killers allowed NME to tour the studio.

== Recordings ==
=== Albums ===
- Day & Age (2008, Island Records), US #6, UK #1
- Flamingo (2010, Island Records), US #8, UK #1
- Big Talk (2011, Epitaph Records)
- The Loudest Engine (2011, Cooking Vinyl), UK #151
- It Culls You (2011, self-released)
- Another Life (2011, self-released)
- (Red) Christmas EP (2011, Island Records), US #85, UK #104
- Battle Born (2012, Island Records), US #3, UK #1
- Night Visions (2012, Interscope Records), US #2, UK #2
- Direct Hits (2013, Island Records), US #20, UK #6
- The Desired Effect (2015, Island Records), US #17, UK #1
- Dark Arts (2016, self-released)
- Wonderful Wonderful (2017, Island Records) US #1, UK #1, AUS #1
- Imploding the Mirage (2020, Island Records) US #8, UK #1
- Pressure Machine (2021, Island Records) US #9, UK #1

=== EPs ===
- Imagine Dragons (2009, self-released)
- Hell and Silence (2010, self-released)

=== Singles ===
- "Human" (2008, Island Records), US #32, UK #3
- "Spaceman" (2008, Island Records), US #67, UK #40
- "Crossfire" (2010, Island Records), UK #8
- "Boots" (2010, Island Records), US #79, UK #53
- "Runaways" (2012, Island Records), US #78, UK #18
- "Hear Me" (2012, Interscope Records), UK #37
- "Shot at the Night" (2013, Island Records), UK #23
- "I Can Change" (2015, Island Records), UK #52
- "The Man" (2017, Island Records), UK #63
- "Run for Cover" (2017, Island Records), UK #100
- "Caution" (2020, Island Records), UK #95
- "My Own Soul's Warning" (2020, Island Records), UK #84

=== #1 Singles ===
- "Human" (2008, Island Records), Billboard Hot Dance Club Play #1
- "The Man" (2017, Island Records), Billboard Adult Alternative Songs #1
- "Caution" (2020, Island Records), Billboard Alternative Airplay and Rock Airplay #1

== See also ==
- Music of Nevada
