= The Lodge (audio mastering) =

Audio mastering studio in Manhattan

The Lodge is an audio mastering facility located in Manhattan, New York City. It was founded by Emily Lazar in 1997. Over the years The Lodge has mastered recordings for many well known musicians, including David Bowie, The Subways, Foo Fighters, Lou Reed, Paul McCartney, Sinéad O'Connor, Natalie Merchant, Marianne Faithfull, and Madonna. The engineers have also mastered sound tracks for movies such as American Psycho and Thievery Corporation.
