= The Way of Curve =

Compilation album by Curve
- Released: 17 May 2004
- Recorded: 1991–2004
- Genre: Alternative rock
- Length: 2:24:09
- Label: Anxious Records/ BMG
- Producer: Curve with various others

Curve chronology
| The New Adventures of Curve (2002) | The Way of Curve (2004) | Rare and Unreleased (2010) |

Professional ratings
Review scores
| Source | Rating |
|---|---|
| AllMusic | link |
| Pitchfork | 7.1/10.0 link |

The Way of Curve is a compilation album by Curve.

The album consists of two discs: the first is a greatest hits disc, containing many of Curve's most famous and successful songs; the second contains rare tracks, including one ('In Disguise') that had never been released. The band invited fans to contribute their personal lists of tracks that should appear on the first disc and this was used to help decide the final listing. Those who contributed are name checked on the album sleeve. All tracks were remastered for the release, though some of the tracks (such as "Die Like A Dog") had errors. Only 10,000 copies of the album were made and it is now out-of-print, though it can be partially downloaded from iTunes or bought and fully downloaded on the band's official Bandcamp.

As Curve disbanded shortly after the album's release, The Way of Curve effectively became their career retrospective.

Miss Kittin used "Falling Free (Aphex Twin Mix)" on her mix album A Bugged Out Mix.

== Track listing ==
=== Disc One: The Way of Curve 1990–2004 ===
1. "Ten Little Girls" – 4:28
2. "Coast Is Clear" – 3:59
3. "Clipped" – 3:51
4. "Die Like a Dog" – 4:39
5. "Horror Head" – 3:41
6. "Faît Accompli" – 4:12
7. "Missing Link" – 4:31
8. "Superblaster" – 3:58
9. "Pink Girl With the Blues" – 4:52
10. "Recovery" – 4:31
11. "Chinese Burn" – 4:49
12. "Coming Up Roses" – 4:34
13. "Hell Above Water" – 4:04
14. "Want More Need Less" – 4:34
15. "Perish" – 5:13
16. "Nice and Easy" – 3:27

=== Disc Two: Rare and Unreleased ===
1. "On the Wheel" – 6:02
2. "Triumph" – 4:49
3. "Arms Out" – 4:46
4. "Sigh" – 3:49
5. "Mission From God" – 4:07
6. "Today Is Not the Day" – 3:38
7. "Low and Behold" – 4:14
8. "Nothing Without Me" – 3:11
9. "What a Waste" (feat. Ian Dury) – 4:58
10. "Falling Free" (Aphex Twin mix) – 7:40
11. "Chinese Burn" (Lunatic Calm mix) – 7:24
12. "Coming Up Roses" (Kevin Shields mix) – 6:14
13. "I Feel Love" – 4:35
14. "In Disguise" – 4:10
15. "Sinner" – 5:09
