= Faît Accompli (Curve song) =

Single by Curve

from the album Doppelgänger
- B-side: "Arms Out", "Sigh"
- Released: 24 February 1992
- Recorded: England
- Genre: Alternative rock, shoegazing
- Length: 4:39 (album version); 4:15 (single/video version); 6:29 (ExtendedExtendedExtended version)
- Label: Anxious Records (UK); Anxious/BMG (Europe); Anxious/BMG Arista (AUS)
- Songwriters: Dean Garcia, Toni Halliday
- Producers: Curve, Flood

Curve singles chronology
"Cherry" (1991)	"Faît Accompli" (1992)	"Horror Head" (1992)

Professional ratings
Review scores
Source	Rating
Melody Maker	(positive)

"Faît Accompli" is the first single from the album Doppelgänger by alternative rock band Curve. It was released on 24 February 1992; it reached #22 in the UK singles chart, becoming their highest-charting single in the UK. It was one of the first singles in the UK to reach the Top 40 without a release on 7" vinyl. An extended version of the song was also included in the compilation Pubic Fruit, issued in November 1992 in the US only.

"Faît Accompli" was selected as Single of the Week by Melody Maker.

== Track listing Faît Accompli ==
=== 12" & CD ===
1. "Faît Accompli" – 4:10
2. "Arms Out" – 4:45
3. "Sigh" – 3:49

=== MC ===
1. "Faît Accompli" – 4:10
2. "Arms Out" – 4:45

== Track listing Faît Accompli (Extended mix) ==
=== 12" ===
1. "Faît Accompli" (extended extended extended) – 6:24
2. "Coast Is Clear" (live Manchester '91) – 4:34
3. "Die Like a Dog" (live London '91) – 4:39

== Music video ==
The music video for the song features Toni Halliday and Dean Garcia alongside Curve's touring members performing in a smoky soundstage, while a few others, including a flamenco dancer and a sheep, watch in the background. Although a few select scenes were in color, the majority of the video was filmed in black and white.

== Credits ==
- Written by Toni Halliday and Dean Garcia
- Produced by Curve and Flood
- Mixed by Alan Moulder assisted by Dick Meenhey
- Tracks 2 and 3 produced and mixed by Curve
- Design and photography by Flat Earth

== Charts ==
Chart (1992)	Peak position
Australia (ARIA)	121
UK Singles (Official Charts)	22
US Alternative Airplay (Billboard)	17
