= Cherry (EP) =

EP by Curve
- Released: 28 October 1991
- Recorded: England
- Genre: Alternative rock, shoegaze
- Length: 18:30
- Label: Anxious Records (UK); Anxious/BMG (Europe)
- Producer: Curve, Steve Osborne

Curve chronology
| Frozen (1991) | Cherry (1991) | Faît Accompli (1992) |

Professional ratings
Review scores
| Source | Rating |
|---|---|
| NME | (positive) |
| Melody Maker | (positive) |

"Cherry" (also known as "Clipped/Galaxy") is Curve's third single/EP. It was released on 28 October 1991 and it reached #36 in the UK singles chart. All four songs from the EP were included in the compilation Pubic Fruit, issued in 1992.

== Track listing ==
=== 12" & CD ===
1. "Clipped" – 4:10
2. "Die Like a Dog" – 4:37
3. "Galaxy" – 3:54
4. "Cherry" – 5:49

=== 7" & MC ===
1. "Clipped" – 4:10
2. "Galaxy" – 3:54

=== 10" ===
1. "Clipped" – 4:10
2. "Die Like a Dog" – 4:37
3. "Galaxy" – 3:54
4. "Cherry" – 5:01
5. "I Speak Your Every Word" (with JC 001) – 4:38

== Music video ==
The video for "Clipped" features the members of the band performing this song in a house.

== Credits ==
- Written by Toni Halliday and Dean Garcia
- Produced by Curve and Steve Osborne
- Recorded at Todal by Curve
- Additional recording at Eastcote Studios
- Additional engineering by Ingo Vauk
- Mixed by Alan Moulder at the Church, assisted by Dick Meenhey
- Design & photography by Flat Earth
