= Superblaster =

Single by Curve

from the album Cuckoo
- B-side: "Low and Behold", "Nothing Without Me"
- Released: 8 November 1993
- Recorded: England
- Genre: Alternative rock
- Length: 3:58 (only the title song); 11:29 (the whole CD)
- Label: Anxious Records/BMG
- Songwriters: Dean Garcia, Toni Halliday
- Producers: Curve, Flood

Curve singles chronology
"Blackerthreetracker" (1993)	"Superblaster" (1993)	"Pink Girl With the Blues" (1996)

"Superblaster" is the second single from the album Cuckoo by alternative rock band Curve. It was released on 8 November 1993. It's considered by fans as the rarest Curve release.

== Track listing ==
1. "Superblaster" – 3:58
2. "Low and Behold" – 4:18
3. "Nothing Without Me" – 3:13

== Music video ==
The video for "Superblaster" features the official and touring members of the band performing this song in colourful room, full of confetti.

== Credits ==
- Written by Toni Halliday and Dean Garcia
- #1 produced by Curve & Flood and mixed by Alan Moulder
- #2 & #3 produced by Curve and mixed by Alan Moulder
- Sleeve design by Flat Earth
- Photography by Flat Earth and Vaughan Matthews
