= Blindfold (EP) =

EP by Curve
- Released: 4 March 1991
- Recorded: England
- Genre: Alternative rock, shoegaze
- Length: 17:07
- Label: Anxious Records
- Producer: Curve, Steve Osborne

Curve chronology
Blindfold (1991)	Frozen EP (1991)

Professional ratings
Review scores
Source	Rating
NME	(positive)
Melody Maker	(positive)

"Blindfold" (also known as "Ten Little Girls") is the debut EP by English duo Curve. It was released on 4 March 1991 and it reached #68 in the UK singles chart. All four songs from the EP were included in the compilation Pubic Fruit, issued in 1992.

"Blindfold" was selected as Single of the Week by Melody Maker. It was also voted as the 5th Single of the Year by the same magazine.

== Track listing ==
All tracks are written by Dean Garcia and Toni Halliday, except where noted.

12" & CD
No.	Title	Length
1.	"Ten Little Girls" (additional lyrics by JC-001)	4:27
2.	"I Speak Your Every Word"	3:53
3.	"Blindfold"	4:28
4.	"No Escape From Heaven"	4:19
Total length:		17:07

7"
No.	Title	Length
1.	"Ten Little Girls" (additional lyrics by JC-001)	4:27
2.	"Blindfold"	4:28
Total length:		8:55

== Music video ==
The video for "Ten Little Girls" features members of the band and the rapper JC-001 performing this song in a studio. It was filmed in black and white.

== Credits ==
- Written by Toni Halliday and Dean Garcia
- Produced by Curve & Steve Osborne, except "Ten Little Girls" produced by Curve
- All tracks mixed by Alan Moulder at the Church
- Recorded at Tode by Curve
- Additional recording at Eastcote Productions
- Engineer: Ingo Vauk
- Mix Assistant: Darren Allison
- Rap written by JC 001
- Sleeve by Seddon & Curve
- Photograph by Barry Friedlander
