= Coming Up Roses (Curve song) =

Single by Curve

from the album Come Clean
- B-side: "Midnight & Royal", "Habit"
- Released: 4 May 1998
- Recorded: 1997
- Genre: Alternative rock, trip hop
- Length: 3:51 (only the title song); 20:57 (the whole CD 1)
- Label: Estupendo/Universal Music International
- Songwriters: Dean Garcia, Toni Halliday
- Producers: Steve Osborne, Curve

Curve singles chronology
"Chinese Burn" (1997)	"Coming Up Roses" (1998)	"Perish" (2002)

Professional ratings
Review scores
Source	Rating
Melody Maker	(negative)
NME	(negative)

"Coming Up Roses" is the second single from the third studio album Come Clean by alternative rock band Curve. It was released on 4 May 1998 and it reached #51 in the UK singles chart.

The Kevin Shields mix of this song was included on the disc 2 of Curve's compilation The Way of Curve.

== Track listing ==
=== CD 1 ===
1. "Coming Up Roses" (Jeremy Wheatley's Radio mix) – 3:51
2. "Coming Up Roses" (Talvin Singh remix) – 8:09
3. "Midnight & Royal" – 4:45
4. "Habit" – 4:12

=== CD 2 ===
1. "Coming Up Roses" (Jeremy Wheatley's Full mix) – 4:00
2. "Coming Up Roses" (Blue Amazon's Crystaline Vocal mix) – 6:01
3. "Coming Up Roses" (Red Star Yellow Star mix) – 9:06
4. "Coming Up Roses" (Danny Saber Full Length mix) – 5:21
5. "Coming Up Roses" (Kevin Shields mix) – 6:20

=== 12" ===
1. "Coming Up Roses" (Blue Amazon's Crystaline Vocal mix) – 6:01
2. "Coming Up Roses" (Blue Amazon's Quad Club mix) – 10:45
3. "Coming Up Roses" (Jeremy Wheatley's Full mix) – 4:00
4. "Coming Up Roses" (Talvin Singh remix) – 8:09

== Credits ==
- Written by Toni Halliday and Dean Garcia
- Produced by Steve Osborne and Curve, engineered and mixed by Alan Moulder (except "Midnight & Royal" and "Habit" produced and mixed by Curve at Todal)
