= Frozen (EP) =

EP by Curve
- Released: 13 May 1991
- Recorded: England
- Genre: Alternative rock, shoegaze
- Length: 16:22
- Label: Anxious Records (UK); Anxious/Rebel (SPV) (Europe); Charisma (US)
- Producer: Curve, Steve Osborne

Curve chronology
Blindfold (1991)	Frozen (1991)	Cherry (1991)

Professional ratings
Review scores
Source	Rating
NME	(positive)
Melody Maker	(positive)

"Frozen" (also known as "Coast Is Clear") is Curve's second single/EP. It was released on 13 May 1991 and it reached #34 in the UK singles chart. All four songs from the EP were included in the compilation Pubic Fruit, issued in 1992.

"Frozen" was selected as Single of the Week by both Melody Maker and NME.

== Track listing ==
=== 12" & CD ===
1. "Coast Is Clear" – 4:00
2. "The Colour Hurts" – 4:34
3. "Frozen" – 3:58
4. "Zoo" – 3:50

=== 7" & MC ===
1. "Coast Is Clear" – 4:00
2. "Frozen" – 3:58

== Music video ==
The video for "Coast Is Clear" features the official members of the band and the touring members performing this song. It was filmed in black and white. Some scenes have applied a blue filter.

== Credits ==
- Written by Toni Halliday and Dean Garcia
- Recorded at TODE by Curve
- Produced by Curve and Steve Osborne
- Mixed by Alan Moulder at Swanyard
- Additional Recording at Eastcote Studios
- Engineer: Ingo Vauk
- Mix Assistant: Ronan Tal
- Painting: J.P. Wombbaby
- Sleeve Design: Darda

== Charts ==
Chart (1991–92)	Peak position
UK Singles (OCC)	34
US Alternative Airplay (Billboard)	12
