= Blackerthreetracker =

Single by Curve

from the album Cuckoo
- Released: 23 August 1993
- Recorded: England
- Genre: Alternative rock, industrial rock
- Length: 4:19 (only the A-side); 15:10 (the whole single)
- Label: Anxious Records
- Songwriters: Dean Garcia, Toni Halliday
- Producers: Curve, Flood

Curve singles chronology
"Horror Head" (1992)	"Blackerthreetracker" (1993)	"Superblaster" (1993)

"Blackerthreetracker" is a single by alternative rock band Curve, preceding the issue of their second studio album, Cuckoo. It was released on 23 August 1993 and it reached #39 in the UK singles chart. It includes the song "Missing Link", the first track from Cuckoo.

"Blackerthreetracker" was released at the same time with the remix CD, "Blackerthreetrackertwo".

Blackerthreetrackertwo cover

== Track listing ==
=== Blackerthreetracker ===
- 12", CD, MC
1. "Missing Link" – 4:19
2. "On the Wheel" – 6:01
3. "Triumph" – 4:50

=== Blackerthreetrackertwo ===
- CD
1. "Missing Link" (Screaming Bird mix) – 6:22
2. "Rising" (Headspace mix) – 9:21
3. "Half the Time" (Honey Tongue mix) – 6:18

== Music video ==
A music video was made for "Missing Link" which featured the official and touring members of the band performing this song in a rainy wasteland. The video was shown in the Beavis and Butt-head episode "Water Safety", where the duo comments that the video was "pretty cool".

== Credits ==
- Written by Toni Halliday and Dean Garcia
- "Missing Link" produced by Curve & Flood and mixed by Mark 'Spike' Stent for SSO
- Tracks 2 & 3 produced and mixed by Curve,
- Sleeve designed by Flat Earth
- Photography by Flat Earth and Vaughan Matthews
