= Horror Head =

EP by Curve
- Released: 6 July 1992
- Genre: Alternative rock; shoegaze
- Length: 15:53
- Label: Anxious
- Producer: Curve; Flood

Curve chronology
Faît Accompli (1992)	Horror Head (1992)	Blackerthreetracker (1993)

Professional ratings
Review scores
Source	Rating
NME	(positive)

Horror Head is an EP by the alternative rock band Curve. It was released on 6 July 1992 and reached number 31 on the UK singles chart. The title track is a remixed version of a song from the band's debut studio album Doppelgänger.

== Track listing ==
=== 12" and CD ===
1. "Horror Head" (remix) – 3:40
2. "Falling Free" – 4:22
3. "Mission From God" – 4:07
4. "Today Is Not the Day" – 3:44

=== MC ===
1. "Horror Head" (remix) – 3:40
2. "Mission From God" – 4:07

== Music video ==
The video for "Horror Head" features members of the band performing this song. It is full of fast colour changes. Toni Halliday is showing some Indian symbols in this clip and is swimming in the blurred water.

== Credits ==
- Written by Toni Halliday and Dean Garcia
- "Horror Head" (remix) produced by Curve and Flood and remixed by Alan Moulder at the Church
- Tracks 2, 3, 4 produced by Curve and mixed by Alan Moulder at Todal
- Design and photography: Flat Earth

== Charts ==
Chart (1992)	Peak position
UK Singles (OCC)	31
US Alternative Airplay (Billboard)	23
