= Pink Girl with the Blues =

"Pink Girl With the Blues"

Single by Curve
- B-side: "Recovery", "Black Delilah"
- Released: 2 September 1996
- Recorded: England
- Genre: Alternative rock
- Length: 4:17 (only the title song); 13:45 (the whole single)
- Label: FatLip
- Songwriters: Dean Garcia, Toni Halliday
- Producer: Curve

Curve singles chronology
"Superblaster" (1993)	"Pink Girl With the Blues" (1996)	"Chinese Burn" (1997)

Professional ratings
Review scores
Source	Rating
Allmusic	4/5 stars

"Pink Girl With the Blues" is a single by alternative rock band Curve released on 2 September 1996. It was the first release after few years of hiatus and it reached #97 on UK singles chart. The second track, "Recovery", will be later included on their third studio album, Come Clean. All songs were mixed by Alan Moulder.

== Track listing ==
=== CD ===
1. "Pink Girl With the Blues" – 4:17
2. "Recovery" – 4:34
3. "Black Delilah" – 4:54

=== 7" ===
1. "Pink Girl With the Blues" – 4:17
2. "Recovery" – 4:34

== Credits ==
- Written by Toni Halliday and Dean Garcia
- All tracks produced by Dean Garcia and Toni Halliday ad mixed by Alan Moulder
- Photography by Trevor Ray Hart
- Design by Alexander Hutchinson
