= Pubic Fruit =

Compilation album by Curve
- Released: 17 November 1992
- Studio: Todal (London); Eastcote (London)
- Genre: Shoegaze
- Length: 58:40
- Label: Anxious; Charisma
- Producer: Curve; Steve Osborne; Flood

Curve chronology
Doppelgänger (1992)	Pubic Fruit (1992)	Radio Sessions (1993)

Pubic Fruit is a compilation album by English alternative rock band Curve. It was released exclusively in the United States on 17 November 1992 by Anxious Records and Charisma Records. The album compiles the band's first three EPs, as well as the extended version of their song "Faît Accompli".

== Release ==
Curve released three critically acclaimed EPs – Blindfold, Frozen and Cherry – in the United Kingdom in 1991. None of the tracks from these EPs were included on the band's 1992 debut studio album Doppelgänger, with the exception of "Clipped", which was added to the American pressing of the album. Released exclusively in the United States by Anxious Records and Charisma Records on 17 November 1992, after Doppelgänger, Pubic Fruit compiles the three EPs, which had only been issued in the UK. The compilation also includes the extended version of the Doppelgänger track "Faît Accompli" (first released as a single in 1992), which likewise had not yet been commercially released in the US.

== Critical reception ==
Professional ratings
Review scores
Source	Rating
AllMusic	4/5 stars
The Encyclopedia of Popular Music	4/5 stars

In 2016, Pitchfork ranked Pubic Fruit at number 19 on its list of the 50 best shoegaze albums of all time.

== Track listing ==
All tracks are written by Dean Garcia and Toni Halliday, except where noted.

No.	Title	Original release	Length
1.	"Ten Little Girls" (additional lyrics by JC-001)	Blindfold	4:27
2.	"I Speak Your Every Word"	Blindfold	3:54
3.	"Blindfold"	Blindfold	4:31
4.	"No Escape from Heaven"	Blindfold	4:20
5.	"Coast Is Clear"	Frozen	4:01
6.	"The Colour Hurts"	Frozen	4:34
7.	"Frozen"	Frozen	3:59
8.	"Zoo"	Frozen	3:51
9.	"Clipped"	Cherry	4:11
10.	"Die Like a Dog"	Cherry	4:41
11.	"Galaxy"	Cherry	3:56
12.	"Cherry"	Cherry	5:49
13.	"Faît Accompli (Extended Extended Extended)"	"Faît Accompli" single	6:26
Total length:			58:40

== Personnel ==
Credits are adapted from the album's liner notes.

Curve

- Dean Garcia
- Toni Halliday

Production

- Darren Allison – mixing (assistant)
- Curve – production
- Flood – production
- Dick Meaney – mixing (assistant)
- Alan Moulder – mixing
- Steve Osborne – production
- Ronan Tal – mixing (assistant)
- Ingo Vauk – engineering

Design

- Flat Earth – design, photography
- Barry Freidlander – photography
- Barry Maguire – photography
- Clare Muller – photography
- Dave Stewart – photography
- J. P. Wombbaby – photography
