= Perish (song) =

Single by Curve

from the album Gift
- Released: 28 October 2002
- Recorded: England
- Genre: Alternative rock
- Length: 3:54 (only the title song); 13:28 (the whole single)
- Label: FatLip/Universal International Music/Artful
- Songwriters: Dean Garcia, Toni Halliday
- Producer: Curve

Curve singles chronology
"Coming Up Roses" (1998)	"Perish" (2002)	"Want More Need Less" (2003)

Professional ratings
Review scores
Source	Rating
Meltdown Magazine	3.5/5 stars

"Perish" is the first single from the fourth studio album Gift by alternative rock band Curve. It was released on 28 October 2002 only on CD format and it reached #168 in the UK singles chart.

This single includes a radio version of the "Perish", the album track "Want More Need Less" from Gift and a reworked version of "Recovery" from Pink Girl With the Blues/Come Clean.

== Track listing ==
1. "Perish" – 3:54
2. "Want More Need Less" – 4:35
3. "Recovery" – 4:59

== Credits ==
- Written by Toni Halliday and Dean Garcia
- Toni Halliday: words, vocals and guitar noise
- Dean Garcia: bass, guitar, programming and noise
- Produced, engineered, recorded by Curve and Ben Grosse at Todal Studios
- Mixed by Ben Grosse at The Mix Room Los Angeles
- Featuring Kevin Shields: more guitar on tracks 1 & 2
- Monti: more drums on tracks 1 & 2
- Mastered by Kevin Metcallfe at Soundmasters London
- Design: Curve and Paul Agar
