= Want More Need Less =

Single by Curve

from the album Gift
- Released: 3 February 2003
- Recorded: England
- Genre: Alternative rock
- Length: 3:59 (only the title song); 13:22 (the whole single)
- Label: Artful/Universal International/Hoop Culture/Westlink Multimedia/MGM (AUS)
- Songwriter(s): Dean Garcia, Toni Halliday
- Producer(s): Curve, Ben Grosse

Curve singles chronology
"'Perish'" (2002)	"Want More Need Less" (2003)

"Want More Need Less" is the second single from the fourth studio album Gift by alternative rock band Curve. It was released on 3 February 2003 only on CD format and only in Australia.

This single includes three songs from Gift.

== Track listing ==
1. "Want More Need Less" – 3:59
2. "My Tiled White Floor" – 5:16
3. "Bleeding Heart" – 4:07

== Credits ==
- Written by Toni Halliday and Dean Garcia
- Produced, engineered and recorded at Todal Studios by Curve and Ben Grosse at Todal
- Mixed by Ben Grosse at The Mix Room Los Angeles
- Toni Halliday: words, vocals and guitar
- Dean Garcia: bass, guitar, programming and noise
- Kevin Shields: more guitar track 1
- Alan Moulder: more guitar track 3
- Flood: bleeps track 2
- Monti: more drums tracks 1 & 3
- Rob Holliday: more guitar tracks 2 & 3
- Designed by Curve and Paul Agar
- Saucer scan: Wombbaby
