= Doppelgänger (Curve album) =

Studio album by Curve
- Released: 9 March 1992
- Recorded: July–October 1991
- Studio: Todal (London); Eastcote (London)
- Genre: Shoegaze
- Length: 42:27
- Label: Anxious; Charisma
- Producer: Curve; Flood

Curve chronology
Doppelgänger (1992)	Pubic Fruit (1992)

Singles from Doppelgänger
- 1. "Faît Accompli" Released: 24 February 1992; 2. "Horror Head" Released: 6 July 1992

Doppelgänger is the debut studio album by English alternative rock band Curve. It was released on 9 March 1992 in the United Kingdom by Anxious Records, and on the following day in the United States by Anxious and Charisma Records.

A continuation of the musical idiom established by the group on its three earlier EPs, Doppelgänger combines elements of dance music and alternative rock with the reverb-laden and distortion-heavy stylings of shoegaze.

== Critical reception ==
Professional ratings
Review scores
Source	Rating
AllMusic	4.5/5 stars
Entertainment Weekly	C
NME	7/10
The Philadelphia Inquirer	3.5/4 stars
Q	4/5 stars
Rolling Stone	4/5 stars
Select	2/5
Vox	6/10

J. D. Considine of Musician said: "Curve's thick, psychedelic throb crosses the electrobeat aggression of Front 242 with the blurred guitar drone of Lush, an approach that allows the band the advantages of both styles without becoming openly in thrall to either. And it sounds just fine, in part because of the care with which Dean Garcia tends his soundscapes, and mostly because of the way Toni Halliday's cool, throaty vocals snake melody through the thick-swirling grooves. A singularly entrancing album."

In Q, David Cavanagh wrote:

Every song here is swimming in guitars – mashed, chewed, flanged, compressed, squally, howling, whatever. But no matter how cacophonous the music gets (and 'Ice That Melts the Tips' sounds as though three guitars are beating the crap out of a fourth), Halliday's voice is terrifically sensual and seductive, sounding just the pretty side of evil. As keen subscribers to the interpret-how-thou-wilt school of lyric writing, Curve's possible grievances are most addressed using drums and guitars: 'Faît Accompli', the new single, is a singalonga-schizoid affair, tuneful but menacing; 'Think and Act' has a touch of 'Where the Streets Have No Name' guitars, but it's way tougher. Variations in mood are slight – a little slowing down for 'Lillies Dying'; some Indian sampling for 'Horror Head' – until the final song, a cold, grey ballad called 'Sandpit' that only adds to Doppelgänger's shopping list of unexplained treats.

In its end-of-year round-up issue, Q stated that "Doppelgänger delighted with its thrashy guitar sounds, bone-rattling drum tattoos and cool, poised vocal performances."

== Legacy ==
Q featured Doppelgänger in a 1999 list of the best "gothic" albums: "A thundering, subtly melodic debut drowned out the critics and, though it was all over two years later, the multimillion-selling Garbage had certainly learned something." In 2013, the record was included in PopMatters' list of 10 essential shoegaze albums other than My Bloody Valentine's Loveless. In 2016, Pitchfork ranked Doppelgänger at number 40 on its list of the 50 best shoegaze albums of all time; in an accompanying essay, Stephen Thomas Erlewine wrote:

Curve's great innovation was marrying densely cloistered electronic rhythms with the approaching onslaught of noise-pop. Prior to their 1992 debut Doppelgänger, such a blend didn't exist, but Curve pioneered the sound that eventually became widespread; their own doppelgänger, Garbage, made a mint with this fusion just a few years later. Curve have stronger ties to shoegaze than Garbage, however, not just because of their timing but also their articulation: Vocalist Toni Halliday and multi-instrumentalist Dean Garcia favor fuzziness in sound and style, letting aesthetics bleed together, preferring sensation over sculpted song. On Doppelgänger, the duo demonstrates a strong melodic sense that's as apparent in the riffs and rhythms as the verses themselves. Halliday also remains unique in shoegaze: She's a singer who pushes herself to the forefront, stealing attention from the tidal waves of noise and distortion that surround her.

== Track listing ==
All tracks are written by Dean Garcia and Toni Halliday

UK edition
No.	Title	Length
1.	"Already Yours"	3:56
2.	"Horror Head"	3:41
3.	"Wish You Dead"	3:31
4.	"Doppelgänger"	4:30
5.	"Lillies Dying"	4:24
6.	"Ice That Melts the Tips"	4:31
7.	"Split into Fractions"	4:33
8.	"Think and Act"	5:15
9.	"Faît Accompli"	4:39
10.	"Sandpit"	3:27
Total length:		42:27

US edition bonus track
No.	Title	Length
11.	"Clipped"	3:51
Total length:		46:18

25th Anniversary Expanded Edition - Disc One
No.	Title	Length
11.	"Faît Accompli (Single Version)"	4:15
12.	"Arms Out"	4:51
13.	"Sigh"	3:53
14.	"Faît Accompli (ExtendedExtendedExtended)"	6:29
15.	"Horror Head (Single Remix)"	3:45
16.	"Falling Free"	4:27
17.	"Mission From God"	4:10
18.	"Today Is Not The Day"	3:45
Total length:		78:02

25th Anniversary Expanded Edition - Disc Two
No.	Title	Length
1.	"Ten Little Girls"	4:30
2.	"I Speak Your Every Word"	3:58
3.	"Blindfold"	4:31
4.	"No Escape From Heaven"	4:22
5.	"Coast Is Clear"	4:04
6.	"The Colour Hurts"	4:39
7.	"Frozen"	4:02
8.	"Zoo"	3:53
9.	"Clipped"	4:15
10.	"Die Like a Dog"	4:42
11.	"Galaxy"	3:58
12.	"Cherry"	5:51
13.	"Falling Free (Aphex Twin Remix)"	7:42
14.	"Coast Is Clear (Live Manchester '91)"	4:34
15.	"Die Like A Dog (Live London '91)"	4:42
16.	"I Feel Love"	4:35
Total length:		74:18

== Personnel ==
Credits are adapted from the album's liner notes.

Curve

- Dean Garcia – bass, guitar, keyboards, drum programming
- Toni Halliday – vocals

Additional musicians

- Alex Mitchell – guitar
- Steve Monti – drums
- Alan Moulder – guitar
- Debbie Smith – guitar

Production

- Darren Allison – mixing (assistant)
- Denis Blackham – mastering
- Curve – production, engineering
- Flood – production, engineering
- Alan Moulder – mixing
- Charles "Giles" Steel – engineering (assistant)
- Ingo Vauk – engineering

Design

- Flat Earth – design, photography

== Charts ==
Chart (1992)	Peak position
Australian Albums (ARIA)	136
European Top 100 Albums (Music & Media)	35
UK Albums (OCC)	11
UK Independent Albums (OCC)	2
US Heatseekers Albums (Billboard)	18
