= Rare and Unreleased (Curve album) =

Compilation album by Curve
- Released: 7 October 2010
- Recorded: 1991–2004
- Genres: Alternative rock, electronic
- Label: Self-released
- Producer: Curve with various others

Curve chronology
The Way of Curve (2004)	Rare and Unreleased (2010)

Rare and Unreleased is a compilation album by Curve, self-released only on their Bandcamp page, as digital download.

The compilation consists of 39 tracks: various B-sides (previously released), remixes, covers, one-off songs and some unreleased songs (that can't be found anywhere else).

== Track listing ==
1. "Arms Out" – 04:46
2. "Black Delilah" – 04:55
3. "Cherry" – 05:50
4. "Chinese Burn" (Lunatic Calm mix) – 07:24
5. "Cold Comfort" – 04:35
6. "Coming Up Roses" (Red Star Yellow Star mix) – 09:09
7. "Coming Up Roses" (Kevin Shields mix) – 06:14
8. "Coming Up Roses" (Talvin Singh mix) – 08:11
9. "Down in the Park" – 05:32 (Tubeway Army remix)
10. "Falling Free" (Aphex Twin remix) – 07:40
11. "Get Me Through This" – 05:32
12. "Gift" (remix) – 05:00
13. "Habit" – 04:13
14. "Hell Above Water" (remix) – 04:12
15. "I Feel Love" – 04:35
16. "Killer Baby" – 03:43
17. "Let It Go" – 04:26
18. "Low and Behold" – 04:14
19. "Midnight and Royal" – 04:47
20. "Mission From God" – 04:07
21. "My Brain Cuckoo" (remix) – 05:25
22. "Overground" – 03:42
23. "Perish" (XFM mix) – 06:44
24. "Pink Girl With the Blues" – 04:23
25. "Recovery" (Ambient mix) – 04:59
26. "Sigh" – 03:49
27. "Some Good Some Bad" – 03:22
28. "Star" (Alternative mix) – 06:45
29. "Superblaster" (Ambient mix) – 04:44
30. "Test" – 05:59
31. "Today Is Not the Day" – 03:38
32. "Triumph" – 04:49
33. "Turnaround" – 03:27
34. "Unreadable Communication AM" – 04:39
35. "Want More Need Less" (XFM mix) – 04:45
36. "Weekend" – 04:20
37. "What a Waste" (featuring Ian Dury) – 04:58
38. "Worst Mistake" (Trash mix) – 05:03
39. "Missing Link" (Screaming Bird mix) – 06:26

== Personnel ==
- Vocals and lyrics: Toni Halliday
- Bass, drums, guitar and programming: Dean Garcia
- Produced, recorded and engineered: Dean Garcia and Toni Halliday at Todal
- Additional production: Flood, Steve Osborne, Ben Grosse, Talvin Singh, Kevin Shields, Aphex Twin, Mista, Lunatic Calm, Instruction Shuttle
- Mixed: Alan Moulder, Ben Grosse, Dean Garcia, Toni Halliday, Talvin Singh, Kevin Shields, Aphex Twin, Mista, Lunatic Calm, Todd Astromass

Tracks 5, 11, 12, 14, 16 (this version), 17, 21 to 23, 25, 27, 29, 34 to 36, 38 previously unreleased.

Tracks 1, 2, 4 to 9, 10 (original sessions), 11, 13, 14, 16 to 20, 21 (original track), 22 to 33, 34 (original track), 35 to 38 produced, recorded and engineered at Todal. Tracks 13, 19, 22, 31 to 33 mixed at Todal.

Track 1 & 26: Taken from the single "Faît Accompli". Track 1 taken from album Doppelgänger. Track 2 & 24: Taken from Pink Girl With The Blues. Track 3: Recorded at Todal, Eastcote and The Church. Mixed at The Church. Taken from the Cherry. Track 4: Taken from the Chinese Burn. Track 6 & 7: Taken from the single "Coming Up Roses". Track 6 remixed at The ELab Track 8, 13 & 19: Taken from the single "Coming Up Roses". Track 9 is actually a remix of Gary Numan's "Down in the Park", taken from the album Gary Numan - Hybrid. Track 10: Taken from the single "Horror Head". [Only the original not remixed track can be found on that single. The remixed version appeared on the limited edition promo 12" "Falling Free" (Remix). Track 12: Instrumental Version. Remixed at The ELab. Track 15: Produced, recorded, engineered and mixed at The Church Studios. [Taken from Various - Ruby Trax - The NME's Roaring Forty]. Track 16: Additional production, engineering and recording at Bath Moles. Track 17: Mixed at The Mix Room in LA. [Gift outtake] Track 18: Taken from the single EP Superblaster. Track 20 & 31: Taken from the single EP Horror Head. Track 28 & 33: Taken from Open Day at the Hate Fest. Track 30: Mixed at the ELAb. Featured on Various - Volume 17 - Fifth Birthday Bumper Bonanza!. Track 32: Taken from Blackerthreetracker. Track 34: Performed live at the Electric Music Festival on Randall's Island in NYC 10/12/02. Track 37: Taken from the Various - Peace Together compilation. Track 38: Made for the PS2 game Frequency. Track 39: Recorded At Todal 1993. Taken from Blackerthreetrackertwo.
