= Cuckoo (album) =

Studio album by Curve
- Released: 13 September 1993
- Recorded: December 1992 – March 1993
- Studio: Todal (London)
- Genre: Shoegaze
- Length: 45:46
- Label: Anxious; Charisma
- Producer: Curve; Flood; Steve Osborne

Curve chronology
Radio Sessions (1993)	Cuckoo (1993)	Come Clean (1998)

Singles from Cuckoo
- 1. "Blackerthreetracker" Released: 23 August 1993; 2. "Superblaster" Released: 8 November 1993

Professional ratings
Review scores
Source	Rating
AllMusic	4/5 stars
Chicago Tribune	3/4 stars
Entertainment Weekly	B+
Los Angeles Times	3/4 stars
NME	5/10
The Philadelphia Inquirer	3/4 stars
Q	3/5 stars
Select	5/5
Vox	6/10

Cuckoo is the second studio album to be released by the British alternative rock band Curve. It was released on 13 September 1993 and was issued by Anxious Records and Charisma Records. It was less commercially successful than the band's previous releases.

== Release ==
Cuckoo was released in the United Kingdom on 13 September 1993 by Anxious Records, and in the United States on 21 September 1993 by Anxious and Charisma Records. Two singles were issued from the album: "Blackerthreetracker" (which featured the Cuckoo song "Missing Link" as its lead track) on 23 August 1993, and "Superblaster" on 8 November 1993. In the UK, Cuckoo underperformed commercially compared to previous Curve releases, peaking at number 23 on the UK Albums Chart. Several months after the album's release, Curve disbanded, though they would reform in 1996.

In the August 1996 issue of Select magazine, Curve frontwoman Toni Halliday said: "I still think our second album was our best. It got to the point where Dean didn't want to tour. We did reach that point of hedonistic head-fuckery, glugging JD, hollering 'Where's the schnozz?' You finally get that out of your system and think, 'This is sad.' We couldn't have gone on like that."

== Track listing ==
All tracks are written by Dean Garcia and Toni Halliday

No.	Title	Producer(s)	Length
1.	"Missing Link"	Curve; Flood	4:59
2.	"Crystal"	Curve; Flood	4:02
3.	"Men Are from Mars, Women Are from Venus"	Curve; Flood	4:36
4.	"All of One"	Curve; Flood	4:19
5.	"Unreadable Communication"	Curve; Steve Osborne	5:51
6.	"Turkey Crossing"	Curve; Osborne	4:53
7.	"Superblaster"	Curve; Flood	4:01
8.	"Left of Mother"	Curve; Flood	4:10
9.	"Sweetest Pie"	Curve; Flood	3:59
10.	"Cuckoo"	Curve; Osborne	4:56
Total length:			45:46

25th Anniversary Expanded Edition - Disc Two
No.	Title	Producer(s)	Length
1.	"Missing Link (Single Mix)"	Curve; Flood	4:23
2.	"On The Wheel"	Curve; Flood	6:04
3.	"Triumph"	Curve; Flood	4:54
4.	"Superblaster (Single Mix)"	Curve; Flood	4:02
5.	"Low And Behold"	Curve; Flood	4:20
6.	"Nothing Without Me"	Curve; Osborne	3:16
7.	"Missing Link (Screaming Bird Mix)"	Curve; Flood; Trent Reznor	6:28
8.	"Rising (Headspace Mix)"	Curve; Flood; The Future Sound Of London	9:25
9.	"Half The Time (Honey Tongue Mix)"	Curve; Flood; The Drum Club	6:20
10.	"Rising (Original Mix)"	Curve; Flood	4:15
11.	"Half The Time (Original Mix)"	Curve; Flood	4:05
Total length:			57:32

== Personnel ==
Credits are adapted from the album's liner notes.

Curve

- Dean Garcia – bass, guitar, drum programming
- Toni Halliday – vocals

Additional musicians

- Flood – electronics
- Sally Herbert – violin on "Superblaster" and "Left of Mother"
- Alex Mitchell – guitar
- Steve Monti – drums on "Crystal", "Superblaster" and "Sweetest Pie"
- Alan Moulder – guitar
- Steve Osborne – guitar
- Debbie Smith – guitar

Production

- Darren Allison – mixing (assistant)
- Curve – production
- Flood – production
- Alan Moulder – mixing
- Steve Osborne – production on "Unreadable Communication", "Turkey Crossing" and "Cuckoo"

Design

- Andrew Catlin – band photography
- Flat Earth – sleeve design, cover photography
- Vaughan Matthews – cover photography

== Charts ==
Chart (1993)	Peak position
European Top 100 Albums (Music & Media)	77
UK Albums (OCC)	23
UK Independent Albums (OCC)	2
US Heatseekers Albums (Billboard)	18
