= Rare and Unreleased =

Rare and Unreleased may refer to:

- Rare and Unreleased (Burning Spear album)
- Rare and Unreleased (Curve album)
