= Chinese Burn (song) =

Single by Curve

from the album Come Clean
- Released: 18 November 1997 (US); 1 December 1997 (UK)
- Recorded: 1997
- Genre: Alternative rock, big beat, electronica
- Length: 3:57 (only the title song); 43:09 (the whole single, UK version); 48:30 (the whole single, US version)
- Label: Estupendo/Universal (UK & US), MFS (GER), Estupendo/Universal Music Australia/BMG Music Australia (AUS)
- Songwriters: Dean Garcia, Toni Halliday
- Producers: Steve Osborne, Curve

Curve singles chronology
| "Pink Girl With the Blues" (1996) | "Chinese Burn" (1997) | "Coming Up Roses" (1998) |

Professional ratings
Review scores
| Source | Rating |
|---|---|
| Allmusic | 3/5 stars |
| NME | (positive) |

"Chinese Burn" is a 1997 song by the alternative rock band Curve. It was the first single from their third studio album Come Clean, and was released on 18 November 1997 in the US and on 1 December 1997 in the UK.

This song is featured in the 1999 Buffy the Vampire Slayer episode, "Bad Girls", the La Femme Nikita TV show soundtrack, as well as the first theatrical trailer for the 2000 film X-Men and the trailer for the 2004 film Torque. It also featured in the wrecking yard fight scene of the 2006 film Stormbreaker. A portion of the Lunatic Calm remix was included as a music track in the game FIFA 2001, as well as in a sizzle reel for the 2002 film Spider-Man.

In August 2020, Bandcamp premiered a collection of mixes of "Chinese Burn" that were originally recorded to DAT. These were mostly monitor mixes and instrumentals of the tracks "Chinese Burn", "Coming Up Roses", "Killer Baby" and "Dirty High". They were released under the title "Chinese Burn EP - Bootleg Series 2". According to band member Dean Garcia, "These are the original recordings and mixes from the 4 track Chinese Burn EP that we recorded and mixed with Steve at Moles studios in Bath just before we started the Come Clean album... These versions are all un-mastered (ie straight off the board) mixes we made at Moles. All of the tracks were subsequently remixed-reproduced/revisited and mastered for the official album release version on Come Clean by Alan, Flood and Tim Simenon to name a few. These raw off the board versions made by Steve have always been my (Dean) faves."

== Track listing ==
=== UK version ===
1. "Chinese Burn" (Steve Osborne mix) – 3:57
2. "Chinese Burn" (Paul Van Dyk Forbidden City remix) – 10:38
3. "Chinese Burn" (Lunatic Calm remix) – 7:35
4. "Chinese Burn" (Witchman's Eye of the Storm remix) – 6:27
5. "Chinese Burn" (Headcase Medipac remix) – 6:18
6. "Robbing Charity" – 5:58
7. "Come Clean" – 2:16

=== US version ===
1. "Chinese Burn" (Flood mix) – 4:26
2. "Chinese Burn" (Paul Van Dyk Forbidden City remix) – 10:38
3. "Chinese Burn" (Lunatic Calm remix) – 7:35
4. "Chinese Burn" (Headcase Medipac remix) – 6:18
5. "Chinese Burn" (Witchman's Eye of the Storm remix) – 6:27
6. "Chinese Burn" (Steve Osborne mix) – 4:52
7. "Robbing Charity" – 5:58
8. "Come Clean" – 2:16

=== Bootleg Series 2 ===
1. "Chinese Burn" (Moles M1) – 4:49
2. "Chinese Burn" (Moles M2) – 4:52
3. "Chinese Burn" (Moles Instrumental) – 4:49
4. "Coming Up Roses" (Moles M1) – 5:33
5. "Coming Up Roses" (Moles M2) – 4:36
6. "Coming Up Roses" (Moles Instrumental) – 5:41
7. "Killer Baby" (Moles Master) – 3:39
8. "Killer Baby" (Unedited Moles Instrumental) – 4:07
9. "Dirty High" (Moles Master) – 5:34

== Credits ==
- Written by Toni Halliday and Dean Garcia
- Produced by Steve Osborne and Curve and mixed by Steve Osborne (except "Chinese Burn" (Flood mix) produced by Tim Simenon/Steve Osborne/Curve and mixed by Flood/Tim Simenon)
- "Robbing Charity" and "Come Clean" produced and mixed by Curve
