= MotoGP 10/11 =

2011 video game

- Developer: Monumental Games
- Publisher: Capcom
- Series: MotoGP
- Platforms: PlayStation 3, Xbox 360
- Release: March 15, 2011
- Genres: Racing, sports
- Modes: Single-player, multiplayer

MotoGP 10/11 is a racing game based on the 2010 MotoGP season and the 2011 MotoGP season. The game was developed by Monumental Games. It was released by Capcom on March 15, 2011, for the PlayStation 3 and Xbox 360 and is follow up to MotoGP 09/10. It is the fourth and final MotoGP game published by Capcom, and the second and final MotoGP game developed by Monumental Games after MotoGP 09/10.
