= Curve (band) =

English alternative rock band

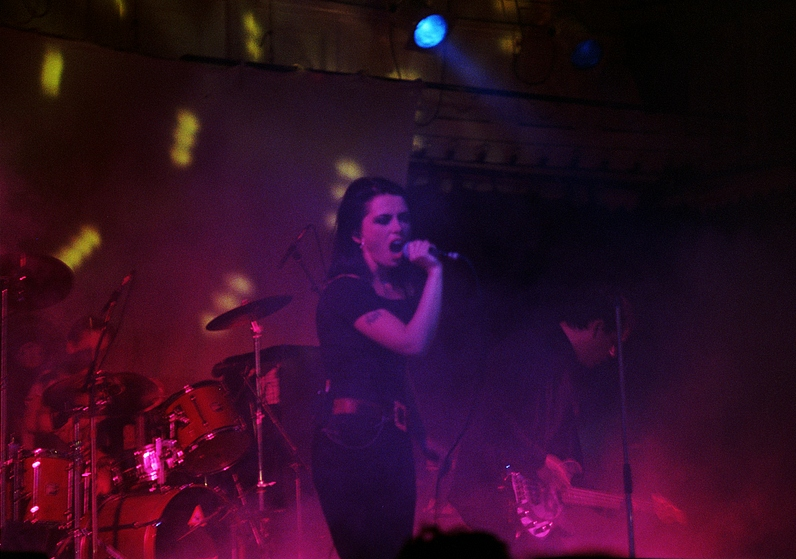
- Curve live at Paradiso, Amsterdam (1992)

Background information
- Origin: London, England
- Genres: Alternative rock; electronica; shoegazing; dream pop
- Years active: 1990–1994; 1996–2005
- Labels: Anxious, Charisma, FatLip, Universal
- Past members: Toni Halliday; Dean Garcia; Debbie Smith; Alex Mitchell; Steve Monti
- Website: curve.co.uk

Curve were an English alternative rock and electronic music duo from London, formed in 1990 and dissolved in 2005. The band consisted of Toni Halliday (vocals, occasionally guitar) and Dean Garcia (bass, guitar, drums, programming). Halliday wrote the lyrics of their songs and they both contributed to songwriting. Producer Alan Moulder was a prominent collaborator who helped shape their blend of heavy beats and densely layered guitar tracks set against Halliday's vocals.

Curve released five studio albums (Doppelgänger in 1992, Cuckoo in 1993, Come Clean in 1998, Gift in 2001, and The New Adventures of Curve in 2002), five compilation albums (Pubic Fruit in 1992, Radio Sessions in 1993, Open Day at the Hate Fest in 2001, The Way of Curve in 2004, and Rare and Unreleased in 2010), and a string of EPs and singles.

== History ==
Dean Garcia, half Hawaiian and half Irish, had played in some small bands when he auditioned for Eurythmics. The English-born Toni Halliday met Dave Stewart of Eurythmics after he had read a rock magazine interview with her in which she praised his pre-Eurythmics band, The Tourists. Halliday and Garcia were introduced to each other by Stewart. Garcia had played bass guitar as part of Eurythmics' live band in 1983–84 and on two of their studio albums, while Halliday was signed to Stewart's Anxious Records label as a solo artist. The pair formed an ill-fated group named State of Play in the mid-1980s before parting ways, embarking on a no less ill-fated solo career (Halliday) and further stints as a backing musician (Garcia), and then reuniting for a more long-term partnership in Curve.

As Curve, Halliday and Garcia released three acclaimed and increasingly successful EPs (Blindfold, Frozen, and Cherry) throughout 1991 on Anxious Records. They also made an impact on the UK album charts in 1992 with their debut studio album Doppelgänger. The group toured extensively during this period, with Halliday and Garcia being supported on stage by two additional guitarists (Debbie Smith, later of Echobelly, and Alex Mitchell) and a drummer (Steve Monti, formerly of Ian Dury and the Blockheads). Highlights of Curve's live career included a performance at the 1992 Glastonbury Festival, and a package tour of the United States and Canada with The Jesus and Mary Chain and Spiritualized.

In 1992, the band released the compilation album Pubic Fruit, containing their first three EPs and an extended mix of the single "Faît Accompli". Toni Halliday also featured on two songs ("Edge to Life" and "Bloodline") from Recoil's album, Bloodline. In 1993, Curve issued Radio Sessions, a compilation album of recordings made during their two sessions for John Peel's show on the UK broadcasting station BBC Radio 1.

Curve's second studio album, the harder-edged Cuckoo (1993), did not repeat the UK Top 20 success of the band's debut. That coupled with the stressfulness of the tour in support of the record, may have contributed to Halliday and Garcia's decision to disband the group in 1994. "It got to the point where Dean didn't want to tour," Halliday told Select magazine (August 1996 edition). "We did reach that point of hedonistic head-fuckery: glugging JD, hollering, 'Where's the schnozz?' You finally get that out of your system and think, 'This is sad.' We couldn't have gone on like that."

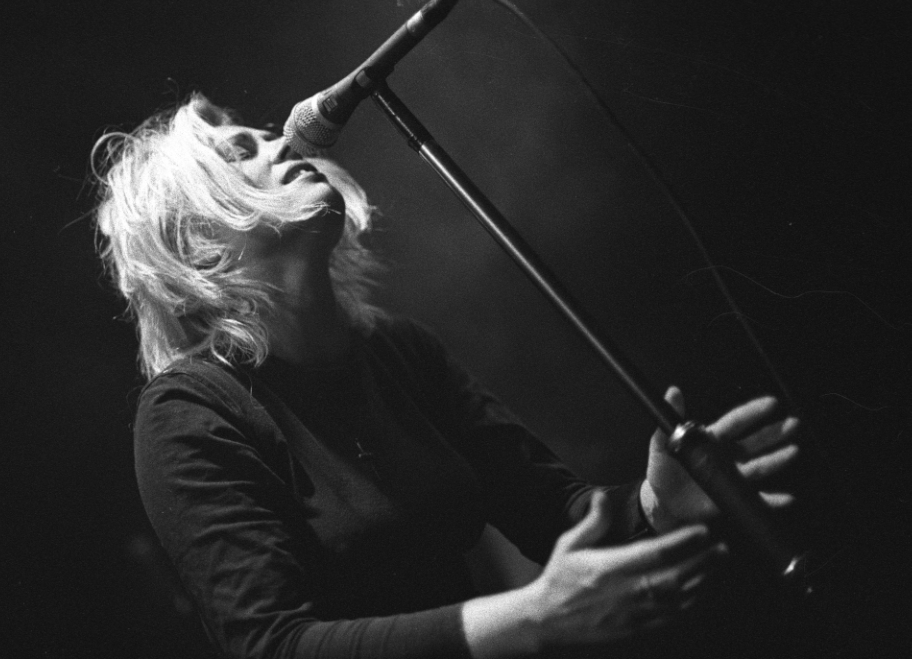
Toni Halliday live in London (1995)

During their hiatus, Halliday formed the band Scylla and Garcia began a solo project under the name Headcase. Scylla's track "Helen's Face" was featured on the Showgirls soundtrack. Halliday also collaborated with The Future Sound of London for the song "Cerebral" from Lifeforms (1994), with Freaky Chakra for the song "Budded on Earth to Bloom in Heaven" from Lowdown Motivator (1995), and with Leftfield for their number 18 UK hit "Original" from Leftism (1995). She also featured on "Original"'s music video.

Curve returned to the music business in 1996 with the EP Pink Girl With the Blues. In the same year, Curve collaborated with Paul Van Dyk by reworking the mostly instrumental song "Words" from the album Seven Ways and also adding Halliday's vocals.

In 1997, they released "Chinese Burn", the first single to be taken from their third studio album Come Clean (1998). The album is a set of songs displaying a more pronounced influence of electronic music than earlier releases. Curve continued to do small-scale live shows in and around Europe.

The follow-up to Come Clean was an internet-only compilation titled Open Day at the Hate Fest which was released in 2001. Also in the same year, Curve issued Gift, their fourth studio album. Kevin Shields of My Bloody Valentine also played guitar on the songs "Want More Need Less" and "Perish". The opening song "Hell Above Water" has gained the highest public profile as a result of its use in trailers for the 2002 film Spider-Man and the 2008 film Iron Man.

In 2002, Curve released the internet-only fifth studio album The New Adventures of Curve and various download-only tracks via their official site. In 2003, Toni Halliday collaborated with the Japanese industrial rock band Acid Android on the song "Faults" from the album with the same name.

A two-CD retrospective compilation entitled The Way of Curve summarized the group's output in 2004. The first disc included the band's singles. The second disc contained a selection of B-sides, rarities and remixes. In early 2005, Halliday announced that she had left Curve for good.

In 2010, Curve published some of their most important releases as digital downloads on their Bandcamp page, including a new compilation with 39 songs entitled Rare and Unreleased.

In 2017 Curve re-released the Doppelganger CD as a double album. This release included their first three EPs. The Cuckoo album was also re-released as a double album and included, amongst other songs, several remixes.

The band's website, maintained by Garcia, has at various times since 2004 posted updates on projects by Halliday and Garcia. It has also stated that there is unlikely to be future new Curve music.

== Post-Curve projects ==
=== Toni Halliday ===
Toni Halliday was featured on The Killers' 2006 Christmas track "A Great Big Sled". This song was later included in the 2011 compilation (RED) Christmas EP.

On 27 February 2008, she introduced on MySpace a new solo project called Chatelaine. A number of tracks could be previewed, and were credited to Halliday/Dowd/Salmon, and its MySpace blog declared that a new album was in progress. Chatelaine's debut album Take a Line for a Walk was released on 16 June 2010. It featured nine new tracks: "Broken Bones", "Oh Daddy", "Life Remains", "Stripped Out", "Shifting Sands", "Killing Feeling", "Take a Line for a Walk", "Head to Head" and "Seen and Lost".

In 2012, Halliday contributed vocals to Orbital's soundtrack for the film remake Pusher.

In 2020, Halliday released her first new collection of songs as a solo artist since her solo debut album Hearts & Handshakes. The Roll Call EP or mini album had six new songs inspired by the Berlin electronic/techno scene.

=== Dean Garcia ===
Dean Garcia is currently a member of the band SPC ECO with his daughter Rose Berlin and Joey Levenson (2007–present). In February 2009, SPC ECO released their first album, 3-D, through their website and via Collide's label Noiseplus Music. 3-D was followed by the albums You Tell Me in 2011 and Dark Notes in 2012.

Garcia is also member of the bands The Black Holes (with Jo Neale; 2007–present), The Chronologic (2006–present), Inkraktare (with Mark Wallbridge aka Vasko The Pig; 2009–present), The Secret Meeting (with kaRIN and Statik of Collide; 2007–present), KGC (with Sascha Konietzko and Lucia Cifarelli of KMFDM; 2006–present) and Morpheme (2010–present).

Garcia's newest project Morpheme is a collaboration with Perry Pelonero (Clenched Fist, Skylight, Bliss City East), and Kim Welsh (Skylight, Bliss City East). On 8 December 2010, Morpheme released their first track, "Infection" and on 5 May 2011, they released their second track, "Stratosphere", on their debut single "Infection".

Garcia released How Do You Feel?, a solo album, on 1 January 2011. It features special guests Vasko the Pig, Todd Astromass and Jeff Beck.

== Music style and influences ==
Stephen Thomas Erlewine of Allmusic described Curve's style as a "towering monolith of guitar noise, dance tracks, dark goth, and airy melodies". He also regarded the band's music as a combination of "shoegazer atmospherics and techno beats". Halliday cited Patti Smith and Nico, qualifying them as "marble giants", plus Siouxsie and the Banshees.

Toni Halliday has occasionally commented on the comparisons between Curve and Garbage, stating that she could "see bits of Garbage in what we've done, just like we see bits of Sonic Youth or the Valentines or really any band that was doing something supposedly outside the norm. [...] But eventually Garbage are a pop band, and Curve were never a pop band."

== Band members ==
=== Official members ===
- Toni Halliday – vocals, occasional guitar
- Dean Garcia – bass, guitar, drums, programming

=== Touring members ===
- Debbie Smith – guitar (from 1991 until 1994)
- Alex Mitchell – guitar (from 1991 until 1994)
- Rob Holliday – guitar (Come Clean era)
- Steve Monti – drums
- Stephen Spring – drums

== Equipment ==
- A detailed gear diagram of Dean Garcia's 2002 Curve bass rig is well-documented.
- A detailed gear diagram of Rob Holliday's 2002 Curve guitar rig is well-documented.
- On YouTube, there is a video available with Alan Moulder working in Curve's recording studio.
- An in-depth interview with Dean Garcia and Toni Halliday from 2002 that covers their live gear as well as their recording methods at their studio, Todal Studios.

== Discography ==
=== Studio albums ===
Title	Album details	Peak chart positions			
Title	Album details	UK	US Heat	AUS	EUR
Doppelgänger	Released: 9 March 1992; Labels: Anxious Records (UK), Charisma Records (US)	11	18	136	35
Cuckoo	Released: 21 September 1993; Labels: Anxious Records	23	18	—	77
Come Clean	Released: 16 February 1998; Labels: Universal Records	103	26	—	—
Gift	Released: 18 September 2001 (US), 1 July 2002 (UK), 3 February 2003 (AUS); Labels: Hip-O (US), FatLip/Artful Records (UK), Hoop Culture Records (Australia)	—	—	—	—
The New Adventures of Curve	Released: June 2002; Internet-only release	—	—	—	—

=== Compilation albums ===
Title	Album details	Peak chart positions
Title	Album details	UK
Pubic Fruit	Released: 17 November 1992; Labels: Anxious Records (UK) Charisma Records (US)	—
Radio Sessions	Released: 7 June 1993; Label: Anxious Records	72
Open Day at the Hate Fest	Released: May 2001; Internet-only release	—
The Way of Curve	Released: 17 May 2004; Labels: Anxious Records, BMG	197
Rare and Unreleased	Released: 7 October 2010; Internet-only release	—

=== EPs and singles ===
Year	Single/EP	Peak chart positions		Album
Year	Single/EP	UK	US Alt	Album
1991	"Ten Little Girls" (Note: Also known as the Blindfold EP.)	68	—	—
1991	"Coast Is Clear" (Note: Also known as the Frozen EP.)	34	12	—
1991	"Clipped" (Note: Also known as the Cherry EP.)	36	—	—
1992	"Faît Accompli"	22	17	Doppelgänger
1992	"Horror Head"	31	23	Doppelgänger
1993	"Missing Link" (Note: Also known as the Blackerthreetracker EP.)	39	—	Cuckoo
1993	"Superblaster"	—	—	Cuckoo
1996	"Pink Girl With the Blues"	91	—	—
1997	"Chinese Burn"	—	—	Come Clean
1998	"Coming Up Roses"	51	—	Come Clean
1998	"Alligators Getting Up"	—	—	Come Clean
2002	"Perish"	168	—	Gift
2003	"Want More Need Less"	—	—	Gift

=== Music videos ===
Song	Director
"Ten Little Girls"	Sophie Muller
"Blindfold"	(unknown)
"Coast Is Clear"	Sophie Muller
"Clipped"	Keir Halliday
"Faît Accompli"	Sophie Muller
"Horror Head"	Barry Maguire
"Missing Link"	Richard Heslop
"Superblaster"	Richard Heslop
"Chinese Burn"	Sophie Muller

=== One-off songs ===
Release date	Song	Compilation(s)
1992	"Faît Accompli" (live)	In a Field of Their Own: Highlights of Glastonbury 1992
November 1992	"I Feel Love": Donna Summer cover	RUBY TRAX - The NME's Roaring Forty; The Way of Curve
19 July 1993	"What a Waste" (feat. Ian Dury)	Peace Together; The Way of Curve
December 1996	"Test"	Volume 17
1997	"Nowhere"	Music From the Gregg Araki Movie Nowhere

=== Remixes ===
- Paul Van Dyk – "Words" (Curved Headcase remix)
- Tubeway Army – "Down in the Park" (Curve remix)
- The Cure – "Just Say Yes" (Curve remix)

== Song usage and guest appearances ==
- Guest producers on Gary Numan's remix album Hybrid in 2003.
- Released a track for Frequency (a music-based puzzle game on PlayStation 2) called "Worst Mistake". It is not available on CD.
- "Falling Free" remixed by Aphex Twin appeared on his 2003 compilation 26 Mixes For Cash.
- Remixed the single "Just Say Yes" for the Cure in 2001, which was released officially in 2004 on the boxset Join the Dots: B-Sides and Rarities, 1978–2001 (The Fiction Years).
- "Hell above Water" has been used in trailers for the 2002 film Spider-Man and the 2008 film Iron Man. Also it featured in the 2004 film Mindhunters, an episode for the popular crime drama CSI (Episode 207, "Caged"), and the 2008 film Lakeview Terrace. It is also featured in the games Gran Turismo 4 and MotorStorm.
- The Capcom game MotoGP 09/10 includes an instrumental version of "Want More Need Less".
- The 1995 film The Doom Generation included the track "On The Wheel".
- "Chinese Burn" is playing whilst Buffy and Faith are dancing in The Bronze during the Buffy the Vampire Slayer episode "Bad Girls". A remix of the song by Lunatic Calm was featured on the soundtrack of FIFA 2001.
