= FatLip Recordings =

Independent record label

- Founded: 1996
- Founder: Curve
- Status: Inactive since 2002
- Genre: Alternative rock, electronica
- Country of origin: United Kingdom
- Location: London

FatLip Recordings was an independent record label owned, operated and releasing music by the band Curve.

== History ==
The label was only active when Curve wished to release music independently. It was first used in 1996. Curve had recently reunited, having been split up for two years, and were without a record label, as their previous deal with Anxious Records had expired. They therefore self-released the 'Pink Girl With the Blues' single on their own FatLip Recordings label. The label became dormant when the band signed with Universal Records.

Curve's relationship with Universal was strained, with the situation becoming untenable after Universal refused to release Curve's latest album, Gift, in 2000. Curve were completed their contract with Universal in early 2001 without Gift being released. Freed from record label control, Curve began putting MP3s of new and old material their site for fans to download. These, along with some new tracks, were collected together on CD in Open Day at the Hate Fest, which was released through the band's website later in 2001. The brisk sales of the CD made Universal realise that there was a market for Gift and the album was finally released, but only in the United States.

The FatLip brand was once again used for Curve's next album, The New Adventures of Curve, which was released through the band's website in 2002.

A few weeks after The New Adventures of Curve was released, Gift was finally released in the United Kingdom. It was released by Artful Records (who had a distribution deal with Universal), though FatLip is also named on the packaging. A similar arrangement was used for the 'Perish' single.

== Releases ==
- 1996: Curve – 'Pink Girl With the Blues' (single – CD/7")
- 2001: Curve – Open Day at the Hate Fest (compilation album – CD)
- 2002: Curve – The New Adventures of Curve (studio album – CD)
- 2002: Curve – Gift (studio album – CD (UK release only); with Artful Records)
- 2002: Curve – 'Perish' (single – CD; with Artful Records)
