= MotoGP 09/10 =

2010 racing video game

- North American cover art featuring Casey Stoner and Valentino Rossi
- Developer: Monumental Games
- Publisher: Capcom
- Series: MotoGP
- Platforms: PlayStation 3, Xbox 360
- Release: AU: March 18, 2010 (X360); EU: March 19, 2010; AU: March 19, 2010 (PS3); NA: March 23, 2010
- Genre: Racing
- Modes: Single-player, multiplayer

MotoGP 09/10 is a racing video game, part of the MotoGP series. It is available on Xbox 360 and PlayStation 3. It is the first of two MotoGP games developed by Monumental Games.

== Gameplay ==
=== Career mode ===
MotoGP 09/10 features 4 modes with the first of them being Career Mode. Players take control of their career on and off of the track competing in races and hiring engineers, team managers and press officers to help further their career as a pro and ultimately win the MotoGP World Championship. Demonstrating their riding skills on the track through overtaking, slip-streaming and showboating will be rewarded with Rider Reputation points. Pushing too hard can be detrimental as collisions and crashes will reduce the reputation bonus at the end of each race. The more rider reputation points players earn, the more attractive they become to other manufacturers, sponsors, and employees. The player's team will also research upgrades for an existing bike to increase its performance. As players start off at the 125cc they can upgrade their team into the 250cc/Moto2 series and then ultimately into the MotoGP series. Career Mode has a limitless number of years allowing players to continue career mode indefinitely.

=== Championship mode ===
Players can race in 125cc, 250cc/Moto2 and MotoGP championships from the 2009 and 2010 seasons as it unfolds. The realistic AI will emulate true racing pack with different riding styles and pace making this a challenging mode for all GP fans. Only 125cc class is available in the beginning and Championship more is required to be completed along with unlocking requirements in order to access all contents available in base game.

=== Arcade ===
Players must show off their skill to stay in the race as they compete to finish a whole season in 125, 250/Moto2 or MotoGP class before running out of time. Each lap, clean section, overtake and top speed reached will reward players with more time but crashing off the track or getting overtaken will cause time to be deducted from the player's total and the chances of living the MotoGP dream will be over.

=== Online ===
Compete against other riders across the globe, in online multiplayer mode. There can be up to 20 bikes in a race.

=== Soundtrack ===
The game has a soundtrack featuring contemporary breakbeat, dubstep and drum and bass producers, and also rock artists (provided by Platinum Sound Publishing):
Torche: Healer
Freeland: Best Fish Tacos in Ensenada
Freeland: Under Control
Subsource: The Ides
The Eighties Matchbox B-Line Disaster: Love Turns to Hate
Plump DJ's: Rocket Soul
White Lies: Death (Chase and Status Remix)
Home Video: Confession (of a Time Traveller)
Boom Boom Satellites: Kick it Out
Boom Boom Satellites: Morning After
State of Mind: Sunking
Vacation: Make Up Your Mind
Curve: Want More Need Less
Evil Nine: Twist the Knife (feat Emily Breeze)

== Release ==
=== Demo ===
A demo was announced to be released on the Xbox Live Marketplace about 1 month before release which would give it a release of February. The demo consists of a stripped-down Championship Mode which is limited to the 125cc class and the Mugello Circuit. It also contains the 600cc Moto2 Arcade Mode and the 800cc MotoGP Time Trial mode. The demo was released on March 4, 2010, on the Xbox 360 and PS3.

=== Downloadable content ===
Capcom announced two free DLC packs to be released sometime after the game's release. The first pack contains the 800cc bike class with all of the bikes, riders and team liveries, as well as the brand-new track for the 2010 MotoGP season, the new Silverstone Arena Circuit. The second pack includes all of the bikes, riders and team livery updates for the Moto2 and 125cc bike classes, giving players brand new MotoGP 2010 data far earlier than ever before.

== Reception ==
Reception

Aggregate score
Aggregator	Score	
Aggregator	PS3	Xbox 360
Metacritic	70/100	69/100

Review scores
Publication	Score	
Publication	PS3	Xbox 360
Eurogamer	N/A	7/10
Game Informer	8.25/10	8.25/10
GameRevolution	D+	D+
GameSpot	7/10	7/10
GameTrailers	6.2/10	6.2/10
GameZone	6.5/10	N/A
IGN	6.7/10	6.7/10
Official Xbox Magazine (US)	N/A	6/10
PlayStation: The Official Magazine	3/5	N/A
VideoGamer.com	7/10	7/10
411Mania	N/A	6.5/10

The game received "average" reviews on both platforms according to the review aggregation website Metacritic.
