= SPC ECO =

British shoegaze band

- Origin: UK
- Genres: Alternative rock, dream pop, drone, electronic, shoegazing
- Years active: 2007–present
- Labels: Club AC30 (2008); The Electric Label (UK, 2009-); Noiseplus Music (US, 2009-); Quince (Japan, 2009-); ELaB Records (UK); Saint Marie Records (US, 2014-2016); Tapete Records (Germany, 2017)
- Members: Dean Garcia; Rose Berlin
- Past members: Joey Levenson
- Website: spceco.com

SPC ECO (pronounced Space Echo) are a British shoegaze band formed in 2007.

The band consists of Dean Garcia (bass, drums, guitar and programming), formerly of Curve, and his daughter Rose Berlin (vocals); and a long list of "friends and collaborators" including: Joey Levenson, Perry Pelonero, Jarek Leskiewicz, Debbie Smith, Steve Monti, HKG, Preston Maddox, Ed Shearmur, Alan Moulder, Masa at Quince Japan, Julian Baker, Anne Baker, Freddie Lomaz, Slade Templeton, J P Wombbaby, Alex Keevil, Jo Neale, Zac, Laura and Em, Robin Allport, Gary Crowley, Chris McCormack, Baxter, Merlin Rhys Jones, Chris Rigg, Phill Savidge, Jo Murray, and John Howarrd Fletcher.

== Discography ==
All releases are issued on ELaB Records (aka Eco Lab Recordings), an independent label owned and operated by Dean Garcia; with the exception of the You're Alright / Another Day single issued on Club AC30.

3-D was also released on Noiseplus Music, Quince Records, Electric; and the Silver Clouds EP was released on Electric. Four albums were also released on the Saint Marie Records label between 2014 and 2016.

The single "Push" from the Push EP was featured on "BBC London Introducing: The best in new music with Gary Crowley". on 26 January 2013. Crowley commented "We played them before to always a good reaction; Rose likes twisters and Marcel Duchamp, Dean likes eating biscuits and staying up late." A review by Wave Maker Magazine stated "Push is undeniably one of those songs that automatically has the ability to put you into a trance, and for all of the right reasons."

=== Albums ===
- 3-D (2009; 1 January 2010)
- You Tell Me (1 November 2011)
- Dark Notes (18 August 2012)
- Sirens and Satellites (18 September 2013)
- The Art of Pop (28 June 2014)
- Dark Matter (3 May 2015)
- All We Have Is Now (25 March 2016)
- Anomalies (12 August 2016)
- Calm (22 August 2017)
- Fifteen (15 February 2019)
- 6月LP (1 June 2020)
- 9月ST (1 September 2020)
- Day By Day (18 June 2021)
- Times Like These (16 July 2021)
- Be The Change (22 July 2022)
- Elevated (16 Dec 2022)
- How Did We Get Here? (15 Mar 2024)

=== EPs ===
- Silver Clouds (5 May 2010)
- Out of the Sky (25 September 2010)
- Big Fat World (10 May 2011)
- Don't Say (10 March 2012)
- Push (12 December 2012)
- Zombie (30 September 2014)
- Smile (8 July 2015)
- Favourite Colour (12 August 2016)
- Under My Skin (10 February 2017)
- 2月EP (1 February 2020)
- 3月EP (1 March 2020)
- 4月EP (1 April 2020)
- 5月EP (1 May 2020)
- 7月EP (1 July 2020)
- 8月EP (1 August 2020)
- 10月EP (1 October 2020)
- 11月EP (1 November 2020)
- 12月EP (1 December 2020)
- Coming Back For You (6 August 2021)
- Break Apart (31 October 2021)
- Return (14 November 2021)
- Haunted (21 December 2021)
- Astro (28 January 2022)
- Be Everything (17 April 2022)
- Life Left (18 June 2022)
- Hush (26 August 2022)
- Hide Me In Space (19 September 2022)
- Feel The Spice (4 November 2022)
- Wish (3 February 2023)
- Songs for Friday (5 April 2024)

=== Singles ===
- "You're Alright / Another Day" (2007)
- "Silent Night" (2010)
- "Ave Verum Corpus" (2011)
- "Hollow Talk" (2012)
- "Because" (2013)
- "Fallen Stars" (2013)
- "Delusional Waste" (2013)
- "Fuck You" (2014)
- "2+2=5" (2014)
- "Hear Me Now" (2015)
- "Feel Me" (2015)
- "Ours" Ltd 7" (2016)
- "Wish you Were Near" (2020)
- "For You / Helpless" (2021)
- "Make A Wish / The Way We Were" (2021)
- "The Hollows / Not A Thing" (2021)
- "Just For A Day / Our Time To Die" (2021)
- "Take The World / All For The Best" (2021)
- "When It Calls / One Of Those Things" (2021)
- "Forever" (2022)
- "Precious Life" (2022)
- "Just This" (2022)
- "Everything Changes" (2022)
- "Get Useless" (2022)
- "Die In The Sun" (2023)

=== Compilation albums ===
- SPC and Time Vol. 1 (2015)
- SPC and Time Vol. 2 (2015)

=== Remixes ===
- 3-D: Alternative Mixes and Remixes (2010)
- The Art Of Pop Remixes + (2014)
