= Breaking Point (Lunatic Calm album) =

Studio album by Lunatic Calm
- Released: January 8, 2002
- Length: 56:12
- Label: City Of Angels

Lunatic Calm chronology
Metropol (1997)	Breaking Point (2002)

Breaking Point is an album by the English electronic dance music group Lunatic Calm, released in 2002. This was to be their last album before their split in 2003.

== Track listing ==
No.	Title	Length
1.	"Beatbox Burning"	4:03
2.	"Sound Of The Revolution"	4:03
3.	"Borderliners"	5:03
4.	"Neverstop"	5:09
5.	"I Go Wild"	7:27
6.	"Yourfuture"	5:59
7.	"Yesterday"	2:22
8.	"Shockwave"	4:07
9.	"Liberation Radio"	4:53
10.	"Nobody"	3:22
11.	"Resurrection City"	7:26
12.	"Revolution Rewind"	3:18
Total length:		56:12

== Personnel ==
=== Lunatic Calm are ===
- Simon "sHack" Shackleton - production, mixing, arrangement, lead vocals, keyboards, guitars, drum programming, songwriting
- Howard "Howie" Saunders - production, mixing, arrangement, keyboards, guitars, bass

=== Additional musicians ===
- Jez Noble - drums, percussion ("Nobody")
- Ronnie Archer - bass ("Resurrection City")
- John Matthias - string arrangements ("Nobody")
- Chris Rogers - electronic drums, programming, ("Beatbox Burning") engineering

=== Technical ===
- Mandy Parnell - mastering
- The Luna Module - recording studio
