= Radio Sessions (Curve album) =

Compilation album by Curve
- Released: 7 June 1993
- Recorded: 10 March 1991; 11 February 1992
- Genre: Shoegaze; alternative rock
- Label: Anxious
- Producer: Dale Griffin; Mike Robinson

Curve chronology
Pubic Fruit (1992)	Radio Sessions (1993)	Cuckoo (1993)

Professional ratings
Review scores
Source	Rating
AllMusic	3/5 stars
Melody Maker	(mixed)
NME	6/10
Q	2/5 stars
Vox	8/10

Radio Sessions is a compilation album of recordings made by the British band Curve during their two sessions for John Peel's show on the UK broadcasting station Radio 1.

== Track listing ==
1. "Ten Little Girls" – 4:42
2. "No Escape From Heaven" – 4:47
3. "The Colour Hurts" – 3:48
4. "Coast is Clear" – 4:14
5. "Die Like a Dog" – 4:35
6. "Horror Head" – 3:30
7. "Arms Out" – 4:46
8. "Split into Fractions" – 4:47

Tracks 1 to 4 were recorded on 10 March 1991, broadcast on 30 March 1991, and produced by Dale Griffin. Tracks 5 to 8 were recorded on 11 February 1992, broadcast on 23 February 1992, and produced by Mike Robinson.
