= Come Clean (Curve album) =

Studio album by Curve
- Released: 10 March 1998
- Recorded: July 1996 – September 1997
- Studio: Todal (London)
- Genre: Alternative rock, electronica, trip hop, big beat
- Length: 57:08
- Label: Estupendo; Universal
- Producer: Curve; Tim Simenon; Steve Osborne

Curve chronology
Cuckoo (1993)	Come Clean (1998)	Open Day at the Hate Fest (2001)

Singles from Come Clean
- 1. "Chinese Burn" Released: 18 November 1997; 2. "Coming Up Roses" Released: 4 May 1998

Professional ratings
Review scores
Source	Rating
AllMusic	4.5/5 stars
The Independent	2/5
NME	4/10
Pitchfork	7.6/10
Q	3/5 stars
Select	2/5

Come Clean is the third studio album by English alternative rock band Curve. It was released on 10 March 1998 by Estupendo Records and Universal, and was the first Curve album to be released following their temporary split in 1994 and reformation in 1996.

Come Clean marked a shift to a style more informed by dance and electronic music than Curve's earlier records. Significantly, the commercial success of and critical acclaim for Come Clean – at least relative to the reception that the group's harsher and less accessible 1993 album Cuckoo had received – encouraged Curve to continue recording.

== Musical style ==
Stuart Derdeyn of The Province wrote that Come Clean found Curve "updating its sound to better reflect the noise and punch of contemporary electronic rock". The A.V. Club's Joshua Klein said that the band expanded on the dance and electronic elements of their previous albums, with the music on Come Clean placing a heavier emphasis on "big beats". Pitchfork critic Chris Ott noted the album's "danceable drum loops" and "blurry, detached" vocals, as well as its influence from trip hop band Portishead and the "ascendant club-techno" sound of The Chemical Brothers. According to Ott, the record forgoes the "sexual intensity" and "icy shoegaze guitars" of Curve's earlier work.

== Release ==
After disbanding two years earlier, Curve reformed in 1996 and within the year announced the forthcoming release of a new album, which was tentatively titled Magic Music Medicine and set to be issued by the band's self-operated label FatLip Recordings. In 1997, Curve signed to Universal, which ultimately issued the album, newly titled Come Clean.

Come Clean was released by Estupendo Records and its parent label Universal on 10 March 1998 in the United States, and on 18 May 1998 in the United Kingdom. The lead single from Come Clean, "Chinese Burn", was released on 18 November 1997. "Coming Up Roses" was issued as the album's second single on 4 May 1998.

== Track listing ==
All tracks are written by Dean Garcia and Toni Halliday.

No.	Title	Producer(s)	Length
1.	"Chinese Burn"	Curve; Steve Osborne	4:50
2.	"Coming Up Roses"	Curve; Osborne	4:31
3.	"Something Familiar"	Curve; Tim Simenon	4:08
4.	"Dog Bone"	Curve	3:13
5.	"Alligators Getting Up"	Curve; Simenon	4:36
6.	"Dirty High"	Curve; Osborne; Simenon	5:21
7.	"Killer Baby"	Curve; Simenon	3:55
8.	"Sweetback"	Curve; Simenon	4:31
9.	"Forgotten Sanity"	Curve; Simenon	4:32
10.	"Cotton Candy"	Curve; Simenon	5:32
11.	"Beyond Reach"	Curve; Simenon	4:55
12.	"Come Clean"	Curve	2:16
13.	"Recovery"	Curve; Simenon	4:48
Total length:			57:08

== Personnel ==
Credits are adapted from the album's liner notes.

Curve

- Dean Garcia – bass, drums, guitar, keyboard and electronics programming
- Toni Halliday – vocals, guitar, sound effects

Additional musicians

- Flood – electronics on "Dirty High"
- Sally Herbert – violin on "Something Familiar" and "Forgotten Sanity"
- Ben Hillier – additional drum programming on "Killer Baby"
- Alan Moulder – guitar on "Coming Up Roses", "Killer Baby", "Forgotten Sanity", "Cotton Candy" and "Recovery"
- Toshio Nakanishi – electronics on "Alligators Getting Up" and "Killer Baby"
- Steve Osborne – arrangement on "Chinese Burn", "Coming Up Roses" and "Dirty High"
- Tim Simenon – arrangement
- Óskar Páll Sveinsson – Moog synthesizer on "Cotton Candy"
- Justin Welch – drums on "Something Familiar"

Production

- James Brown – mixing (assistant)
- Curve – production, engineering, recording, mixing on "Come Clean"
- Ben Hillier – engineering on "Chinese Burn", "Coming Up Roses" and "Dirty High", mixing (assistant) on "Chinese Burn"
- Graham Hog – mixing (assistant)
- Guy Massey – mixing (assistant)
- Kevin Metcalfe – mastering
- Alan Moulder – mixing
- Darren Nash – engineering (assistant) on "Chinese Burn", "Coming Up Roses" and "Dirty High", mixing (assistant) on "Chinese Burn"
- Steve Osborne – production and transferral on "Chinese Burn", "Coming Up Roses" and "Dirty High", mixing on "Chinese Burn"
- Tom Rixton – engineering (assistant), sorting
- Dave Russell – mixing (assistant)
- Tim Simenon – production, mixing, transferral
- Óskar Páll Sveinsson – engineering, Pro Tools

Design

- Brooksy – cover photography
- Richard Harrington – art direction, design
- Anna Pretty – metal brand creation

== Charts ==
Chart (1998)	Peak position
UK Albums (OCC)	103
US Heatseekers Albums (Billboard)	26
