= Metropol (album) =

Studio album by Lunatic Calm
- Released: 1997
- Length: 61:44
- Label: Universal

Lunatic Calm chronology
Metropol (1997)	Breaking Point (2002)

Professional ratings
Review scores
Source	Rating
Allmusic	3/5 stars

Metropol is the debut album by English electronic dance music group Lunatic Calm.

The song "Leave You Far Behind," is used in The Matrix, Mortal Kombat Annihilation, Test Drive 6, MotorStorm, Drive, and an early teaser trailer for Spider-Man. The song is arguably the group's most famous track and is, apparently, the only one to receive a full music video directed by David Slade. It portrays Simon Shackleton, with his face painted blue and his eyes pitch black, singing the lyrics as rapid edits and fast forwarded footage has him dancing and swaying within a warehouse and outside in a forested area.

"Fuze", "Leave You Far Behind" and "The Sound" were added in the hoax Prodigy album "The Castbreeder" in 1998 under the names "The Castbreeder" (at the very beginning), "Castl Road" and "Abnormal Bunx" respectively.

== Track listing ==
No.	Title	Length
1.	"Fuze"	0:30
2.	"Leave You Far Behind"	3:11
3.	"The Sound"	6:56
4.	"Neon Ray"	8:36
5.	"It Evolves on Its Own"	5:54
6.	"Choke"	4:58
7.	"Long Shadows"	6:32
8.	"Roll the Dice"	3:20
9.	"Meltdown"	10:27
10.	"Metropol"	4:04
11.	"Punkywhitenoisething"	4:28
12.	"Neon Reprise"	2:39
Total length:		61:43

== Personnel ==
=== Lunatic Calm are ===
- Simon "sHack" Shackleton - production, mixing, engineering, arrangement, lead vocals, keyboards, guitars, drum programming, songwriting, recording
- Howard "Howie" Saunders - production, mixing, engineering, arrangement, keyboards, guitars, bass, recording

=== Additional musicians ===
- Jez Noble - drums, percussion

=== Other ===
- Frank Arkwright - mastering
- The Luna Module - recording studio
- Simon Lewin - logo illustration
- Danielle Chanel, Matt Bale - sleeve
- Bell - artist management
