= The New Adventures of Curve =

Studio album by Curve
- Released: June 2002
- Recorded: January–May 2002
- Genre: Electronica, alternative rock
- Length: 53:30
- Label: FatLip Recordings
- Producer: Curve

Curve chronology
Gift (2001)	The New Adventures of Curve (2002)	The Way of Curve (2004)

Professional ratings
Review scores
Source	Rating
Allmusic	3/5 stars
Release Magazine	9/10 stars

The New Adventures of Curve is the fifth and final studio album released by the British alternative rock band Curve.

The LP was exclusively available via the group's official website.

== Track listing ==
All tracks are written by Dean Garcia and Toni Halliday.

No.	Title	Length
1.	"Answers"	5:28
2.	"Till The Cows Come Home"	6:54
3.	"Every Good Girl"	7:38
4.	"Cold Comfort (Deepsky Remix)"	6:24
5.	"Star"	6:45
6.	"Nice and Easy"	3:26
7.	"Signals and Alibis"	7:12
8.	"Sinner"	5:08
9.	"Joy"	4:25
Total length:		53:20
