= Open Day at the Hate Fest =

Compilation album by Curve
- Released: May 2001
- Recorded: 1996–2001
- Genre: Electronica, alternative rock
- Label: Self-release (FatLip Recordings)

Curve chronology
Come Clean (1998)	Open Day at the Hate Fest (2001)	Gift (2001)

Professional ratings
Review scores
Source	Rating
Allmusic	link

Open Day at the Hate Fest is an album-length, internet-released compilation of music recorded by Curve since their reformation in 1996.

Open Day at the Hate Fest was produced during a time that saw Curve embroiled in legal battles with Universal Records over the company's decision to shelve Gift, the record Curve had recorded as the official follow-up to 1998's Come Clean. Following brisk online sales of Open Day at the Hate Fest, Universal relented, and agreed to release Gift later the same year under the Hip-O brand.

== Track listing ==
1. "Nowhere" – 4:06
2. "The Birds They Do Fly" – 4:10
3. "Ché" – 5:04
4. "Turnaround" – 4:24
5. "You Don't Know" – 6:23
6. "Backwards Glance" – 4:58
7. "Speed Crash" – 4:53
8. "Storm" – 4:28
9. "Caught in the Alleyway" – 5:44
10. "Open Day at the Hate Fest" – 7:02

"Nowhere" had originally been recorded for the soundtrack of Gregg Araki's eponymous film, while "You Don't Know" had already been used on the soundtrack for the film Gossip.
