= Gift (Curve album) =

Studio album by Curve
- Released: 18 September 2001 (US); 1 July 2002 (UK); 3 February 2003 (Australia)
- Recorded: 2000
- Label: Hip-O (US); FatLip/Artful (UK); Hoop Culture (Australia)

Curve chronology
Open Day at the Hate Fest (2001)	Gift (2001)	The New Adventures of Curve (2002)

Professional ratings
Review scores
Source	Rating
Allmusic	3.5/5 stars
Q	4/5 stars
Kerrang!	3/5 stars
Rock Sound	5/10
Metal Hammer	8/10
Meltdown	4/5 stars

Gift is the fourth studio album to be released by the British alternative rock band Curve.

Following two years of legal wrangles between the group and their then record company, Universal Records, the online success of Curve's self-released album Open Day at the Hate Fest convinced Universal - who had been threatening to shelve the album completely - to market it in the United States in 2001 under the Hip-O Records brand. The UK version was released a year later by FatLip Recordings in collaboration with Artful Records. A year after that, the album was released in Australia by Hoop Culture Records.

The album was co-produced by Ben Grosse and Curve. Apart from Curve mainstays Dean Garcia and Toni Halliday, additional musicians who contributed to the album were Kevin Shields, Steve Monti, Alan Moulder, Flood, Rob Holliday, Geno Lenardo, Ben Grosse and Alan Wilder.

Of the songs on the record, "Hell Above Water" has gained the highest public profile as a result of its use in the trailer for the 2002 film Spider-Man, within the 2003 film Bookies and the 2004 film Mindhunters, the trailer for the 2008 film Iron Man, and within the 2008 film Lakeview Terrace. It is also featured in the PlayStation 2 game Gran Turismo 4, the PlayStation 3 game MotorStorm and an episode for the popular crime drama CSI (Episode 207, "Caged").

== Track listing ==
No.	Title	Length
1.	"Hell Above Water"	4:04
2.	"Gift"	4:26
3.	"Want More Need Less"	4:35
4.	"Perish"	5:16
5.	"Hung Up"	5:55
6.	"Chainmail"	5:11
7.	"Fly with the High"	3:33
8.	"My Tiled White Floor"	5:16
9.	"Polaroid"	4:00
10.	"Bleeding Heart"	4:07
Total length:		46:23
