= Lunatic Calm =

British electronic music group

- Origin: London, England
- Genres: Big beat; electronic; trip hop; breakbeat
- Years active: 1996–2003
- Labels: MCA Records; City of Angels
- Past members: Simon "sHack" Shackleton; Howard "Howie" Saunders; Jez Noble

Lunatic Calm were an English electronic music group formed in 1996. Despite a wide-ranging sound palette, the group was best known for their high impact, industrial-tinged big beat compositions.

== History ==
Formed in 1996 and composed of Simon "sHack" Shackleton and Howard "Howie" Saunders, they released two well received albums, as well as several singles and a wide range of remixes. The two had known each other since an early age, and prior to forming Lunatic Calm, they also played in several bands with Thom Yorke (Radiohead frontman), namely Headless Chickens and Flicker Noise.

== Metropol (1997) ==
Their debut album Metropol was often compared to the works of The Prodigy and other bands, although it ranged from offbeat and psychedelic trip hop to heavy turbo-charged big beat. Record company MCA failed to support the band and they switched their attentions to the American market where they enjoyed a series of successful tours with other groups including Crystal Method. The most notable track from that album, and the one for which the group remains best known, is "Leave You Far Behind". This track has appeared on numerous movie soundtracks including The Matrix, Charlie's Angels, Mortal Kombat Annihilation, a teaser trailer of Spider-Man, and the short-lived series The Crow: Stairway to Heaven. A number of Lunatic Calm's tracks were used on video games, and the group did numerous remixes for various artists including Bush, DJ Scissorkicks, and Curve. The production equipment included an Atari ST, Akai S1000, Roland SH-101, Roland D-20, Nord Rack, Novation SuperNova II, Novation Bass Station, Alesis Quadraverb, Lexicon Reverb Signal Processor, Gibson and Fender electric guitars and a Mackie 16-channel, 4-Bus Mixer.

== Breaking Point (2002) and disbanding ==
The group's second album, Breaking Point was released in 2002, after several years of wrangling with record companies, and with little to no promotion. As the album was due to be released, the record label City of Angels stopped releasing music. Without label support the band were unable to continue and Lunatic Calm disbanded in 2003. In Simon Shackleton's words: "There was no label support at all, a complete failure to promote or help in any way with either album, so everything we did we did ourselves. After a while, we simply ran out of energy and funds having been burnt badly on both albums."

== Aftermath ==
Simon Shackleton has remained an active and respected figure in electronic and hybrid music, releasing under a range of aliases including Elite Force, Zodiac Cartel, and his own name, Simon Shackleton. A leading pioneer of the Tech-Funk sound—a fusion of house, breaks, electro, and techno—he ran the influential labels U&A Recordings and Fused & Bruised. His work as Elite Force earned numerous accolades, including multiple Breakspoll Awards and a Beatport Award.

Following a successful career as a touring DJ and producer, Shackleton shifted towards a more emotive, cinematic sound under his own name. In 2025, he released the deeply personal album, The Shadowmaker, which explores themes of vulnerability, loss, and human resilience. The album is supported by an immersive live multimedia show that blends film, narrative, and live performance, debuting at the Holiday Theater in Denver.

He has also composed music for film, television, advertising, and gaming, and remains a regular performer at Burning Man and other transformational festivals.

== Discography ==
=== Albums ===
- Metropol (1997)
- Breaking Point (2002)

=== Singles ===
- "Centista" (1996)
- "Leave You Far Behind" (1997)
- "Roll the Dice" (1997)
- "LC Double '0' Series" (1998)
- "One Step" (1999)

=== Remixes ===
- The Heads - "Don't Take My Kindness for Weakness" (1996)
- Amen - "Vacuum" (1996)
- Collapsed Lung - "Ballad Night" (1996)
- Hurricane #1 - "Chain Reaction" (1997)
- Black Grape - "Get Higher" (1997)
- Bush - "Comedown" (1997)
- Curve - "Chinese Burn" (1997)
- Definition of Sound - "Outsider" (1997)
- Elite Force - "Cool Like The Man" (1997)
- Meat Katie - "Boned" (1997)
- Pitchshifter - "Genius" (1998)
- Mankind Liberation Front - "Isolated" (1999)
- DJ Scissorkicks - "Clap Yo' Hands" (1999)
- Earl Hagen - "I Spy" (2001)

=== Soundtrack appearances ===
- The Jackal (1997) - "Leave You Far Behind"
- Mortal Kombat Annihilation (1997) - "Leave You Far Behind" (V2. Instrumental Mix)
- Head On (1998) - "Leave You Far Behind"
- ESPN X-Games Pro Boarder (1998) - "Leave You Far Behind"
- The Matrix (1999) - "Leave You Far Behind" (Lunatic vs. Lunatic Rollercoaster Remix)
- Twin Dragons (Theatrical Trailer) (1999) - "Leave You Far Behind"
- Arlington Road (1999) - "Neon Reprise"
- Need for Speed: High Stakes (1999) - "Roll the Dice"
- Test Drive 6 (1999) - "Leave You Far Behind"
- FIFA 2000 (1999) - "LC001" (Neon Ray Mix)
- La Femme Nikita: Getting Out of the Reverse (2000) - "Leave You Far Behind"
- Charlie's Angels (2000) - "Leave You Far Behind" (V2. Instrumental Mix)
- The Guilty (2000) - "Leave You Far Behind"
- Titan A.E. (Trailer) (2000) - "Leave You Far Behind"
- Formula One 2001 (2001) - "Shockwave"
- Jeremy McGrath Supercross World (2001) - "Leave You Far Behind"
- Tomcats (2001) - "Roll the Dice" (Fatboy Slim vocal mix)
- Spider-Man (Teaser Trailer) (2002) - "Leave You Far Behind"
- Buffy the Vampire Slayer: Radio Sunnydale (2003) - "Sound of the Revolution"
- Lara Croft Tomb Raider: The Cradle of Life: Music from and Inspired by the Motion Picture (2003) - "Leave You Far Behind"
- MotorStorm (2007) - "Leave You Far Behind"
- Drive (2007) - "Leave You Far Behind"
