= Debbie Smith (musician) =

British guitar and bass player

- Origin: United Kingdom
- Occupations: Musician; DJ
- Instruments: Guitar; bass guitar

Debbie Smith is a British guitar and bass player who has been in several bands from the 1990s to the present, including Curve, Echobelly, Nightnurse, Snowpony, Bows, SPC ECO, Blindness, The London Dirthole Company and current bands Ye Nuns, and Where We Sleep.

Smith was interviewed for the 1995 book Never Mind the Bollocks: Women Rewrite Rock by Amy Raphael (published in the US as Grrrls: Viva Rock Divas). She was also interviewed and quoted for the book Frock Rock: Women Performing Popular Music, a sociological study of women musicians in British popular music; at the time of the interview she was in Echobelly, and the book notes that Skin and Yolanda Charles both said that Smith was the only current black British female guitarist either one of them could think of. Frock Rock says that "women like Skin, Natacha Atlas, Yolanda Charles, Mary Genis, and Debbie Smith are now acting as crucial role models for future generations of black women."

In 1997, Debbie Smith was the subject of the third episode of a TV series with the blanket title A Woman Called Smith (first broadcast on BBC2, 9 April 1997).

Smith is a lesbian, and appears in a 2021 documentary film, Rebel Dykes, about the 1980s London dyke community; at that point in time she was in feminist lesbian post-punk band Mouth Almighty. She continues to perform as guitarist and DJ, and works at London music shop Intoxica! Records.
