= Toni Halliday =

British musician (born 1964)

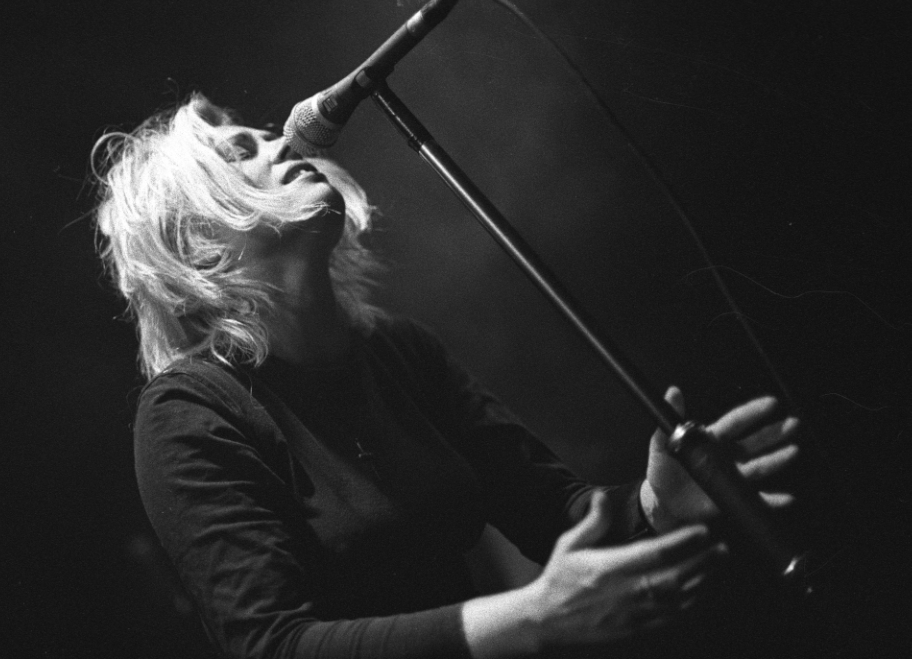
- Halliday live at the Garage, London, in 1995

Background information
- Born: Antoinette Halliday; 5 July 1964 (age 62)
- Origin: Parsons Green, London, England
- Genres: Alternative rock; electronic; shoegazing; dream pop
- Occupation: Musician
- Instruments: Vocals; electric guitar; bass guitar
- Years active: 1978–present
- Labels: Charisma; Anxious; FatLip; Universal
- Member of: Chatelaine
- Formerly of: Curve; Photofitz; State of Play; The Uncles; Scylla
- Website: myspace.com/chatelainemusic

Antoinette "Toni" Halliday (born 5 July 1964) is a British musician best known as the lead vocalist, lyricist, and occasional guitarist of the alternative rock band Curve, along with Dean Garcia.

Halliday was also a member of the bands Photofitz, The Uncles, State of Play and Scylla. She released solo work as Toni Halliday and Chatelaine. She collaborated with artists like Robert Plant, Recoil, The Future Sound of London, Leftfield, Paul van Dyk, Freaky Chakra, DJ? Acucrack, Headcase, The Killers, Acid Android, and Orbital.

Halliday has a contralto vocal range.

== Early life and career ==
Halliday was born on 5 July 1964 in Parsons Green, London, and brought up in various locations across Europe, before eventually settling in Washington New Town, Tyne and Wear. Her father is British and her mother Polish.

From 1978 to 1980, Halliday was the lead vocalist in a punk rock band named Photofitz (initially called the Incest), after which she left to start a solo career. In 1980, a sixteen-year-old Halliday recorded a collection of songs with producer Steve Thompson, which remained unreleased until 2021. Seven of these songs were released as a part of the Iron Man of Norton box set on digital platforms in August 2021.

The first commercially released recording to feature Halliday was the single "The Smile and the Kiss" (1983) by the new wave band Bonk, on which she performed uncredited backing vocals. The following year, Halliday's new band the Uncles released the single "What's the Use of Pretending", whereupon the singer returned to performing backing vocals for other artists, including the Robert Plant albums Shaken 'n' Stirred (1985), and Now and Zen (1988).

In 1985, Halliday and multi-instrumentalist Dean Garcia formed the band State of Play, together with Garcia's wife Julie Fletcher and Eurythmics drummer Olle Romö. The following year, State of Play released an LP on Virgin Records titled Balancing the Scales, a non-hit album that spawned two singles: "Natural Colour" and "Rock-a-bye Baby".

After the subsequent demise of State of Play, Halliday made another attempt at a solo career. Her album Hearts and Handshakes (produced by Halliday and Alan Moulder) was released in 1989, a year after it was finished, and four singles were taken from it: "Weekday", "Love Attraction", "Time Turns Around", and "Woman in Mind". The twelve-inch release of "Time Turns Around" features a special version of the song remixed by Alan Wilder.

=== Curve ===
Dean Garcia had performed on Hearts and Handshakes, and the pair now collaborated to form Curve, with Halliday serving as lead singer. Their partnership would last from 1990 to 2005. The group's main releases are the studio albums Doppelgänger (1992), Cuckoo (1993), Come Clean (1998), Gift (2001), The New Adventures of Curve (2002), and the compilations Radio Sessions (1993), Open Day at the Hate Fest (2001), The Way of Curve (2004), Rare and Unreleased (2010).

=== Scylla ===
In 1995, a year after the first, temporary dissolution of Curve, Halliday formed the band Scylla with Ricky Barber, Lindy Pocock, Fiona Lynsky and Julian Bown. The group toured small clubs in the summer of 1995. Scylla's only recording to have been officially released is the song "Helen's Face", which can be found on the Showgirls soundtrack of the Paul Verhoeven film of the same name. Another Scylla song, "Get a Helmet", can be heard in the Gregg Araki film Nowhere. Scylla recorded a 12-track demo with both Alan Moulder and Flood producing, but no album was released. A bootleg of these demo tracks can be found on the internet.

=== Other work ===
Following the emergence of Curve in 1991, Halliday co-wrote and performed vocals on two songs ("Edge to Life" and "Bloodline") for the Recoil album Bloodline (1992). She collaborated with the Future Sound of London for the song "Cerebral" from Lifeforms (1994), with Freaky Chakra for the song "Budded on Earth to Bloom in Heaven" from Lowdown Motivator (1994), and with Leftfield for their No. 18 UK hit "Original" from Leftism (1995). She was also featured on "Original"'s music video. Halliday also contributed additional vocals to Nine Inch Nails 1999 album The Fragile.

In 2002, Halliday recorded a number of songs with the Prague Philharmonic Orchestra with plans to release an EP. By the end of the sessions there were enough songs recorded for an album with a working title of For Tomorrow's Sorrows. The title track was made available on the official Curve website for a short time; along with the rest of the album, it remains unreleased.

Halliday also collaborated with Headcase, Bias, Acid Android and DJ? Acucrack. In 2006, she was featured on the Killers' first Christmas track, "A Great Big Sled". She contributed vocals to Orbital's soundtrack for the 2012 re-make of the film Pusher.

In 2013, Halliday contributed vocals to a new track, "Lost in the Noise", a collaboration with Huw Williams. The track can be found on the compilation album Ethereal Electro Pop on Altitude Music. Another Halliday track for 2013 (co-produced by Louise Dowd) called "Down in a Dark Place" can be heard in a trailer for the television series The Vampire Diaries. Along with "Down in a Dark Place", two other new songs appeared—"Nowhere to Hide" and "Now the Time Is Here". "Nowhere to Hide" was officially used during promotion and advertising of the Sochi Winter Olympics 2014.

Halliday released a new song "Suffragette" in November 2016 on the compilation album The Song Method 2.

Halliday released four new songs in December 2017. "Deep State" and "Crashing Cars" can be found on the compilation album The Song Method 3, "Rebel Tattoo" can be found on the compilation album Psychedelic Indie and "Feel the Light" featuring Karen O on backing vocals can be found on the Swagger and Attitude 2 compilation album.

In 2017, Garcia and Halliday contemplated a Curve reunion, but Halliday ultimately decided to decline touring for the moment.

A new song, "Voice of a Girl", was released in May 2019 on the compilation album Female Songwriter for television and film through Universal Music. Halliday co-wrote the song and sang backing vocals with Louise Dowd featuring on lead vocals.

In January 2021, Halliday released the song "Black Crow" on the compilation album The Song System. "Black Crow" was co-written by Dowd. In March 2021, Halliday released a 6-track solo EP called Roll the Dice. She continued to write and record with Dowd.

=== Chatelaine ===
In February 2008, Halliday introduced a new solo project on MySpace called Chatelaine. Chatelaine's debut album Take a Line for a Walk was released in June 2010. It featured nine new tracks: "Broken Bones", "Oh Daddy", "Life Remains", "Stripped Out", "Shifting Sands", "Killing Feeling", "Take a Line for a Walk", "Head to Head" and "Seen and Lost".

=== Retirement ===
In an interview in 2026, she said she "had decided to retire" some years before.

== Personal life ==
Toni Halliday is married to the British record producer Alan Moulder. In 2026, Halliday and Moulder became citizens of Antigua and Barbuda.

== Discography ==
=== The Uncles ===
- What's the Use Of Pretending (3 track EP, 1984)

=== State of Play ===
- Balancing the Scales (1986)

=== Solo ===
==== Studio albums ====
- Hearts and Handshakes (1989)
- For Tomorrow's Sorrows (recorded 2002 with the Prague Philharmonic Orchestra, unreleased)
- Roll the Dice (6 track EP, 2021)

==== Singles ====
- "Weekday"
- "Love Attraction"
- "Time Turns Around"
- "Woman in Mind"

=== Curve ===
- Pubic Fruit (1992)
- Doppelgänger (1992)
- Radio Sessions (1993)
- Cuckoo (1994)
- Come Clean (1998)
- Open Day at the Hate Fest (2001)
- Gift (2001)
- The New Adventures of Curve (2002)
- The Way of Curve (2004)
- Rare and Unreleased (2010)

=== Scylla ===
- Demos (recorded 1995, released 2008)

=== Chatelaine ===
- Take a Line for a Walk (2010)

== Collaborations ==
Halliday provided vocals on the following songs:

Year	Song	Album
1980	Steve Thompson - Looking For Love In A Stranger, I Love Every Moment, Nothing Like The Way We Planned It, Bad News Boy, Paris By Air, Don't Do The Dirty, These Crazy Things	Iron Man Of Norton box set
1983	Bonk – "The Smile and the Kiss"	–
1992	Recoil – "Edge to Life"	Bloodline
1992	Recoil – "Bloodline"	Bloodline
1994	The Future Sound of London – "Cerebral"	Lifeforms
1995	Leftfield – "Original"	Leftism
1995	Freaky Chakra – "Budded on Earth to Bloom in Heaven"	Lowdown Motivator
1998	Freaky Chakra - "Dreams"	"Blacklight Fantasy"
1999	Nine Inch Nails - "The Fragile" additional vocals on the album	
1999	Headcase – "Lola"	Mushiness
2000	DJ? Acucrack – "So to Speak"	Sorted
2000	Bias – "Things That Dreams Are Made Of"	Many Are Called, Few Succeed; Manchester United: Beyond the Promised Land
2003	Acid Android – "Faults"	Faults
2006	The Killers – "A Great Big Sled"	(RED) Christmas EP
2012	Orbital – tracks 1–23	Pusher soundtrack

She also provided backing vocals on the following releases:

- Robert Plant – Shaken 'n' Stirred (1985)
- Robert Plant – Now and Zen (1988)
