= Dean Garcia =

British musician

- Born: 3 May 1958 (age 68); London, England
- Genres: Alternative rock; electronic; shoegaze; dream pop; electronic rock
- Occupation: Musician
- Instruments: Guitar; bass guitar; drums
- Years active: 1980s–present
- Website: deangarcia.bandcamp.com

Dean Garcia (born 3 May 1958) is an English multi-instrumentalist musician, best known as a member of the alternative rock duo Curve from 1990 to 2005. He also released solo work and collaborated with many other artists.

== Biography ==
Garcia was born in London from a Hawaiian, Irish and English background. He had played in some small bands when he auditioned for Eurythmics. He played bass guitar as part of Eurythmics' live band in 1983–84 and on two of their studio albums, Touch and Be Yourself Tonight.

Dean Garcia and Toni Halliday were introduced to each other by Dave Stewart from Eurythmics. The pair formed an ill-fated group named State of Play in the mid-1980s before parting ways, embarking on a no less ill-fated solo career (Halliday) and further stints as a backing musician (Garcia), and then reuniting for a more long-term partnership in Curve. Garcia and Halliday collaborated in Curve between 1990 and 2005. The group's career was interrupted by several periods of inactivity. Garcia played guitar, bass, and drums for Curve, while Halliday sang, wrote the lyrics, and occasionally played guitar.

Outside Curve, Garcia has collaborated with other artists like Eurythmics, Sinéad O'Connor, and Tom Petty, as a session and touring musician. He released "solo" material (Mushiness in 1999 and Crosseyedrabbit in 2003) under the guise of Headcase while still a member of Curve.

Dean Garcia is currently a member of the band SPC ECO with his daughter Rose Berlin and Joey Levenson (2007–present). In February 2009, SPC ECO released their first album, 3-D, through their website and via Collide's label Noiseplus Music. 3-D was followed by the albums You Tell Me in 2011 and Dark Notes in 2012.

Garcia is also member of the bands The Black Holes (with Jo Neale; 2007–present), The Chronologic (2006–present), Inkraktare (with Mark Wallbridge aka Vasko The Pig; 2009–present), The Secret Meeting (with kaRIN and Statik of Collide; 2007–present), KGC (with Sascha Konietzko and Lucia Cifarelli of KMFDM; 2006–present) and Morpheme (2010–present).

Garcia's newest project Morpheme is a collaboration with Perry Pelonero (Clenched Fist, Skylight, Bliss City East), and Kim Welsh (Skylight, Bliss City East). On 8 December 2010, Morpheme released their first track, Infection and on 5 May 2011, they released their second track, Stratosphere on their debut single Infection.

Dean Garcia has also released a solo album on 1 January 2011, entitled How Do You Feel?, with special guests Vasko the Pig, Todd Astromass and Jeff Beck. In June 2011, Garcia signed with XD Records.

== Equipment ==
A detailed gear diagram of Dean Garcia's 2002 Curve bass rig was documented by guitargeek.com. In 2010, he said he used Eventide Ultra-Harmonizer, Akai S1100 samplers, Morley Wah pedal, many delay units and Boss pedals, a Zoom box, Flangers, EQs and a DigiTech.

== Personal life ==
He has two children: Rose Berlin, vocalist of Garcia's band SPC ECO, and Harry Kite Garcia.

== Discography ==
=== State of Play ===
- Balancing the Scales (1986)

=== Curve ===
- Pubic Fruit (1992)
- Doppelgänger (1992)
- Radio Sessions (1993)
- Cuckoo (1993)
- Come Clean (1998)
- Open Day at the Hate Fest (2001)
- Gift (2001)
- The New Adventures of Curve (2002)
- The Way of Curve (2004)
- Rare and Unreleased (2010)

=== Headcase ===
- Mushiness (1999)
- Crosseyedrabbit (2003)

=== The Secret Meeting ===
- Shiver X EP (2007)
- Ultrashiver (2007)
- Shooting Laser Beams (2007)

=== KGC ===
- Dirty Bomb (2006)

=== SPC ECO ===
- 3-D (2009)
- Alternative Mixes and Remixes (2010)
- You Tell Me (2011)
- Dark Notes (2012)

=== as Dean Garcia ===
- How Do You Feel? (2011)
