= Alan Moulder =

English record producer (born 1959)

- Born: 11 June 1959 (age 67); Boston, Lincolnshire, England
- Genre: Alternative rock
- Occupations: Record producer; mixing engineer; audio engineer
- Years active: 1984–present
- Website: alanmoulder.com

Alan Moulder (born 11 June 1959) is an English record producer, mixing engineer, and audio engineer.

== Early life ==
Moulder was born on 11 June 1959 in Boston, Lincolnshire. He was educated at Boston Grammar School. He had an interest in music from an early age, listing Cream and The Beatles among his favourite artists. The first album he bought was Electric Warrior by T. Rex, and he was impressed by the quality of the recording. He joined his first band as a teenager and recorded a demo in a local studio. During this time, he began to take interest in music production.

== Career ==
Moulder's musical career started in the early 1980s at Trident Studios in London. As an assistant engineer, he worked with influential producers like Jean-Michel Jarre, drawing from them great familiarity with electronic sounds and textures. Also an engineer at Trident was Flood with whom Moulder would often collaborate in the future. Moulder assisted in one of Flood's recording sessions with The Jesus and Mary Chain, and found that the often fractious and troublesome band enjoyed working with him. The Mary Chain invited Moulder to engineer their live sounds and, eventually, to engineer their 1989 album Automatic. The album's production was praised for its combination of thick, noisy guitar with a polished, listener-friendly tone, and the Mary Chain's former label, Creation Records, soon had Moulder producing records for Ride, My Bloody Valentine and Swervedriver.

== Selected credits ==
Selected production credits:

- 1987: Figures on a Beach – Standing on Ceremony (engineering, mixing)
- 1988: Gianna Nannini – Malafemmina (producer, mixing)
- 1989: The Jesus and Mary Chain – Automatic (engineering, mixing)
- 1990: My Bloody Valentine – Glider (engineering)
- 1990: Ride – Nowhere (mixing)
- 1991: My Bloody Valentine – Tremolo (engineering)
- 1991: My Bloody Valentine – Loveless (engineering)
- 1992: Curve – Doppelgänger (engineering)
- 1992: Ride – Going Blank Again (producer, mixing)
- 1992: Shakespears Sister – Hormonally Yours (co-producer)
- 1993: The Smashing Pumpkins – Siamese Dream (mixing)
- 1993: Curve – Cuckoo (engineering)
- 1993: Swervedriver – Mezcal Head (producer, mixing)
- 1994: Lush – Split (mixing)
- 1994: Nine Inch Nails – The Downward Spiral (mixing)
- 1994: Marilyn Manson – Portrait of an American Family (engineering, mixing)
- 1995: The Smashing Pumpkins – Mellon Collie and the Infinite Sadness (co-producer, mixing)
- 1995: Prick – Prick (engineering, mixing)
- 1995: Swervedriver – Ejector Seat Reservation (co-producer, mixing)
- 1996: Moby – Animal Rights (engineering, mixing)
- 1996: The Cure – Wild Mood Swings (mixing)
- 1997: U2 – Pop (co-producer, mixing)
- 1997: Depeche Mode – "Useless" (remixing)
- 1998: Monster Magnet – Powertrip (mixing)
- 1999: Nine Inch Nails – The Fragile (co-producer, engineering, mixing)
- 1999: Swervedriver – 99th Dream (co-producer, mixing)
- 2000: The Smashing Pumpkins – Machina/The Machines of God (mixing)
- 2000: A Perfect Circle – Mer de Noms (mixing)
- 2000: Monster Magnet – God Says No
- 2000: Queen Adreena – "Jolene" (co-producer, mixing)
- 2003: Yeah Yeah Yeahs, Fever To Tell (mixing)
- 2003: The Icarus Line – Penance Soiree (co-engineering, mixing)
- 2003: Gary Numan – Hybrid (guest producer)
- 2004: The Killers – Hot Fuss (mixing)
- 2005: Billy Corgan – TheFutureEmbrace (producer)
- 2005: Nine Inch Nails – With Teeth (producer)
- 2005: Soulwax – Any Minute Now (mixing)
- 2006: The Killers – Sam's Town (co-producer)
- 2006: Secret Machines – Ten Silver Drops (mixing)
- 2006: Sound Team – Movie Monster (mixing)
- 2006: Puscifer – V Is for Vagina (mixing)
- 2006: Saul Williams – The Inevitable Rise and Liberation of NiggyTardust! (mixing)
- 2006: Ashes Divide – Keep Telling Myself It's Alright (mixing)
- 2006: The Wolfmen – Debut album (mixing)
- 2006: Blonde Redhead – 23 (producer)
- 2007: Arctic Monkeys – Favourite Worst Nightmare (co-mixing)
- 2007: Korn – Untitled (mixing)
- 2007: Nine Inch Nails – Year Zero (co-mixing)
- 2008: Nine Inch Nails – Ghosts I–IV (co-producer, co-mixing)
- 2008: The Charlatans – You Cross My Path (mixing)
- 2008: Nine Inch Nails – The Slip (co-producer, co-mixing)
- 2008: The Morning After Girls – Alone (producer, mixing)
- 2009: Wolfmother – Cosmic Egg (producer, mixing)
- 2009: Them Crooked Vultures – Them Crooked Vultures (mixing)
- 2009: BM LINX – "Black Entertainment" (mixing)
- 2009: Placebo – Battle for the Sun (mixing)
- 2009: SPC ECO – Shine On Down (remixing)
- 2010: Interpol – Interpol (mixing)
- 2010: How to Destroy Angels – eponymous debut EP (co-producer, co-mixing)
- 2010: Blonde Redhead – Penny Sparkle (co-producer)
- 2011: Foo Fighters – Wasting Light (mixing)
- 2011: White Lies – Ritual (co-producer)
- 2012: How to Destroy Angels – An Omen EP (mixing)
- 2012: The Killers – Battle Born (mixing)
- 2013: Foals – Holy Fire (producer, mixing)
- 2013: How to Destroy Angels – Welcome Oblivion (mixing)
- 2013: Nine Inch Nails – Hesitation Marks (co-producer)
- 2013: The Naked And Famous – Hearts Like Ours (mixing)
- 2014: Howling Bells – Heartstrings (producer)
- 2014: Royal Blood – Royal Blood (mixing)
- 2014: Mercutio – "Back to Nowhere" (mixing)
- 2014: La Roux – Trouble in Paradise (mixing)
- 2014: Interpol – El Pintor (mixing)
- 2015: Foals – What Went Down (mixing)
- 2015: Silversun Pickups – Better Nature (mixing)
- 2015: Editors – In Dream (mixing)
- 2016: The Joy Formidable – Hitch (mixing)
- 2016: Plague Vendor – Blood Sweat (mixing)
- 2016: Bear Hands – You'll Pay for This (mixing)
- 2016: Twin Atlantic – GLA (mixing)
- 2016: Crobot – Welcome to Fat City (mixing)
- 2016: Two Door Cinema Club – Gameshow (mixing)
- 2017: Circa Waves – Different Creatures (producer)
- 2017: Ride – Weather Diaries (mixing)
- 2017: The Killers – Wonderful Wonderful (mixing)
- 2017: Queens of the Stone Age – Villains (mixing)
- 2018: Suede – The Blue Hour (producer, mixing)
- 2018: Beach House – 7 (mixing)
- 2018: Nine Inch Nails – Bad Witch (mixing)
- 2019: Ride – This Is Not a Safe Place (mixing)
- 2019: The Young Gods – Data Mirage Tangram (mixing)
- 2020: 5 Seconds of Summer – No Shame (mixing)
- 2020: EOB – Earth (mixing)
- 2022: Beach House – Once Twice Melody (mixing)
- 2022: Interpol – The Other Side of Make-Believe (mixing)
- 2022: Suede – Autofiction (mixing)
- 2023: Yves Tumor – Praise a Lord Who Chews but Which Does Not Consume; (Or Simply, Hot Between Worlds) (mixing)

== Personal life ==
Moulder is married to the former Curve lead singer Toni Halliday.
