= Anxious Records =

Anxious Records (sometimes typeset as AnXious) was a record label set up by David A. Stewart of Eurythmics, and overseen by Stewart with Infectious Music's Korda Marshall (when Marshall was at BMG/RCA Records). Originally set up as a BMG label, the company went independent when Stewart left RCA Records, with his 1994 Eastwest album Greetings from the Gutter being licensed from Anxious. The label is best known for groups including Londonbeat, Curve and the Dutch band Soft Parade, as well as ex-Specials singer Terry Hall, who was also previously a member of Vegas with Stewart.

== See also ==
- List of record labels
