= List of Christian ska bands =

This is a list of Christian ska bands. Christian ska is a form of Christian alternative rock, and subgenre of ska and ska punk which is lyrically oriented toward contemporary Christian music (CCM) Though ska did not constitute a genre within the Christian music industry until after third wave ska had peaked in the general market, The Encyclopedia of Contemporary Christian Music defines (CCM) as "music that appeals to self-identified fans of contemporary Christian music on account of a perceived connection to what they regard as Christianity". Based on that definition, this list includes artists and bands who perform ska music and work in the Christian music industry as well as artists in the general market whose lyrics reflect their Christian faith or where either the artists themselves or outside sources identify members as performing Christian music.

== Artists ==
- The Deluxtone Rockets
- Denver and the Mile High Orchestra
- The Dingees
- Five Iron Frenzy
- Flight 180
- The Insyderz
- The O.C. Supertones
- Sounds Like Chicken
- Squad Five-O
- The W's
- The Aquabats!

== See also ==
- List of Christian bands and artists by genre
