= Loud and Clear (The O.C. Supertones album) =

Studio album by the O.C. Supertones
- Released: October 10, 2000
- Studios: The Village Recorder, Los Angeles, California
- Genre: Christian ska
- Length: 48:15
- Label: BEC
- Producer: Neill King

The O.C. Supertones chronology
Chase the Sun (1999)	Loud and Clear (2000)	Live! Volume One (2002)

Professional ratings
Review scores
Source	Rating
CCM Magazine	(not rated)
HM	(not rated)
Jesus Freak Hideout	4/5 stars
The Phantom Tollbooth	4/5 stars

Loud and Clear is the fourth studio album released by The O.C. Supertones and features Toby Mac on the song "What It Comes To". This is also the band's first album to include guitarist Ethan Luck. Although Luck was not pictured, he is listed under "additional musicians" in the credits; he did not officially join the band until after the album was finished. Drummer Jason Carson left the band after the release of the album to take a position in youth ministry. However, he returned with the band in 2010 after their hiatus.

Musically the album integrates scratching and hip-hop vocal delivery with their brand of ska. The songwriting was handled primarily by Morginsky and Terusa, and was considered more advanced than on previous albums. Themes range from apologetics to doubting God, but still contain elements of praise and worship and pop culture.

== Track listing ==
All songs written by Matt Morginsky and Tony Terusa, except where noted.

1. "Escape from Reason" - 3:18
2. "What It Comes To" [featuring tobyMac] (Morginsky, Terusa, Toby McKeehan) - 3:39
3. "Jury Duty" - 4:15
4. "Lift Me Up" - 4:36
5. "Return of the Revolution" [featuring Gospel Gangstaz] - 4:26
6. "Wilderness" - 4:14
7. "Father's World" - 3:33
8. "Pandora's Box" - 2:23
9. "Forward to the Future" - 3:56
10. "Another Show" - 2:47
11. "20/20" - 3:54
12. "Who Could It Be" - 2:59
13. "Spend It with You" - 4:23

== Personnel ==
The O.C. Supertones

- Matt Morginsky – vocals
- Tony Terusa – bass
- Jason Carson – drums
- Dan Spencer – trombone
- Darren Mettler – trumpet

Additional musicians

- Phil Parlapiano – keyboards
- Ethan Luck – guitars
- Jung Park – guitars
- Frank Lenz – drums
- Todd Collins – backing vocals (2)
- TobyMac – guest vocals (2)
- Gospel Gangstaz – guest vocals (5)

Production

- Neill King – producer at The Village Recorder, Los Angeles, California, executive producer, recording, mixing at Skip Saylor Recording, Los Angeles, California
- Todd Collins – chorus vocal engineer (2)
- Dan Shike – chorus vocal engineer (2)
- Rene Lopez – assistant engineer
- Regula Merz – assistant engineer
- Jason Wormer – assistant engineer
- Brian Gardner – mastering at Bernie Grundman Mastering (Hollywood, California)
- Suzy "Splab" Hutchinson – design, layout
- Matthew Barnes – photography
