= For the Glory (The O.C. Supertones album) =

Studio album by The O.C. Supertones
- Released: November 6, 2012
- Genre: Christian ska
- Length: 42:37
- Label: BEC
- Producer: Josh Auer

The O.C. Supertones chronology
ReUnite (2010)	For the Glory (2012)	Live Vol. 2 (2017)

For the Glory is the seventh and final studio album by the Christian ska band The O.C. Supertones. It was released on November 6, 2012, eight years after their last studio album, Revenge of The O.C. Supertones. The album featured original members Matt Morginsky, Tony Terusa, Jason Carson and Darren Mettler. The album was crowd-sourced via Kickstarter.

Professional ratings
Review scores
Source	Rating
Christianity Today	2/5 stars
Jesus Freak Hideout	4/5 stars

== Track listing ==
1. "All the Way Alive"
2. "For The Glory"
3. "Hey Hey Hey"
4. "Far More Beautiful"
5. "Down to the River"
6. "All Glory"
7. "It's a Good Day to be From California"
8. "Warmth of the Sun"
9. "On the Downbeat"
10. "Fight On"
11. "Pretty Little Lie"
12. "The Wise and the Fool"
