= Gabriel Wilson =

American singer

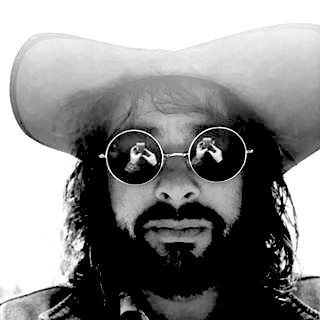
- Gabriel Wilson

Background information
- Born: Gabriel Solomon Wilson; October 7, 1974 (age 52)
- Origin: Portland, Oregon
- Genres: Christian & Gospel, Independent, Singer-Songwriter, Third Space, Worship, Christian rock, folk, indie rock, indie folk, folk rock, roots rock
- Occupations: CEO of RMA, music producer, Singer, songwriter
- Instrument: multi-instrumentalist
- Years active: 1999–present
- Formerly of: Rock n Roll Worship Circus, The Listening, The Violet Burning
- Website: gabrielwilson.com

Gabriel Solomon Wilson (born October 7, 1974) is an American record producer, Christian musician, multi-instrumentalist. Over the course of his music career, Wilson has produced and written on many projects including John Mark McMillan's Mercury & Lightning (Billboard No. 1) and Lindy Conant & The Circuit Riders' Every Nation (Billboard No. 1) Wilson was a member of the Rock n Roll Worship Circus and The Listening, while he has toured with The Violet Burning. He has released two solo studio albums, Lovely Is Death – EP in 2006 and The McGuire Side in 2012.

== Personal life ==
Gabriel resides in the Portland, Oregon area with his wife, Elisa, and their children. He helped found Rogue Music Alliance, an independent record label, with his friend David Staley, in Vancouver, Washington where he is the active CEO of RMA.

== Music history ==
His music career began in 1999 with the Rock n Roll Worship Circus, while he would eventually become a member of The Listening, and a touring member of The Violet Burning. Wilson is a multi-instrumentalist and music producer, having produced multiple albums for Bethel Music. He was nominated for a GMA Dove Award at the 46th GMA Dove Awards in the Worship Song of the Year category, where he was a writer on the song, "Forever (We Sing Hallelujah)", by Kari Jobe.

Wilson released an extended play, Lovely Is Death, on December 10, 2006, with L-Town Records. He subsequently released a studio album, The McGuire Side, named after his father's side of the family, was independently released, on September 18, 2012.

== Discography ==
Personal Projects
Album	Artist/Band	Year	Genre	Label
Chi Ro	TheHarlotDance	1997	Art Rock	Independent
When Fancy Was	Streetlight Fancies	1998	Art Rock	Independent
Live at Tomfest	Rock n Roll Worship Circus	1999	Christian & Gospel	Independent
Little Star Logistics	Rock n Roll Worship Circus	2000	Christian & Gospel	Independent
Big Star Logistics	Rock n Roll Worship Circus	2001	Christian & Gospel	Independent
Welcome to the Rock 'n' Roll Worship Circus	Rock n Roll Worship Circus	2002	Christian & Gospel	Vertical/Integrity
A Beautiful Glow	Rock n Roll Worship Circus	2003	Christian & Gospel	INO/Integrity
The Listening EP	The Listening	2004	Third Space	Independent, Fierce UK
The Listening LP	The Listening	2005	Third Space	Independent
Transmission 1 EP	The Listening	2008	Third Space	Independent
Lovely Is Death – EP	Gabriel Wilson	2006	Singer-Songwriter	Independent
The McGuire Side	Gabriel Wilson	2012	Singer-Songwriter	Independent

Produced by Gabriel Wilson
Album	Artist/Band	Year	Genre	Label
Live at Tomfest	Rock n Roll Worship Circus	1999	Christian & Gospel	Independent
Little Star Logistics	Rock n Roll Worship Circus	2000	Christian & Gospel	Independent
Fashion Over Function	The Deadlines	2001	Christian & Gospel	Tooth & Nail Records /CCMG
Big Star Logistics	Rock n Roll Worship Circus	2001	Christian & Gospel	Independent
Welcome to the Rock 'n' Roll Worship Circus	Rock n Roll Worship Circus	2002	Christian & Gospel	Vertical / Integrity Music
Six Inches of Sky	Sherri Youngward	2002	Christian & Gospel	Catapult
A Beautiful Glow	Rock n Roll Worship Circus	2003	Christian & Gospel	INO Records / Integrity Music
Alive in the Fall	Jason Harwell	2004	Rock	Independent
Time & Space	Soular	2004	Rock	Astonish Entertainment
The Listening EP – EP	The Listening	2004	Third Space	Independent / Fierce UK
The Listening LP	The Listening	2005	Third Space	Independent
Lovely Is Death – EP	Gabriel Wilson	2006	Singer-Songwriter	Independent
Well Behaved & Working for You	Whitfield	2006	Pop	Independent
Drop-Dead	The Violet Burning	2006	Alternative	Northern Records
Colors and Sound	Article One	2007	Rock	Independent / Inpop Records
Transmission 1 – EP	The Listening	2008	Third Space	Independent
Tornado Cutie	Whitfield	2009	Pop	Independent
God Who Saves the World	Lakeside Church	2010	Christian & Gospel	Independent
The McGuire Side	Gabriel Wilson	2012	Singer-Songwriter	Independent
Stars – Single	The Repair	2012	Alternative	Independent
Run the Red Light	Run the Red Light	2012	Rock	Independent
Letting Go – EP	Amy Renée	2013	Singer-Songwriter	Independent
Without Words	Bethel Music	2013	Christian & Gospel	Bethel Music
Tides	Bethel Music	2013	Christian & Gospel	Bethel Music
Seek You First – EP	Jordan & Kristin Rippy	2014	Christian & Gospel	Independent
Swan Song – EP	Hunter G K Thompson	2014	Christian & Gospel	Bethel Music
You Make Me Brave	Bethel Music	2014	Christian & Gospel	Bethel Music
Bone by Bone	The Bright Expression	2015	Christian & Gospel	Independent
We Are One	First Assembly Music	2015	Christian & Gospel	Independent
This Is My Song	Jonny & Bryar Strutt	2015	Christian & Gospel	Independent
Our God & Our King	NLC Worship	2015	Christian & Gospel	Independent
Solo Queremos Amarte	Jaz Jacob	2015	Christian & Gospel	Independent
Heartache and a Song	Renn	2015	Singer-Songwriter	Independent
Savior's Vine	Trinity Fellowship Church	2016	Christian & Gospel	Independent
Zieh Du ii	Columbus	2016	German Pop	Independent
I Am Home	CityWorship	2016	Christian & Gospel	Independent
Chapter Two: Flux – EP	KXC	2016	Christian & Gospel	Independent
Every Nation	Lindy Conant & The Circuit Riders	2016	Christian & Gospel	Independent / RMA
Revealed	Ty & Daneen Bottler	2016	Christian & Gospel	Independent
When Lands Are Golden – EP	LaPeer	2016	Singer-Songwriter	Independent
In Blistering Cold – EP	LaPeer	2017	Singer-Songwriter	Independent
To Brighter Dawns – EP	LaPeer	2017	Singer-Songwriter	Independent
Mercury & Lightning	John Mark McMillan	2017	Singer-Songwriter	Lionhawk Records / RMA
Fearless – EP	Eric & Shala	2017	Christian & Gospel	Independent
'90s Kids	LaPeer	2018	Singer-Songwriter	Independent
Refuge – EP	Matthew James Mason	2018	Christian & Gospel	Independent
You're the Wine – EP	Brandon Richardson	2018	Christian & Gospel	Furnace Music / Watershed Music Group
Touching Heaven	Influence Music	2018	Christian & Gospel	Influence Music
Iron Lung	Martin Smith	2019	Christian & Gospel	Integrity Music
AGES	Influence Music	2021	Christian & Gospel	Influence Music
Fully Alive	Future Divine	2021	Christian & Gospel	Community Christian Music
Reconnect	Sarah Lorente	2021	Alternative	Independent
PENNELL	PENNELL	2021	Christian & Gospel	Firebrand Records / Maranatha! Music
Before the Breakthrough	Influence Music	2022	Christian & Gospel	Influence Music
Welcome Home	The Altar Music	2022	Christian & Gospel	The Altar Music
David (Original Cast Recording)	Sight & Sound Theatres	2022	Soundtrack	Sight & Sound Theatres
Long Live The King	Influence Music	2023	Christian & Gospel	Influence Music
Day & Night	Influence Music	2024	Christian & Gospel	Influence Music
Daniel (Original Cast Recording)	Sight & Sound Theatres	2024	Soundtrack	Sight & Sound Theatres
Timeless	The Altar Music	2025	Christian & Gospel	The Altar Music
Cosmic Supreme	John Mark McMillan	2025	Christian & Gospel	Anotherland
Cathedral – EP	Cageless Birds, Jonathan David Helser, Melissa Helser	2025	Christian & Gospel	Independent

Singles

Title	Artist/Band	Year	Genre	Label
Mistakes (Live/Extended)	Influence Music, Melody Noel	2018	Christian & Gospel	Influence Music
Go F**k Yourself	Kurt Van Meter	2022	Country	Mustang Ridge Records
Echoes of the Outlaws	Kurt Van Meter	2022	Country	Mustang Ridge Records
Coming Awake	Influence Music, Sean Feucht	2022	Christian & Gospel	Influence Music
My Heart Wants You	Mountain People Worship	2023	Christian & Gospel	Independent
Birds and Beasts	Mountain People Worship	2023	Christian & Gospel	Independent
Let It Fall Here	Mountain People Worship	2023	Christian & Gospel	Independent
Where I Hide	Mountain People Worship	2023	Christian & Gospel	Independent
Lion and Lamb	Mountain People Worship	2024	Christian & Gospel	Independent
Baptize Me	Kurt Van Meter	2024	Country	Mustang Ridge Records
Cowboy Grit	Kurt Van Meter	2024	Country	Mustang Ridge Records
Every Bone (Live on a Dirt Floor)	Mountain People Worship, Josh Baldwin	2025	Christian & Gospel	Independent / Integrated Music Rights
Deixa a Glória Vir	Mountain People Worship, Rodolfo Abrantes	2025	Christian & Gospel	Independent / Integrated Music Rights
