= Matt Gilman =

American Christian musician (born 1985)

- Born: Matthew Thomas Gilman; July 15, 1985 (age 41); Minneapolis, Minnesota, U.S.
- Origin: Orlando, Florida
- Genres: CCM, worship
- Occupations: Singer, songwriter
- Instruments: Vocals, singer-songwriter
- Years active: 2008–present
- Label: Forerunner
- Website: mattgilman.com

Matthew Thomas "Matt" Gilman (born July 15, 1985) is an American Christian musician. His first release was with Forerunner Music in 2008, Holy. A second album, Awaken Love, with Cory Asbury was released in 2013 by Forerunner Music. The album was Gilman's breakthrough release on the Billboard Top Christian Albums and Heatseekers albums charts. He leads worship with Influence Music, who are based at Influence Church in Anaheim Hills, California.

== Early life ==
Gilman was born on July 15, 1985 in Minneapolis, Minnesota to a Lutheran preacher father, Thomas Richard Gilman, and mother, Patricia Lynn Monnier. Matthew began to study music at 8; he started leading worship services at his father's church when he was 14 years old. He graduated high school in 2002 and then moved to Kansas City, Missouri, to join the International House of Prayer. He was based there for a decade until he left in 2012.

== Personal life ==
Matthew Gilman and his wife, Alexia, have twin sons, Isaac and Caden. He lives in Orlando, Florida and travels monthly to Influence Church to lead worship.

== Music career ==
Gilman's music career commenced in 2008, with the co-released album, Holy, with Cory Asbury; it was released by Forerunner Music on July 10, 2008. His second album, Awaken Love, was released on August 27, 2013, by Forerunner Music. The album was his breakthrough release upon the Billboard magazine charts, where it was No. 19 on the Christian Albums chart and reached No. 8 on the Heatseekers Albums chart. Gilman is part of an artist collective known as Influence Music, which was birthed out of Influence Church in Anaheim Hills. influencemusicofficial.com

Gilman has been leading worship since the age of 14, having grown up in ministry with his father, a Lutheran pastor. In 2002, when Matthew was a senior in high school, he went to the International House of Prayer of Kansas City thinking he was just attending a conference about music, his favorite subject. He said, "As soon as I walked into the building, I knew this was different. It was not at all what I was expecting. God began to shake me to the core as He opened up a whole new understanding of worship with the Word of God. I knew right away this is what I was made for." After being a worship leader for ten years at the International House of Prayer, Gilman took a position with the Orlando House of Prayer. As an artist, Gilman has over 27,000 monthly listeners on Spotify and averages 300,000 plays per track. In January 2017, Gilman was a guest speaker at Influence Church in Anaheim Hills and led worship. He has traveled to Anaheim once a month to lead worship and co-write with the team. Gilman said, "Influence Church is a body of believers that truly acts as the hands and feet of Jesus. It has been a place of deep healing, refreshing, restoration and musical inspiration for me. I’m so honored to get to run with such an amazing and authentic group of people that I get to call my family."

== Discography ==
=== Studio albums ===
List of studio albums, with selected chart positions
Title	Album details	Peak chart positions	
Title	Album details	US Christ	US Heat
Holy (with Cory Asbury)	Released: July 10, 2008; Label: Forerunner; CD, digital download	—	—
Awaken Love	Released: August 27, 2013; Label: Forerunner; CD, digital download	19	8
