= Supertones Strike Back =

Studio album by the O.C. Supertones
- Released: June 3, 1997
- Recorded: West Beach Studios, Hollywood, CA
- Genre: Christian ska
- Length: 41:28
- Label: BEC
- Producer: Steve Kravac

The O.C. Supertones chronology
Adventures of the O.C. Supertones (1996)	Supertones Strike Back (1997)	Chase the Sun (1999)

Professional ratings
Review scores
Source	Rating
7ball	
Church Musician Today	
Jesus Freak Hideout	4.5/5 stars
The Phantom Tollbooth	4/5 stars
YouthWorker	

Supertones Strike Back is the second studio album released by the O.C. Supertones. One reviewer described the album as a "no-hold-barred modern day revival meeting".

Compared to the bands' debut, this release features a refined sound. Attributed to experience and having spent almost three months on production, vocalist Matt Morginsky joked that "we play in tempo and in tune on this one!" The music contains harder guitars and begins to show diverse influences, like surf and R&B.

== Reception ==
The Los Angeles Times described the album as passionate, saying that "what they offer, in song after ska-punk song, is complete, full-hearted conviction". Going on to say that the album stood as an example and reproach to the trendy but superficial Orange County ska movement. John DiBiase of Jesus Freak Hideout described the album as more aggressive than their previous album, with louder and harder guitar and moody vocals; praising it as one of the best ska albums available.

== Track listing ==
1. "Supertones Strike Back"
2. "Grace Flood"
3. "Resolution"
4. "Perseverance of the Saints"
5. "Like No One Else"
6. "Louder Than the Mob"
7. "Unite"
8. "Shut up & Play"
9. "Tonight"
10. "Little Man"
11. "Caught Inside"
12. "So Great a Salvation"

== Personnel ==
- Matt "Mojo" Morginsky – lead vocals
- Jason "Kid" Carson – drums
- Tony "Toneman" Terusa – bass guitar
- Darren "Chief" Mettler – trumpet
- Daniel "Mad-dog" Spencer – trombone, rap vocals on Little Man
- Kevin "Slim" Chen – guitars
- Dave Chevalier – saxophone, rap vocals on Little Man

Additional musicians

- Andy Kaulkin – Hammond organ
