= Faith of a Child =

Studio album by the O.C. Supertones
- Released: 2005
- Genre: Christian ska
- Length: 42:49
- Label: BEC

The O.C. Supertones chronology
Unite (2005)	Faith of a Child (2005)	The Ultimate Collection (2008)

Faith of a Child is the ninth CD released by the O.C. Supertones. The first five tracks are unreleased worship recordings, while the remainder of the album consists of previously released material. This was the first album to be recorded back in California since Loud and Clear.

Professional ratings
Review scores
Source	Rating
Jesus Freak Hideout	3/5 stars
The Phantom Tollbooth	1.5/5 stars

== Track listing ==
1. "Come Thou Fount" – 2:55
2. "Remember" – 3:48
3. "How Deep the Father's Love" – 3:18
4. "Here I Am to Worship" – 3:47
5. "Blessed Assurance" – 3:15
6. "Shepherd is the Lamb" – 4:39
7. "Faith of a Child" – 3:38
8. "Louder Than the Mob" (new recording in a reggae groove)– 4:51
9. "Hold On to Jesus" (new recording with piano)– 3:44
10. "Away from You" (from Live! Volume One) – 5:05
11. "Hallelujah" – 3:41
