= Hi-Fi Revival =

Studio album by The O.C. Supertones
- Released: October 22, 2002
- Recorded: Nashville, Tennessee
- Genre: Christian ska
- Length: 44:25
- Label: Tooth & Nail
- Producer: Brent Bourgeois, Charlie Peacock

The O.C. Supertones chronology
Live! Volume One (2002)	Hi-Fi Revival (2002)	Revenge of the O.C. Supertones (2004)

Professional ratings
Review scores
Source	Rating
AllMusic	3/5 stars
CCM Magazine	(not rated)
Jesus Freak Hideout	CD; DVD

Hi-Fi Revival is the fifth studio album released by The O.C. Supertones. It was the first of three sessions the Supertones recorded in Franklin, Tennessee at Dark Horse Studios. Matt Morginsky and Ethan Luck lived together at this time and demoed over 50 songs for Hi-Fi Revival in their basement. 17 of the un-used songs made it on to their side-project album, Grand Incredible. The rest of the demos were never released. CCM characterized the sound on this album as displaying stripped down ska core rhythms, with the horn section now "providing color instead of the dominant sound."

== Track listing ==
1. "Superfly"
2. "Brand New Thing"
3. "Welcome Home"
4. "Hold on to Jesus"
5. "Go Go Go"
6. "Let It Go"
7. "Just a Man"
8. "Attitude"
9. "Perfect Love"
10. "Fire"
11. "Birth of Uncool"
12. "Go Your Way"
13. "Radio Plays"
14. "Forever"
15. "Glory Hallelujah"

== Personnel ==
- Matt "Mojo" Morginsky – lead vocals
- Ethan Luck – guitars
- Tony Terusa – bass guitar
- John Wilson – drums
- Darren Mettler – trumpet
- Daniel Spencer – trombone
