= Chase the Sun (The O.C. Supertones album) =

1999 studio album by The O.C. Supertones

Studio album by The O.C. Supertones
- Released: February 23, 1999
- Studios: Sound City Studios, Los Angeles, California
- Genre: Christian ska
- Length: 48:22
- Label: BEC
- Producer: Garth "GGGarth" Richardson

The O.C. Supertones chronology
Supertones Strike Back (1997)	Chase the Sun (1999)	Loud and Clear (2000)

Professional ratings
Review scores
Source	Rating
Jesus Freak Hideout	3.5/5 stars
The Phantom Tollbooth	3/5 stars
HM Magazine	(not rated)
Christian Music	(not rated)
Cornerstone	(not rated)
YouthWorker	(not rated)

Chase the Sun is the third album released by The O.C. Supertones. This is the only album to include Brian Johnson, whose spot was filled by Ethan Luck.

== Track listing ==
Lyrics by Matt Morginsky except where noted. Music by Matt Morginsky, Tony Terusa and the O.C. Supertones except where noted.

1. "One Voice" - 2:57
2. "Hallelujah" (lyrics and music: Frederick Hibbert) - 3:40
3. "In Between" - 3:07
4. "Away from You" featuring Crystal Lewis - 4:39
5. "Dedication" - 3:59
6. "Grounded" - 3:44
7. "Sure Shot" - 2:46
8. "Old Friend" (lyrics: Darren Mettler, Tony Terusa) - 3:31
9. "Chase the Sun" - 2:51
10. "Fade Away" - 4:16
11. "Hanani" - 3:59
12. "Revolution" [instrumental] - 3:20
13. "Health and Wealth" - 3:31
14. "Refuge" (in conclusion) - 2:01

== Personnel ==
The O.C. Supertones

- Matt "Mojo" Morginsky – lead vocals, arrangements
- Brian Johnson – guitars, arrangements
- Tony Terusa – bass, arrangements
- Jason Carson – drums
- Daniel Spencer – trombone
- Darren Mettler – trumpet

Additional musicians

- Andrew Degrasse – keyboards, backing vocals
- John Nau – keyboards
- Andrew Bray – guitars, backing vocals
- Frank Lenz – drums
- Chris Trujillo – percussion
- Dave Chevalier – saxophones, backing vocals
- Finn Manniche – cello
- Mellow D – backing vocals
- Crystal Lewis – harmony vocals (4)
- The Gospel Singers (Benita Brisco, Mirata Dias and Jimmy Fisher) – backing vocals

Production

- Garth "Gggarth" Richardson – producer
- Brandon Ebel – executive producer
- Darren Grahn – engineer at Sound City Studios, Los Angeles, California
- Nick Raskulinecz – recording assistant
- Jim Rondonelli – mixing at The Warehouse Studio, Vancouver, Canada
- Dean Maher – mix assistant
- Greg Calbi – mastering at Sterling Sound, New York City
- Suzy Hutchinson – art direction
- Barry E. Eames – design
- Chisae Shinomiya – design
- Vern Evans – photography
- Anthony Saint James – photography
