= Unite (The O.C. Supertones album) =

Compilation album by The O.C. Supertones
- Released: January 25, 2005
- Genre: Christian ska
- Length: 69:59
- Label: Tooth & Nail

The O.C. Supertones chronology
Revenge of The O.C. Supertones (2004)	Unite (2005)	Faith of a Child (2005)

Professional ratings
Review scores
Source	Rating
Jesus Freak Hideout	3.5/5 stars

Unite is The O.C. Supertones' eighth album. It is a collection of hits from throughout the band's career. The band entered the studio for the last time to take part in this best of collection. They intended to record some new songs for the collection, but due to heavy touring, the band could not finish the new songs. As a result, the band re-recorded some old songs instead. In addition to the songs included on the release, the band also recorded a new version of "Hold Onto Jesus" and a reggae version of "Louder Than the Mob" for their worship collection, "Faith of a Child". "Grounded", "Strike Back", and "Unite" were also recorded, but were never released.

== Track listing ==
1. "Supertones Strike Back" (Supertones Strike Back)
2. "Unite" (Supertones Strike Back)
3. "Adonai (New Recording)" (Adventures of the O.C. Supertones)
4. "Away from You" (Chase the Sun)
5. "Return Of The Revolution" (Loud and Clear)
6. "Who Can Be Against Me?" (Adventures of the O.C. Supertones)
7. "Little Man" (Supertones Strike Back)
8. "Grounded" (Chase the Sun)
9. "Old Friend" (Chase the Sun)
10. "What It Comes To" (Loud and Clear)
11. "Resolution" (Supertones Strike Back)
12. "OC Supertones (New Recording)" (Adventures of the O.C. Supertones)
13. "Superfly" (Hi-Fi Revival)
14. "We Shall Overcome" (Revenge of the O.C. Supertones)
15. "Welcome Home" (Hi-Fi Revival)
16. "Jury Duty" (Loud and Clear)
17. "Chase the Sun" (Chase the Sun)
18. "Prince of Peace" (Revenge of the O.C. Supertones)
19. "Unknown" (Adventures of the O.C. Supertones)
20. "Wilderness" (Loud and Clear)

== Personal ==
Players

- Matt Morginsky – vocals
- Dan Spencer – trombone
- Ethan Luck – guitar
- John Wilson – drums
- Chris Beaty – bass
- Bret Barker – trumpet

Additional musicians

- John Davis – keys and bgvs
