= Paradise (The Insyderz EP) =

EP by The Insyderz
- Released: 1998
- Genre: Christian ska
- Label: KMG Records

The Insyderz chronology
Skalleluia! (1998)	Paradise (1998)	Fight of My Life (1998)

Professional ratings
Review scores
Source	Rating
HM	not rated

Paradise is the third release by the Christian third-wave ska band the Insyderz. Released in 1998, it is the band's only EP. The song "Our Wars" contains numerous references to Star Wars, and "Just What I Needed" is a cover of the Cars song.

== Track listing ==
1. "Paradise"
2. "Our Wars"
3. "Just What I Needed"
4. "Our Wars" (Dark Fader mix)
5. "Paradise" (Karaoke mix)
