= Awaken Love =

Studio album by Matt Gilman
- Released: August 27, 2013
- Genre: Contemporary Christian music, worship
- Length: 55:00
- Label: Forerunner
- Producer: Ed Cash

Matt Gilman chronology
Holy (2008)	Awaken Love (2013)

Awaken Love is the second studio album by Matt Gilman. Forerunner Music released the album on August 27, 2013. Gilman worked with Ed Cash in the production of this album.

== Critical reception ==
Professional ratings
Review scores
Source	Rating
All about Worship	4/5 stars
CCM Magazine	3/5 stars
Cross Rhythms	8/10 squares

Awarding the album three stars for CCM Magazine, Matt Conner states, "it’s the worship leader’s incredible voice that tops the list." Mike Rimmer, rating the album an eight out of ten for Cross Rhythms, writes, "It's intimate worship ballads and anthems all the way here and I think I like it best when Matt chooses to go in an intense direction." Giving the album four stars at All about Worship, Mathew Reames describes, "This entire album is filled with songs that will bless you and your congregation."

== Track listing ==
No.	Title	Writer(s)	Length
1.	"As the Deer"	Matt Gilman, Jordan Sarmiento, James Wells, David Whitworth, Seth Yates	4:43
2.	"This Is My Beloved"	Gilman	4:59
3.	"Eyes of Mercy"	Ed Cash, Gilman, Cody Norris	4:06
4.	"Holy"	Gilman, Mindy Hurdelbrink, Yates	4:54
5.	"You Made a Way"	Gilman	5:17
6.	"Awaken Love"	Natasha Downs, Alexia Gilman, Matt Gilman, Sarmiento	4:47
7.	"Though You Were Rich"	Gilman, Sarmiento	4:50
8.	"Every Captive Free"	Gilman	6:14
9.	"New Jerusalem"	A. Gilman, Gilman	6:34
10.	"Fairer"	Cash, Gilman	3:40
11.	"Closer"	Gilman	4:56
Total length:			55:00

== Charts ==
Chart (2013)	Peak position
US Christian Albums (Billboard)	19
US Heatseekers Albums (Billboard)	8
