= Adventures of The O.C. Supertones =

Adventures of the O.C. Supertones

Studio album by The O.C. Supertones
- Released: April 24, 1996
- Genre: Christian ska
- Length: 36:58
- Label: Tooth & Nail

The O.C. Supertones chronology
Adventures of the O.C. Supertones (1996)	Supertones Strike Back (1997)

Professional ratings
Review scores
Source	Rating
Jesus Freak Hideout	4/5 stars
Cornerstone	
CCM Magazine	

Adventures of the O.C. Supertones is the first album released by The O.C. Supertones. Its lyrical content is mostly simple and spiritual, similar to worship music. Cornerstone reviewer Don Hill stated that its simplicity was similar to that of the song "Father Abraham", designed to "draw you out of yourself and into the presence of God like a small child." Some exceptions are "Blood Washed Pilgrim" which contains direct theology, and "Found" which references Saul's conversion to explain the purpose of the band. In the words of the band this is "Preach the Gospel, reach your heart, and ska, ska, ska, ska!" "OC Supertones" continues the explanations, stating their stance on the church and some of the band's background. Musically the album contains simple guitar supported by horns, with splashes of reggae, alternative rock, and rap. The latter elements would become more prevalent later in the band's later releases. The album's first track, in its intro, features a distinct similarity to Metallica's version of the Diamond Head (band) track Am I Evil? released on their 1980 debut album Lightning to the Nations

The dialogue introduction for "Found" is from Back to the Future, when Doc Brown realizes the Libyans have found him.

Production of the album took about ten days in the studio.

== Track listing ==
1. "Adonai" – 3:27
2. "Who Can Be Against Me" – 3:09
3. "Unknown" – 3:17
4. "Never Wanna Fall" – 2:59
5. "Roots" – 2:25
6. "Heaven" – 1:50
7. "He Will Always Be There" – 4:16
8. "Exalt" – 2:57
9. "Found" – 3:29
10. "O.C. Supertones" – 3:07
11. "I Love God" – 2:36
12. "Blood Washed Pilgrim" – 3:27

== Personnel ==
- Matt "Mojo" Morginsky: Lead Vocals, Guitar
- Jason "Kid" Carson: Drums
- Tony "Toneman" Terusa: Bass Guitar
- Darren "Chief" Mettler: Trumpet
- Kevin "Slim" Chen: Guitar (credited, did not play on album)
- Dave Chevalier: Tenor Saxophone

== Additional Personnel ==
- Paul Clark: Alto Saxophone
- Matt "Pegleg" Roberts: Vocals on "OC Supertones"
- Destiny Sanchez: Vocals on "Exalt" and "Blood Washed Pilgrim"
