= The Ultimate Collection (The O.C. Supertones album) =

Greatest hits album by the O.C. Supertones
- Released: March 11, 2008
- Recorded: 1996–2005
- Genre: Christian ska
- Label: Tooth & Nail

The O.C. Supertones chronology
Faith of a Child (2005)	The Ultimate Collection (2008)	ReUnite (2010)

Professional ratings
Review scores
Source	Rating
Jesus Freak Hideout	3.5/5 stars

The Ultimate Collection is the tenth album released by the O.C. Supertones. This was a two disc set.

== Track listing ==
Disc One

1. "Supertones Strike Back"
2. "Unite"
3. "Away from You"
4. "O.C. Supertones"
5. "Little Man"
6. "Who Can Be Against Me"
7. "Adonai"
8. "Resolution"
9. "Hold On to Jesus"
10. "Grounded"
11. "Wilderness"

Disc two

1. "What It Comes To"
2. "Unknown"
3. "Hallelujah"
4. "Louder Than the Mob"
5. "Jury Duty"
6. "Welcome Home"
7. "Sure Shot"
8. "Chase the Sun"
9. "Go, Go, Go"
10. "Grace Flood"
