= Skalleluia Too! =

Studio album by The Insyderz
- Released: October 26, 1999
- Genre: Christian ska
- Length: 64:13
- Label: KMG
- Producer: Gene Eugene

The Insyderz chronology
Fight of My Life (1998)	Skalleluia Too! (1999)	The Greatest and Rarest (2001)

Professional ratings
Review scores
Source	Rating
Billboard	not rated
CCM Magazine	not rated
HM	not rated
Jesus Freak Hideout	3/5 stars

Skalleluia Too! is the fourth full-length album by the Christian ska band, The Insyderz. Released on 26 October 1999, it is the second of their albums dedicated to ska renditions of worship songs. It offers a greater variety of musical influences when compared to Skalleluia!.

== Track listing ==
Skalleluia Too! track listing
No.	Title	Writer(s)	Length
1.	"Peace of God"	Darlene Zschech
2.	"When I Look Up"	Joe Yerke
3.	"I Could Sing of Your Love Forever"	Martin Smith
4.	"Shout to the Lord"	Darlene Zschech
5.	"Who Is This"	Helen & Michael Frye
6.	"True of You"	Tommy Walker
7.	"All That I Am"	William Himes
8.	"Old Rugged Cross"	George Bennard
9.	"In the Secret"	Andy Park
10.	"Psalm 121 (I Lift My Eyes Up)"	Brian Doerksen
11.	"Psalm 139"
12.	"Steadfast Love"	Edith McNeill
13.	"Step By Step"	David Beaker
14.	"Pour Out My Heart"	Craig Musseau

== Personnel ==
- Joe Yerke – lead vocals
- Kyle Wasil – lead guitar
- Beau McCarthy – bass guitar
- Nate Sjogren – drums, percussion, vibraphone, vocals
- Bram Roberts – trumpet
- Chris Colonnier – trombone

Additional musicians

- Melissa Hasin – cello
- Doug Webb – saxophone
- Chris Rush – trumpet
- Corey Gemme – cornet
