= Lord, I Lift Your Name on High =

Song
- Released: 1989
- Genre: Contemporary worship music
- Songwriter: Rick Founds

"Lord, I Lift Your Name on High" is a worship song written by Rick Founds in 1989.

Founds wrote the song during his morning devotion, while reading the scriptures on his computer monitor and watching television. He plucked his guitar thinking about the "cycle of redemption", comparing it with the water cycle.

You came from heaven to earth, to show the way
From the earth to the cross, my debt to pay
From the cross to the grave, from the grave to the sky
Lord I lift your name on high

Founds performed the song as a worship leader in his church. It was picked up by Maranatha! Music and initially recorded by the Maranatha! Singers followed by the Praise Band. Promise Keepers performed the song in English and Spanish in their drives.

Since the 1990s, it has been one of the most popular Christian songs. In the United States, Christian Copyright Licensing International (CCLI) reported Lord I Lift Your Name on High as the most popular song used in churches every year from 1997 to 2003. Currently it is No. 24 on the list. CCLI UK report it as the fifth most popular printed, projected or recorded song in mid-2006. In Australia this song was the seventh most used song by the beginning of 2007

There have been many interpretations of the song by many artists in all styles: gospel, R&B, soul, rock, dance, reggae, hip hop, rap, soca, ska, punk, a cappella amongst others and has been translated to a number of languages and recorded in a number of countries.

== Versions ==
- In 1989, the first recorded version was by the Maranatha! Singers on the label Maranatha! Music. The recording was done on the album Double Praise 12 of the Praise series and was released on the Maranatha! Music and distributed by WORD Inc. The recording was done in classic style.
- In 1992 Paul Baloche performed the song on his Album He Is Faithful, published by Hosanna! Music
- In 1997, Christian band Petra on their album Petra Praise 2: We Need Jesus
- In 1998, Christian ska-punk band The Insyderz on their album Skalleluia!
- In 1999, Christian singer Carman on his album Passion for Praise, Vol. 1
- In 2000, American Christian singer Lincoln Brewster on his album Live to Worship
- In 2000, American Gospel singer and composer Donnie McClurkin on his album Live in London and More...
- In 2001, Christian Contemporary band SONICFLOOd released a live rock version of the song on their album Sonicpraise. It was recorded in 1999 during the Flevo Festival
- In 2004, South African-UK musician and singer Jonathan Butler released a soul cover version on his worship album "The Worship Project."
- In 2005, the Christian pop group Worship Jamz recorded a pop version in their self-titled album Worship Jamz
- It has also been covered by Jamaican singer Chevelle Franklyn.
- In 2009, Coffey Anderson performed the song on his album Worship Unplugged Vol. 1
- In 2025, Marvin Winans performed the song on Justin Bieber's album Swag, under the title "Forgiveness".

Language versions

- In 2005, the song was done as "Yo Wuti" in Lingala by the Dutch-Congolese band Makoma. It appeared on the Makoma album Na Nzambe Te, Bomoyi Te (also known as No Jesus, No Life).
- The song was also translated into:
  - Czech – "Tvoje jméno vyznávám" (I profess Your name)
  - Cantonese - "讓我高舉頌讚祢" (May I Lift and Praise You)
  - Dutch – "Heer, ik prijs uw grote naam" (Lord, I praise Your great name)
  - Finnish – "Herra sua mä korotan" (Lord, I exalt You)
  - French – "Je loue ton nom, Eternel" (I praise your name, Eternal One)
  - German – "Herr, dein Name sei erhöht" (Lord, Your name be exalted)
  - Portuguese – "O Teu nome exaltarei" (I will exalt your name)
  - Korean – "주의 이름 높이며" (As I Lift Lord's name)
  - Malayalam – "Yeshu naamathe uyarthidam" (Let us lift Jesus' name)
  - Norwegian – "Gud, jeg opphøyer ditt navn" (God, I exalt your name)
  - Polish – "Chcę wywyższać Imię Twe" (I want to exalt Thy name)
  - Slovenian – "Povzdigujem tvoje ime" (I elevate your name)
  - Spanish – "Tu Nombre Levantaré" (I will Lift your name On High)
  - Swedish – "Gud jag lyfter upp ditt namn" (God I lift up your name)
  - Mongolian "Эзэний нэрийг дээдэлье" (Let's praise the name of Lord)
  - There are also versions in Chinese, Japanese, Hmong, Tamil and Turkish.
