= Skalleluia! =

Studio album by The Insyderz
- Released: 1998
- Genre: Christian ska
- Label: Squint Entertainment
- Producer: Gene Eugene

The Insyderz chronology
Motor City Ska (1997)	Skalleluia! (1998)	Paradise CD Single (2001)

Professional ratings
Review scores
Source	Rating
HM link	
Seven Ball Magazine	
Fishbowl Online	
The Phantom Tollbooth	3.5/5 stars
Cross Rhythms	8/10 stars
Cool Fools	
CCM Magazine	
YouthWorker	

Skalleluia!, also called The Insyderz Present Skalleluia!, is the second album by the Christian third-wave ska band, The Insyderz. Released 5 May 1998, it is the first of their albums dedicated to ska renditions of worship songs. The album was an unexpected success for the band, which had been reluctant to record an album of praise and worship music despite their own background with the genre.

The album charted on the Billboard 200, the Heatseekers, and Top Contemporary Christian Albums charts at 200, 15, and 8, respectively. Their cover of Rich Mullins' song "Awesome God" won the band a Dove Award for Hard Music Recorded Song of the Year in 1999.

== Track listing ==
No.	Title	Writer(s)	Length
1.	"Oh, Lord, You're Beautiful"	Keith Green
2.	"He Has Made Me Glad"	Leona Von Brethorst
3.	"Awesome God"	Rich Mullins, Joe Yerke
4.	"Lord, I Lift Your Name on High"	Rick Founds
5.	"Jesus, Draw Me Close"	Rick Founds
6.	"Ancient of Days"	Jamie Harvill, Gary Sadler
7.	"You Are My All in All"	Dennis Jernigan
8.	"Jesus, Name Above All Names / More Precious Than Silver"	Lynn DeShazo, Naida Hearn
9.	"Joy"	Amy Grant
10.	"We Will Glorify"	Twila Paris
11.	"Mourning Into Dancing"	Tommy Walker

== Personnel ==
- Joe Yerke - lead vocals
- Kyle Wasil - lead guitar
- Nate Sjogren - drums
- Beau McCarthy - bass guitar
- Bram Roberts - trumpet
- Mike Rowland - trombone
