= Live! Volume One =

Live album by the O.C. Supertones
- Released: March 26, 2002
- Genre: Christian ska
- Length: 73:45
- Label: BEC

The O.C. Supertones chronology
Loud and Clear (2000)	Live! Volume One (2002)	Hi-Fi Revival (2002)

Professional ratings
Review scores
Source	Rating
Jesus Freak Hideout	4.5/5 stars

Live! Volume One is the first live album released by the O.C. Supertones. It was recorded during four different shows on the Loud and Clear tour in 2001: Casper, Wyoming, Spokane, Washington, Seattle, Washington and Portland, Oregon. Adam Ferry was the drummer at the time but was not pictured due to his departure. Ferry played on this record and the song "Heavens Got a Baby" for the BEC Christmas compilation.

== Track listing ==
1. "Unite" (Live from Spokane, WA)
2. "Unknown" (Live from Seattle, WA)
3. "Resolution" (Live from Portland, OR)
4. "What It Comes To" (Live from Seattle, WA)
5. "Grounded" (Live from Seattle, WA)
6. "Sure Shot" (Live from Portland, OR)
7. "Jury Duty" (Live from Portland, OR)
8. "Adonai" (Live from Seattle, WA)
9. "Away from You" (Live from Seattle, WA)
10. "You Are My King (Amazing Love)" (Live from Portland, OR)
11. "Holiness" (Live from Portland, OR)
12. "Open the Eyes of My Heart" (Live from Portland, OR)
13. "Little Man" (Live from Portland, OR)
14. "Return of the Revolution" (Live from Portland, OR)
15. "So Great a Salvation" (Live from Portland, OR)
16. "Who Can Be Against Me" (Live from Spokane, WA)
17. "Supertones Strike Back" (Live from Spokane, WA)

== Credits ==
Players

- Matt Morginsky – lead vocals
- Daniel Spencer – trombone, backing vocals, hype man
- Ethan Luck – guitar, backing vocals, hype man
- Darren Mettler – trumpet, backing vocals, hype man
- Tony Terusa – bass, backing vocals, hype man
- Adam Ferry – drums

Album Production

- Bill Stevenson – engineer
- Jason Livermore – engineer
- Stephen Egerton – mixing
