= Fight of My Life =

Studio album by The Insyderz
- Released: 1998
- Genre: Christian ska
- Label: KMG Records

The Insyderz chronology
Paradise CD Single (1998)	Fight of My Life (1998)	Skalleluia Too! (1999)

Professional ratings
Review scores
Source	Rating
Cross Rhythms	(not rated) link
HM Magazine	(not rated) link
Jesus Freak Hideout	(not rated) link
Real Magazine	(not rated) link
CCM Magazine	(not rated)

Fight of My Life is the third full-length album by the Christian third-wave ska band The Insyderz, released in late 1998.

== Track listing ==
1. "Jigsaw"
2. "What Happened to Joe?"
3. "Paradise"
4. "The Hunted"
5. "Game Day"
6. "Trinidad"
7. "Rat Race"
8. "Just What I Needed"
9. "Fight of My Life"
10. "Forgive and Forget"

== Personnel ==
- Joe Yerke - Lead Vocals
- Beau McCarthy - Bass Guitar
- Kyle Wasil - Lead Guitar
- Nate Sjogren - Drums
- Bram Roberts - Trumpet
- Sang Kim - Trombone
