= Soundtrack to a Revolution =

Studio album by The Insyderz
- Released: November 11, 2003
- Recorded: Ringside Recording Studios
- Genre: Christian ska
- Label: Floodgate Records
- Producer: Royce Nunley

The Insyderz chronology
The Greatest & The Rarest (2001)	Soundtrack to a Revolution (2003)	The Sinner's Songbook (2012)

Professional ratings
Review scores
Source	Rating
The Phantom Tollbooth	3.5/5 Clocks 3/5 Clocks 4/5 Clocks
Jesus Freak Hideout	3.5/5 stars
Christianity Today	not rated
AlMenconi.com	not rated

Soundtrack to a Revolution is the fifth full-length album by the Christian ska band The Insyderz. Released on November 11, 2003, the album was produced and recorded by Royce Nunley at Ringside Recording Studios.

== Track listing ==
1. "Soundtrack To A Revolution"
2. "Call To Arms"
3. "Testimony"
4. "God Almighty"
5. "Shoot Out"
6. "Seeing Voices"
7. "Chosen Few"
8. "Another Sleepless Night"
9. "Better Half"
10. "Shame On Me"

== Personnel ==
- Joe- vocals
- Nate- drums
- Alan- cornet
- Beau- bass
- Sang- trombone
- Michael- guitar
- Bram- trumpet
