= Ethan Luck =

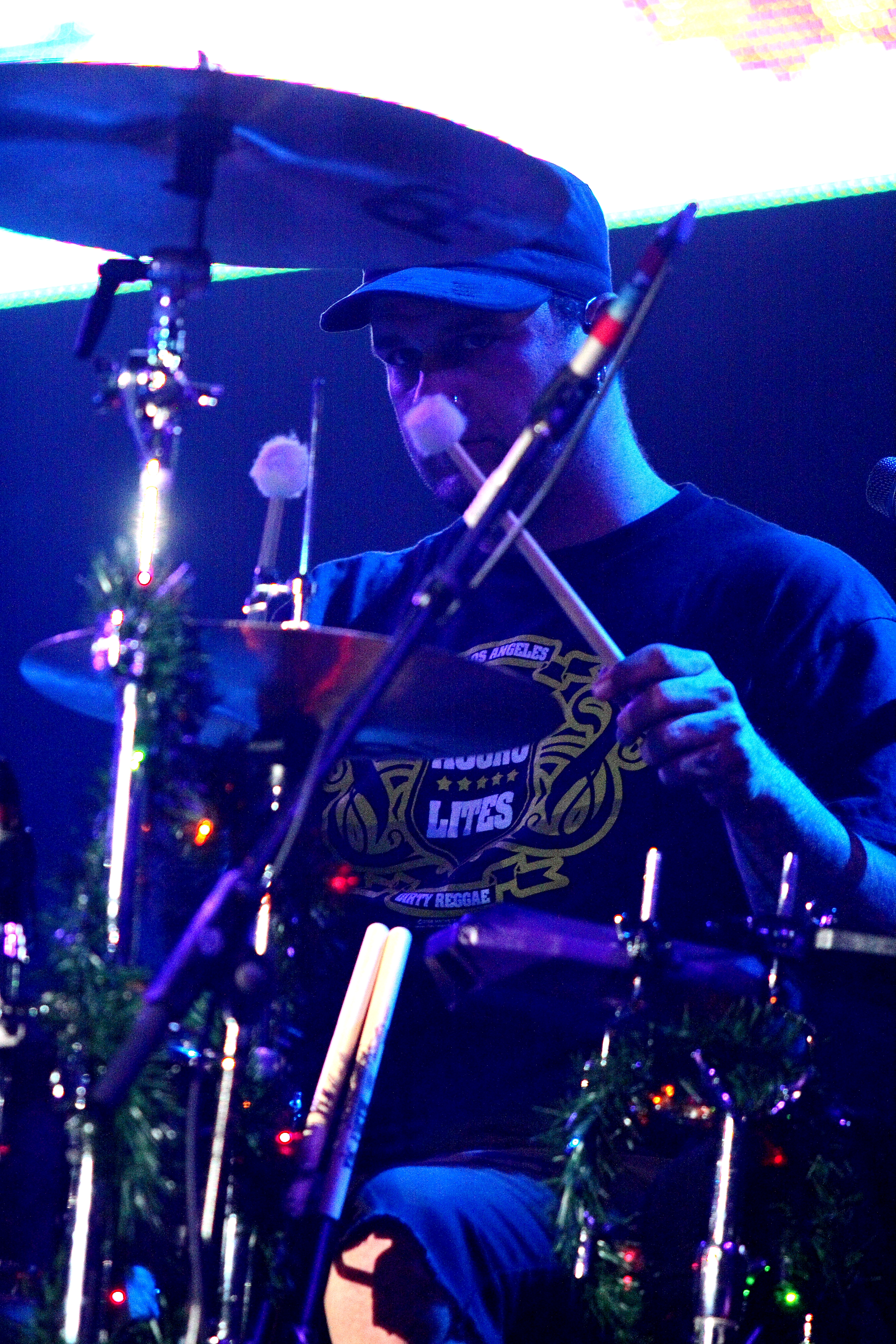
- Luck performing with Relient K in 2008

Background information
- Born: Ethan John Luck; Long Beach, California, U.S.
- Genres: Ska; heavy metal; punk rock; hard rock; alternative metal; pop punk
- Occupations: Musician; producer; guitarist; drummer; photographer
- Instruments: Guitar; bass guitar; drums; lap steel; vocals
- Years active: 1993–present
- Website: ethanluck.com

Ethan John Luck is an American musician, producer, multi-instrumentalist and photographer who has played in several bands, most prominently, the ska band The O.C. Supertones, Demon Hunter, Kings of Leon, Morgan Wade, and pop punk band Relient K. He has played on albums for Kutless, Roper, Nikki Clan and Last Tuesday.

== Background ==
Luck and fellow Supertones alumnus Daniel Spencer ran Rebel Waltz Recording Co., a recording studio based in Franklin, Tennessee. Artists that recorded there included Flatfoot 56, August Burns Red, The Send, The Lonely Hearts and many others. Luck and Spencer also had a short-lived, Nashville-based punk band called My Red Hot Nightmare. Luck continues his love of recording and engineered and produced Supertones singer Matt Morginsky's first solo record.

On February 12, 2008, Luck announced on his personal website that would be the new drummer for pop punk band Relient K. The band also made the announcement on their website. Luck also posted a letter to Demon Hunter fans about his future in the band. In August 2009, Luck and Don Clark decided to depart as guitarists from Demon Hunter. Luck and Clark's schedule's with Relient K and Invisible Creature, respectively, made it hard to keep up with Demon Hunter and their other projects.

In 2012, Luck began working on a new solo punk/ska/reggae project under the name Ethan Luck and the High Pressure System. The first single is "Hey Mr. Pharisee".

On April 21, 2013, Luck posted that he would no longer be with Relient K. He subsequently returned to the band for a 2022 tour as a bassist due to drummer Dave Douglas also returning to the group.

Luck ran two podcasts, the general music-themed The Pirate Satellite, and the Metallica-themed Metal Up Your Podcast, shared with fellow Nashville musician Clint Wells.

Luck and his wife are vegan.

Luck was the touring drummer for country singer, Morgan Wade, from 2021-2023. As of the summer of 2024, Luck is the guitarist for singer-songwriter, Max McNown.

== Bands ==
=== Current ===
- The Lees of Memory (touring musician) - electric and acoustic guitar: 2015–present
- Ethan Luck (solo): 2012–present
- Relient K - drums: 2008–2013; bass, backing vocals: 2022
- Morgan Wade - guitar: 2021-2023

== Studio work ==
- Disciple - Long Live the Rebels - bass (2016)
- Shane Tutmarc - "What Is This Love? (Single)" - Baritone Guitar - (2015)
- Shane Tutmarc - "Til Daddy Gets Paid (Single)" - Engineer, Lap Steel, Bass, Guitar, Drums - (2015)
- Corrin Campbell - "Where I Stand (Single)" - Guitar - (2012)
- Stephanie Smith - Not Afraid - Drums, Guitar, Bass & Music Written on Selected Tracks - Gotee Records (2008)
- Relient K - Let it Snow, Baby... Let it Reindeer - Lap Steel/"Country" Guitar - Gotee Records (2007)
- Demon Hunter - Storm the Gates of Hell - Engineered Guitar/Bass - Solid State Records (2007)
- MXPX - Secret Weapon - Engineered John Davis' guest vocals/Organ on "Sad Sad Song", Engineered Horns On "Punk Rock Celebrity" - Tooth & Nail Records (2007)
- Ruth - Secondhand Dreaming - Engineered John Davis guest vocals/Pedal Steel on "From Here To New York" Tooth & Nail Records (2007)
- Phil Joel - Deliberate Kids - Lap Steel on "Wise Man Rock" (2007)
- Chasing Victory - Fiends (album) - Pre-Production Engineer - Mono Vs Stereo (2007)
- Flatfoot 56 - Jungle of the Midwest Sea - Producer/Engineer/Mixer - Flicker Records (2007)
- Relient K - Five Score and Seven Years Ago - Moon Drums on "Deathbed" - Capitol Records (2007)
- The Send - Cosmos - Pre Production Engineer on "Begin" (2006)
- Kutless - Hearts of the Innocent - Music written for "Shut Me Out" and "The Legacy" w/ Aaron Sprinkle and Kutless - BEC Recordings (2006)
- Fair - The Best Worst-Case Scenario - Produced/Engineered John Davis' guest vocals/Pedal Steel - Tooth and Nail Records (2006)
- Last Tuesday - Become What You Believe - Producer/Engineered/Additional Guitar - Mono Vs Stereo (2006)
- John Davis - Arigato! - Pre Production Engineer (2006)
- Nikki Clan - Nikki Clan - Guitar/Bass - Sony Mexico (2006)
- Kutless - Strong Tower - Guitar - BEC Recordings (2005)
- Last Tuesday - Resolve - Guitar Solo on "It's Not Too Late" - Mono Vs Stereo (2005)
- What I Like About You - TV Show Cues - Guitar - Warner Bros. Records (2005)
- Roper - Brace Yourself for the Mediocre - Guitar/ Music Written on Selected Tracks - Five Minute Walk (2004)

== Discography ==
Ethan Luck

- "Hey, Mr. Pharisee" (Single) – (2012) – vocals, guitar, bass, drums, keys
- Wounds, Fears EP (2013) – vocals, guitar, bass, drums, baritone, lap steel
- Cold Music EP (2013) – vocals, guitar, bass, drums, lap steel
- Hard Seas EP (2014) – vocals, guitar, bass, drums, baritone, lap steel
- Ethan Luck, The Intruders EP (2015) – vocals, guitar, bass guitar, drums
- Let It Burn (2018) – vocals, guitar, bass guitar, drums, percussion, melodica
- The Golden West (2021)

Relient K

- The Bird and the Bee Sides – Gotee Records (2008) – drums, vocals
- Forget and Not Slow Down – Gotee Records (2009) – drums, vocals
- Is for Karaoke – Mono Vs Stereo Records (2011) – drums
- Collapsible Lung – Mono Vs Stereo Records (2013) – drums

Demon Hunter

- The Triptych – Solid State Records (2005) – lead guitar
- Storm the Gates of Hell – Solid State Records (2007) – lead guitar

My Red Hot Nightmare

- A Tribute to Superdrag – Double D Records (2006) – vocals, guitar
- My Other Band, Vol. 1 – Mono Vs Stereo (2006) – vocals, guitar, bass guitar

The O.C. Supertones

- Unite – BEC Recordings (2005) – guitar
- Revenge of the O.C. Supertones – BEC Recordings (2004) – guitar, bass
- Veggie Rocks! Compilation – Forefront Records (2004) – guitar, vocals on "I Can Be Your Friend"
- Hi-Fi Revival – Tooth And Nail Records (2002) – guitar
- Happy Christmas Vol. 3– "Heaven's Got a Baby" – BEC Recordings (2001) – guitar
- Live! Volume One– Tooth And Nail Records (2001) – guitar
- Loud and Clear – BEC Recordings (2000) – guitar

Guerilla Rodeo

- Ride, Rope and Destroy – Ministry of Defense (2004) – guitar

Grand Incredible

- G.I. Gantic – BEC Recordings (2002) – guitar, drums

The Dingees

- Happy Christmas – BEC Recordings (1998) – drums on "We Three Kings"
- Armageddon Massive– BEC Recordings (1998) – drums
