= Become What You Believe =

Studio album by Last Tuesday
- Released: August 15, 2006
- Genre: Punk rock, pop punk, Christian punk
- Label: Mono vs Stereo
- Producer: Dan Spencer, Ethan Luck

Last Tuesday chronology
Resolve (2005)	Become What You Believe (2006)

Become What You Believe is a 2006 album by Last Tuesday. It was originally released on August 15, 2006 through Mono vs Stereo.

== Track listing ==
1. Become What You Believe
2. This Is the Way
3. 1999
4. Deal with It
5. Carry On
6. Wake Me Up
7. Can You Hear Me?
8. Stand, The
9. Giving Up
10. My Last Regret
