= The Deadlines =

Disbanded American rock band

- Origin: Portland, Oregon, U.S.
- Genres: Horror punk, glam rock
- Years active: 1998–2002
- Label: Tooth & Nail Records
- Members: Shaun Sundholm; Tim Eurich; Gerrit Lovesick; Joshua Griffith; Travis Waldie
- Past members: Brian Jones (a.k.a. Spencer Spooks); Sam Weisenan (a.k.a. Sammy Lugosi); Thomas Krause (a.k.a. Thomas Demise); Brent Salo (a.k.a. The Creature); Jeremy Abbott (a.k.a. Jerry Attrick); Carlos Colon (a.k.a. Carlos Cadaver)

The Deadlines were an American rock band that formed in 1998 and disbanded in 2002. Their musical style started as horror punk and later evolved toward glam rock. They were signed to Tooth & Nail Records.

== History ==
The Deadlines were founded in 1998 by singer and guitarist, Shaun Sundholm and drummer, Jeremy Abbott. Formerly known as The Oblivious Kids, The Chosen Few, and The Pinheads, the band had played together as early as 1996. Jared Beddingfield joined the band as bass guitarist for only two shows. Brian Jones later joined as bass player. The band recorded a four-song demo cassette and played a handful of shows. It was in 1998, the band began taking on a darker, horror-punk rock sound akin to Murder City Devils, The Damned or The Misfits. With the new sound the band changed their name to The Deadlines.

During their years as a horror punk band, the members of The Deadlines used stage names rather than their given names. The first lineup consisted of Sundholm, whose then-stage name was Shaun Coffin, on vocals and guitar; Jeremy Abbott, who went by Jerry Attrick, on drums; and Brian "Spencer Spooks" Jones bass. The newly re-christened Deadlines began playing shows in the Portland, Oregon area and soon caught the eye of a local start-up record label Royal Star Music and Astoria, Oregon native Sam Waisanen. Not long after, Sam joined the band as Sammy Lugosi; and they were in a makeshift basement studio recording their first album for the fledgling label. After the release, the band began playing more and more shows attracting the attention of fellow Astorian, Brent Salo, who quickly signed on to play keyboards under the guise of The Creature From the Brent Lagoon. Not three months later and the band was scheduled to play the growing Christian indie festival TomFest and were attracting the attention of several more well established independent record labels.

During their performance at TomFest, Gabriel Wilson shouted, "Somebody sign these guys!." Almost immediately, they were offered a recording contract by Tooth & Nail Records and became the first and, as of 2006, only horror punk band in the label's history. Two months later, the band recorded their debut album for Tooth & Nail, The Death and Life of... at the Robert Lang Studios which had become well known in the 1990s as the place where Nirvana had made their last studio album. Soon after recording their first album, Jones left the band and was replaced by Thomas Demise. The album had not yet been released when Jones left, so Demise was listed as the band's bassist on the full-length, while Jones was given credit (as Spencer Spooks) in the album's liner notes. Meanwhile, the band started touring more and more of the United States.

The band's lyrics mixed topics regarding death, gore and general horror movie fare with a basis in Christian themes. In live performances and photos, the band members wore old suits and pale makeup intending to appear that they had recently escaped from coffins. The band's live shows featured blood, spitting, fire breathing and knife wielding extras, which set them apart from other bands in the Pacific Northwest.

=== Death and life of.... ===
After releasing The Deadlines song "Go, Go to the Graveyard" on one of their compilations, Tooth & Nail released The Deadlines next album The Death & Life Of... in March 2000. Tooth & Nail was planning for some controversy regarding the album and they released it with different album covers for the Christian and secular markets. (Earlier, Tooth & Nail had taken the same approach when releasing Training for Utopia's first full-length Plastic Soul Impalement). The album met with some additional controversy in Christian circles due to its lyrics that dwelt on death, vampires and drug use, among other topics. The band eventually agreed to include a card inside the Christian market CD case that explained the lyrics to each song.

Following the release of the album, The Deadlines hired 2nd guitarist Carlos Colón (a.k.a. Carlos Cadaver) to take over the lead guitar as Shaun Coffin assumed full-time vocal duties. The tour that followed would consist of over the top theatrics including, spitting blood, lighting their equipment on fire and on occasion, Sundholm's brother juggling knives.

=== Fashion Over Function ===
The Deadlines underwent a major overhaul in October 2000 after their three-month United States tour with The Huntingtons and Squad Five-O when Sammy Lugosi, Brent Salo (a.k.a. The Creature), Carlos Cadaver and Thomas Demise left the band. Carlos Cadaver moved back to Los Angeles. Waisanen, Salo, and Demise went on to start a new project The Red Sect. After a period of disillusionment, lead singer Sundholm began writing new songs although, in a completely different vein and once again called on Jerry Attrick to help him flesh out the new tunes. Playing through the new material with Attrick led to the maturation of the new songs from a '60s garage rock to more glam '70s sound. Not wanting to discontinue a still relatively new band, Sundholm and Abbott recruited several new members namely, Joshua Griffith (also known as Shorty Valentine) who had played in Tragedy Ann, and Tim Eurich of Killaways. The new incarnation of The Deadlines decided to completely drop the horror schtick, instead favoring a more straightforward sound that blended blues-based rock 'n' roll with glam rock and punk influences. The Deadlines immediately started work on their new album which, was originally called Out on the Streets and was released in November 2001 with the title Fashion Over Function. Soon after, Abbott left the band to start a family and was replaced by Travis Waldie. The Deadlines also added Gerrit Lovesick, who had played with Eurich and Griffith in Killaways.

The Deadlines started 2002 with an album release party and they were gaining attention and appearing on the covers on local alternative newspapers. At the same time, sales for the second album were not as high as expected. Tooth & Nail was growing more distant and afraid of upsetting the label's Christian market fan-base and tried to shop the band to several labels both independent and major. Nothing came of the wheeling and dealing and the stress began to wear on Sundholm. Tooth & Nail refused to let the Deadlines change their name. In February 2002, Tooth & Nail dropped The Deadlines after failing to find a new home for the band. The Deadlines continued to tour for several more months but announced in July 2002 that they were disbanding.

=== Breakup and other projects ===
Soon after, practically overlapping The Deadlines break up, most of the members (minus Waldie) started a new project called The Bang! which, had a sound similar to The Deadlines' work in Fashion Over Function but with a more raw rock and roll sound. The BANG! included new drummer Linus and was no longer signed to Tooth & Nail. The BANG! recorded a never-released three-song demo while on tour in California, but they disbanded by mid-September 2002 and announced on their website, "The Bang! is officially over. Thanks for your interest. Stay tuned for whatever's next."

Thomas Demise, Sam Waisanen, Jeremy Abbott, Brenton Salo all currently still reside in the Pacific Northwest.

== Discography ==
- The Deadlines (1999, Royal Star Music)
- The Death and Life Of... (2000, Tooth & Nail Records)
- Split 10" with Squad Five-O ([2000]), Tooth & Nail Records *rumoured but never fulfilled.
- Fashion Over Function (2001, Tooth & Nail Records)
