= Armageddon Massive =

Studio album by The Dingees
- Released: March 24, 1998
- Genre: Punk rock
- Label: BEC Recordings

The Dingees chronology
Armageddon Massive (1998)	Sundown to Midnight (1999)

Professional ratings
Review scores
Source	Rating
Cross Rhythms	(not rated)
The Phantom Tollbooth	(not rated)
7ball	(not rated)
YouthWorker	(not rated)

Armageddon Massive is the debut full-length album from Californian ska band The Dingees. The album's sound moves between punk and ska, and its lyrics focus on the frustrations of life.

== Track listing ==
1. "Ghetto Box Smash"
2. "Chaos Control"
3. "Bullet Proof"
4. "Could Be Worse"
5. "Workin' Man's Blues"
6. "Rebel Youth"
7. "Betrayal"
8. "Deadman"
9. "Carry On With The Countdown"
10. "Another Burnin' City"
11. "Escape To L.A."
  - Dub version of "Could Be Worse" (hidden track) starts at 4:20

== Personnel ==
- Pegleg - Vocals
- Bean Hernandez - Bass
- Jeff Holmes - Guitar
- Ethan Luck - Drums

== Guest musicians ==
- David Ralicke - Trombone, Bari Sax
- Efren Santana - Tenor Sax
- Kincaid Smith - Trumpet
- Ronnie King - Keys
