= Squad Five-O =

American punk rock band

- Origin: Savannah, Georgia, USA
- Genres: Ska punk, glam punk, Christian punk
- Years active: 1997-present
- Labels: BulletProof Music, Tooth & Nail, Capitol Records
- Past members: Jeff Fortson; John Fortson; Jason Anderson; Justin Garbinski; Adam Garbinski; Kris Klein; Dave Petersen

Squad Five-O was an American punk rock band from Savannah, Georgia. Like their initial ska-punk stylings, their name was derived from a cross between the television shows Hawaii Five-O and The Mod Squad. Between 1997 and 2006 the band grew lyrically and in popularity, and also shifted its style significantly. Over the course of their career they moved from a small indie Christian label to the major label Capitol Records and released five albums in the process.

== History ==
Squad Five-O was founded by the Fortson brothers, Jeff and John, who initially formed a high-school band called Gypsy Rose with a drummer named Juan. Gypsy had a thrash metal sound; other associated band names: Bloom; BMX (Jeff Fortson: Guit/Vox, John Fortson: Bass/BGV, Guy Weaver: Drums/BGV) PUNKS on a MISSION. the band evolved through several names, members, and sounds before finally signing to a local record label, BulletProof Music. The band's following grew quickly, spurred on by the growing popularity of artists such as Five Iron Frenzy, the Insyderz, Supertones and third-wave ska in general. In 1997 they took HM Magazine's reader's choice award for "Favorite New Artist of 1997".

Georgia state flag, 1956–2001

The Confederate Navy Jack, 1863-1865

"Our State Flag Sucks" called the "Georgia state flag banner of hate" for its likeness to flags of the Confederate States of America. The lyrics caused the album to be pulled from some Christian book stores.

During the band's initial period, their sound was basic punk music with heavy ska influences. One Christian music magazine described their sound as a collision between Ninety Pound Wuss and The OC Supertones. From the outset the group ran into controversy. Their initial release, What I Believe, contained a song entitled "Our State Flag Sucks". The lyrical content of the song, which called the Georgia state flag (the 1956-2001 version was flying at the time) a banner of hate for its likeness to flags of the Confederate States of America, caused the album to be banned from many Christian bookstores. (Flags shown at right.)

What I Believe and the band's second release, Fight the System, were released by Bulletproof Music. Fight the System was unique in that, although it had 18 listed tracks plus a hidden bonus track, it had 31 tracks of silence before the bonus track, "Rock and Roll Anthem". This gave the album 50 tracks overall, a nod to the "Five-O" in the band's name. Drummer Jason Anderson left after Fight the System and was replaced by Justin Garbinski of Speedy Delivery; Justin's brother, Adam, who also played in The Huntingtons as A.J. Huntington, joined on guitar.

The band got into a dispute over publishing rights with their label and were helped by Brandon Ebel, president of the major Christian label Tooth & Nail Records, with whom they later signed. The sound on their first two releases was characterized as ska punk, but that changed with their label. Their 2000 album Bombs Over Broadway was produced by Duane Baron. The band credits Baron with helping them to refine their rock sound. As Jeff Fortson reported to HM "he helped us slow things down and find the right groove... he really helped us realize what we were trying to do." CCM magazine characterized the move as completing their transformation into glam rockers.

The original cover art of Bombs Over Broadway showed warplanes flying through downtown New York. The album's title track described an attack on New York City and warned that other cities would also be attacked. Bombs Over Broadway also contained a card explaining the lyrics to the songs; Tooth & Nail did the same with The Deadlines' first album, The Death & Life Of..., which used death-related metaphors in most of its songs. After the attacks of September 11 occurred the following year, Tooth & Nail decided to change the album's cover to show a picture of the band members. The new release of the album still had the same songs as the original album had. Just as well, the band refrained from playing the song "Bombs over Broadway" at live performances in the initial tour after 9/11. But slowly over time, the band would incorporate the track as part of their encore performance.

"After playing GMA conventions and Christian sales conference showcases, I began to realize that this whole thing is an industry... We are a business... I'm an entertainer other band members such as Jake and Jake from Fire Engine Red spent all summer in a tent collaborated this. My faith colors what I do."

— Jeff Fortson on the Christian music industry

For Squad 5-O, the move to Tooth and Nail was more than just a change of approach in musical style. The band also began to move away from explicit references to Jesus, and to use metaphor more extensively. They also began to tour in more mainstream venues than churches, as explained by Jeff Fortson: "Jesus said to be fishers of men; we have realized that you can't do that unless you're where the people who need him are." Generally, the band was discontented with the state of the Christian music industry and Christian subculture, which they saw as exploitive and misleading. Jeff Fortson contrasted for HM magazine their experiences playing at a "large Christian event" and a secular one a few days later. At the Christian event (which was headlined by Steven Curtis Chapman) "... the kids were coming out of the seats and standing in the aisles to come up and rock out with us... They just shut us down... The park security and promoters evidently thought we were just evil and inciting riots." At the secular show they reported that they could "...connect with the kids, you know, just be real... same exact response from the crowd, and that's why I feel that's where we belong."

"Bands that influenced us, like Op Ivy... never told their audience what to believe... It was presented in a way to make you think."

— Jeff Fortson on Five-O's lyrics, 2004

Common themes in their music are the power of the youth, the effects of social ills, and Christian unity, though with Squad Five-O, their final Tooth & Nail release, the group had largely moved away from spiritual themes. Their 2002 eponymous release was produced by Barry Pointer, and featured a sound which the band characterized as more in tune with their live shows. After their contract was sold to the general market label Capitol Records their lyrics appeared to leave their Christian roots, but the band still professed to be Christians.

Their final album, Late News Breaking, was released in 2004.

Their web site went dead in early 2006 and have had small amounts of activity from their Myspace page including posting a B-side track titled "Easy to Shoot" but it has been assumed the band has broken up to move on to other projects.

Bassist John Fortson & guitarist Adam Garbinski formed the rock band Gasoline Heart with Louis DeFabrizio, formerly of the Kick.

Squad Five-O reunited for Cornerstone 2012 and in 2018 and performs occasionally.

In March 2018, Eleventyseven interviewed lead singer Jeff Fortson on the Eleventylife podcast.

On June 5th 2026, Squad Five-O played their final show at District Live in Savannah, GA.

== Members ==
- Jeff Fortson - Vocals, guitar (1997–2006)
- John Fortson - Bass (1997–2006)
- Adam Garbinski - Guitar (1999–2006)
- Matt Morris - Drums (1998-1999)
- Kris Klein - Guitar (2000–2006)
- Dave Petersen - Drums (2001–2006)
- Jason Anderson - Drums (1997–2000)
- Justin Garbinski - Drums (2000–2002)

== Discography ==
- 1997: What I Believe (BulletProof Records, Reviews: In Music We Trust, YouthWorker, 7ball)
- 1998: Fight the System (BulletProof Records, Reviews: HM Magazine, YouthWorker)
- 2000: Bombs Over Broadway (Tooth & Nail Records, Reviews: Teen Ink, Real Magazine, The Phantom Tollbooth, Pop Matters, HM Magazine, CCM Magazine)
- 2002: Squad Five-O (Tooth & Nail Records, Review:HM Magazine, CCM Magazine)
- 2004: Late News Breaking (Capitol Records, Reviews: Decapolis, The Phantom Tollbooth, Stylus Magazine, PastePunk.com, PunkNews.org, Smother.net)
- 2022: Solid Gold (Daddio Records)
