= Revenge of The O.C. Supertones =

Revenge of the O.C. Supertones

Studio album by the O.C. Supertones
- Released: June 15, 2004
- Recorded: Dark Horse Recording, Franklin, Tennessee
- Genre: Christian ska
- Length: 43:38
- Label: BEC
- Producer: Mark Lee Townsend

The O.C. Supertones chronology
Hi-Fi Revival (2002)	Revenge of the O.C. Supertones (2004)	Unite (2005)

Professional ratings
Review scores
Source	Rating
Jesus Freak Hideout	4.5/5 stars

Revenge of the O.C. Supertones is the sixth studio album released by the O.C. Supertones.

== Track listing ==
1. "Wake Me Up On Time" - 3:22
2. "Where I Find You" - 3:53
3. "We Shall Overcome" - 2:34
4. "Transmission" - 2:24
5. "Prince of Peace" - 3:03
6. "Shepherd is the Lamb" - 4:38
7. "Everything's Broken" - 3:46
8. "The Kingdom" - 2:36
9. "Faith of a Child" - 3:41
10. "Cult of Cool" - 3:05
11. "I Will Follow" - 2:59
12. "Dream of Two Cities" - 10:09

== Credits ==
Production

- Mark Lee Townsend – producer
- The O.C. Supertones – producers
- Jason Wilson – engineer
- Steve Winiarski – assistant engineer
- J.R. McNeeley – mixing
- Troy Glessner – mastering at Spectre Studios (Tacoma, Washington)
- Asterik Studio – design
- Mike Payne – photography

The O.C. Supertones

- Matt Morginsky – vocals, Moog synthesizer
- Ethan Luck – guitars, backing vocals
- Chris Beaty – bass,
- Jason Carson – drums, percussion
- Daniel Spencer – trombone, backing vocals
- Darren Mettler – trumpet, backing vocals

Additional musicians

- John Davis – acoustic piano (4), Hammond organ (4), lead guitar (4), backing vocals (4), gang vocals
- Rob Roy Fingerhead – nylon guitar (9), gang vocals
- Sam Branhart – gang vocals
