= Rebel Soul Sound System =

the Rebel Soul Sound System

Studio album by The Dingees
- Released: September 24, 2010
- Genre: Rock, reggae
- Length: 57:53
- Label: International City
- Producer: The Dingees

The Dingees chronology
The Crucial Conspiracy (2001)	the Rebel Soul Sound System (2010)

Professional ratings
Review scores
Source	Rating
Absolute Punk	(?)

the Rebel Soul Sound System is the fourth full-length album by Californian band The Dingees. The album was home recorded, self-produced & independently released free of charge on Jamendo. The album has been described as a refining of the bands aesthetic, while remaining true to their roots.

== Track listing ==
1. "Sound Depression" – 3:00
2. "Test the Champion - The Hardest Game" – 4:48
3. "Blackout!" – 3:20
4. "street vs. state - Global Tribal - reconstruction" – 6:26
5. "Capital Imperial" – 1:58
6. "Still on the Move" – 4:20
7. "Port Royal Sound" – 3:26
8. "Mercy Triumphs Over Judgement" – 3:19
9. "Smoke Signals" – 9:42
10. "Who Stole the Soul in Rock N Roll" – 5:06
11. "I'll Be'Neath the Canopy" – 5:38
12. "Everybody Today" – 2:10
13. "One Inch Equation" – 4:48

== Personnel ==
- Pegleg - vocals, acoustic guitar, electric guitar, drum programming, sample sequencing, synth, piano, organ, alto & baritone sax, rhodes, clavinet, artwork, recording & engineering
- Bean Hernandez - bass, electric guitar
- Aaron Landers - lead guitar, organ, piano, backing vocals, 12 string acoustic guitar, rhodes, additional engineering
- Scott Rodgers - drums, percussion, backing vocals, additional engineering
- Dave Chevalier - tenor sax, vocals
- Jeff Holmes - vocal, lead guitar
- J Bonner - organ, piano
- Beeken - saxophones, flute, clarinet
- Bryan - trumpet, flugelhorn
- Farmer - trombone
- ShermOnE - turntable, drum machine
- Kelly Mallet - backing vocals
- J Ross Parrelli - backing vocals
- Chelsea Somma - backing vocals

analog mix by Pete Mattern Planet X studio
