= Sundown to Midnight =

Studio album by The Dingees
- Released: June 29, 1999
- Genre: Punk rock/Ska
- Length: 39:23
- Label: BEC Recordings
- Producer: Steve Kravac

The Dingees chronology
Armageddon Massive (1998)	Sundown to Midnight (1999)	The Crucial Conspiracy (2001)

Professional ratings
Review scores
Source	Rating
Cross Rhythms	link
HM Magazine	link
The Phantom Tollbooth	link

Sundown to Midnight is the second full-length album from California ska band The Dingees

== Track listing ==
1. "Rally-O" – 2:47
2. "Can't Trust No Man" – 2:46
3. "Votes And Violence" – 2:41
4. "Radio Freedom" – 3:45
5. "Leave The Kids Alone" – 1:39
6. "Trial Tribulation" – 4:17
7. "Chevy Maibu" – 2:54
8. "Staff Sgt. Skreba" – 1:35
9. "Dark Hollywood" – 5:40
10. "San Francisco" – 3:14
11. "New Route" – 3:36
12. "Sundown To Midnight" – 2:04
13. "You In My Heart" – 2:26

== Musicians ==
- Pegleg – Vocals
- Aaron Landers – Guitar
- Bean Hernandez – Fender Bass
- Dave Chevalier – Vocals, Sax
- Frank Lenz – Drums
- Steve Kravac – Drums and Percussion
- Travis Larson – Trombone
- Justin Berardino – Alto Sax
- Ronnie King – Keys
