= Rogue Music Alliance =

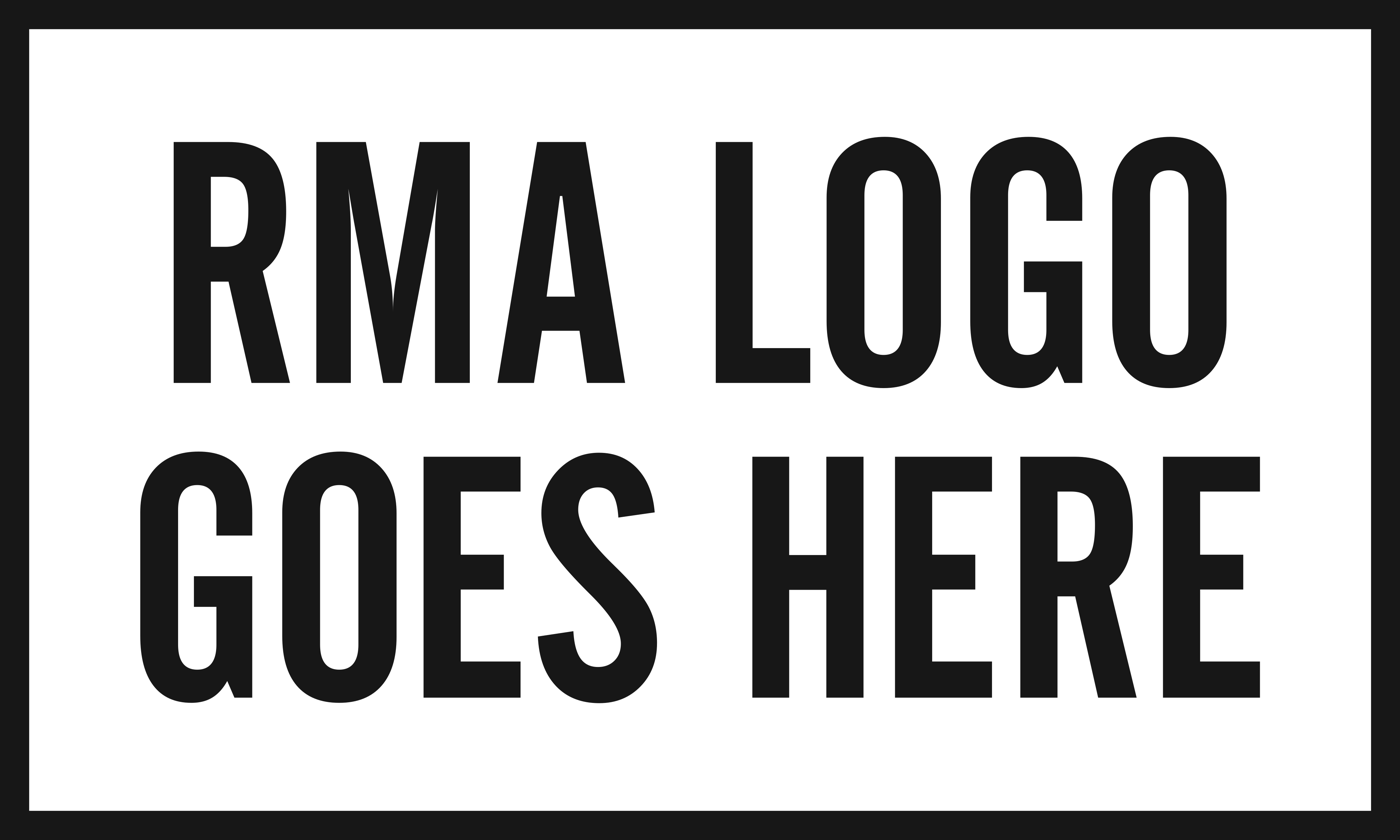
- Founded: 2016
- Founder: Gabriel Wilson, David Staley
- Genre: Contemporary Christian
- Country of origin: U.S.
- Location: Vancouver, Washington
- Official website: theroguemusicalliance.com

Rogue Music Alliance is an American independent record label based in Vancouver, Washington. RMA was established in 2016 by Gabriel Wilson and David Staley when they discovered the need independent artists have for label services á la carte. They claim this type of model for a record label gives artists the chance to successfully bring their music to market without giving up the majority ownership of their work. RMA specializes in audio production, intelligent branding, song coaching, and social media marketing.

RMA released Lindy Conant & The Circuit Riders debut, Every Nation and John Mark McMillan's first genre No. 1 album Mercury & Lightning.

Additionally, RMA was responsible for the release of the controversial, first posthumous release by Prince Rogers Nelson, Deliverance – EP.

== Discography ==
| Artist | Title | Primary Genre | Secondary Genre | Credit | Release year |
|---|---|---|---|---|---|
| Influence Music | Touching Heaven | Christian & Gospel | | Production, Marketing | 2018 |
| Longlake | Beyond the Sun | Rock | | Video Production | 2018 |
| The Light The Heat | Thousand Love Songs - Single | Singer/Songwriter | | Video Production, Marketing | 2018 |
| Matthew James Mason | Refuge - EP | Christian & Gospel | | Production, Video Production, Marketing, Aggregation | 2018 |
| Pursue Worship | Let it Rise | Christian & Gospel | | Marketing | 2017 |
| John Mark McMillan | Mercury & Lightning | Singer/Songwriter | Christian & Gospel | Production, Marketing | 2017 |
| Prince Rogers Nelson | Deliverance - EP | Rock | Christian & Gospel | Production, Marketing | 2017 |
| Ray Dalton | If You Fall - Single | Pop | | Marketing | 2017 |
| The Pearls | The Pearls | Singer/Songwriter | | Video Production, Marketing | 2016 |
| Lindy Conant & The Circuit Riders | Every Nation | Christian & Gospel | | Production, Artist Development, Branding, Video Production, Marketing, Aggregation | 2016 |
| Columbus | Zieh Du ii | German Pop | | Production, Video Production, Marketing | 2016 |
| KXC | Flux | Christian & Gospel | | Production | 2015 |
| The Bright Expression | Bone by Bone | Christian & Gospel | | Production, Marketing | 2015 |
| Renn | Heartache and a Song | Singer/Songwriter | | Production, Video Production, Marketing | 2015 |
