= The Dingees =

American band

- Also known as: Peg & The Rejected
- Origin: Orange County, California, USA
- Genres: Punk rock, reggae, ska
- Years active: 1996–present
- Labels: International City Recordings BEC Recordings, Tooth & Nail
- Website: thedingees.bandcamp.com

The Dingees is a multi genre band formed in the summer of 1996, from Orange County, California.

== Other projects ==
- All members record together in the ska band, Peg & The Rejected
- Pegleg & DC record together as Staflos
- Pegleg records solo as DreadPirateRoberts
- Dave Chevalier records solo as Betamax DC
- Scott Rodgers records solo as Dead Drummer Friends
- Matt Hernandez played in Project 86 and Unashamed
- Aaron Landers played keyboards in All Night Pressure
- Tony Terusa is currently in The O.C. Supertones and was in Saved.
- Ethan Luck was in many bands, most notably : Demon Hunter, The O.C. Supertones, Project 86, and Relient K.

== Lineup ==
- Matthew "Pegleg" Roberts: vocals, guitar, alto saxophone (1996–present)
- Dave Chevalier: tenor saxophone, vocals, keys (1996–present)
- Matt "Bean" Hernandez: bass (1996–present)
- Aaron Landers: guitar (1998–present)
- Scott Rodgers: drums (1999–present)

== Former members ==
- Tony Terusa: drums (1996–1997)
- Jon Bon: trombone (1996–1998)
- Jeff Holmes: guitar (1996–1998)
- Ethan Luck: drums (1997–1999)
- Brad Ber: guitar
- Travis Larsen: trombone

== Discography ==
=== Studio albums ===
- Armageddon Massive (1998)
- Sundown to Midnight (1999)
- The Crucial Conspiracy (2001)
- Rebel Soul Sound System (2010)
- 4th Wave (as Peg & the Rejected) (2016)
- 2nd Set (as Peg & the Rejected) (2017)
- 2 Stoned (as Peg & the Rejected) (2022)
- Dropseeds E.P. (2023)

=== Compilation appearances ===
- "Wake Up" from Skanktified (1998)
- "Another Burnin' City" from Songs From the Penalty Box, Vol. 2 (1998)
- "We Three Kings" from Happy Christmas (1998)
- "Bullet Proof" and "Calm Down" from Moms Like Us Too - Volume One: A BEC Records Compilation (1999)
- "Bullet Proof" from Propska One (1999)
- "Staff Sgt. Skreba" from Songs From the Penalty Box, Vol. 3 (1999)
- "In My Heart" from Tooth & Nail Records * BEC Recordings present...Fall 1999 Sampler (1999)
- "Leave the Kids Alone" from Cheapskates: The Harder Side (2000)
- "Spraypaint" from Songs From the Penalty Box, Vol. 4 (2000)
- "Trial Tribulation" from The Solution to Benefit Heal the Bay (2000)
- "Dear John Letter (To the Devil)" from Start Right Here: Remembering the Life of Keith Green (2001)
- "Summer" from Safety First (2001)
- "1000 Sparks" from Ska Lives Vol. 2 (2016)
- "Psalm 137" from 4th Wave Ska (2021)
