= The Listening (band) =

American rock band

- Origin: Washington
- Genres: Christian rock, Alternative
- Years active: 2004–present
- Labels: L-Town
- Members: Gabriel Wilson; Nolan Russom; Josiah Schmidt; Jason Miller
- Past members: Chris Greely; Eric Lemiere; Josiah Sherman; Kyle Reid
- Website: thelistening.com

The Listening is an American rock band from Washington currently based in Franklin, Tennessee. The group toured throughout North America and Europe from 2004-2006. Following a hiatus, Gabriel Wilson had become a worship leader and a prominent figure in the music program at Bethel Church in Redding, California. Josiah and Nolan remained in Tennessee while Jason now resides in Folsom, California. The members of The Listening continue to collaborate by exchanging musical ideas and instrument tracks online.

A planned LP by The Listening, titled, “LMNOP” has been in the works. No set release date has been released.

== Discography ==
- The Listening EP (2004, Fierce UK)
- The Listening LP (2005, L-Town Music Group)
- Transmission 1 EP (2008, L-Town Music Group)

== Band Members ==
Current members

- Gabriel Wilson – vocals, guitar, rhodes (2004–present)
- Nolan Russom – drums, vocals (2007–present)
- Josiah Schmidt – keys, pads, synths, moogs, guitar (2007–present)
- Jason Miller – guitar, bass, fuzz, moog (2009–present)

Former members

- Kyle Reid – bass, fuzz, moogs (2008–2009)
- Chris Greely – (2004–2007)
- Eric Lemiere – (2004–2007)
- Josiah Sherman – (2004–2007)

== Sources ==
- Interview, Jesus Freak Hideout, 2008
