= The Crucial Conspiracy =

2001 studio album by the Dingees

Studio album by The Dingees
- Released: January 23, 2001
- Genres: Punk rock, ska
- Length: 39:17
- Label: Tooth & Nail / Open Water
- Producers: The Dingees; Chris Colbert; Frank Lenz

The Dingees chronology
Sundown to Midnight (1999)	The Crucial Conspiracy (2001)	Rebel Soul Sound System (2010)

Professional ratings
Review scores
Source	Rating
Cross Rhythms	(not rated) link
The Phantom Tollbooth	(not rated) link
Jesus Freak Hideout	(not rated) link
CCM Magazine	(not rated)
HM Magazine	(not rated)

The Crucial Conspiracy is the third full-length album by Californian ska band The Dingees. The album shows a reggae and roots music influence, although its style constantly shifts and includes what was described as only "a fading memory" of third wave ska.

== Track listing ==
1. "Spray Paint" – 3:03
2. "Middle Man" – 2:14
3. "Summer" – 3:41
4. "Dear Sister, Dear Brother" – 4:21
5. "Christina Fight Back" – 1:41
6. "Ronnie Raygun" – 1:15
7. "We Rot the Voodoo" – 2:52
8. "General Information" – 2:17
9. "Latch Key Kids" – 3:44
10. "Moving Underground" – 4:10
11. "Whole Scene" – 3:43
12. "The World's Last Night" – 4:37
13. "Declaration" – 1:39

== Personnel ==
- Pegleg – vocals, guitar, sax
- Dave Chevalier – throat, tenor sax, organ, piano
- Aaron Landers – guitar, organ, backups
- Bean – M-bass
- Scott Rodgers – drums, backups

== Guest musicians ==
- J Bonner – Hammond organ, Rhodes, clavinet, Melodica, Produb
- Angelo Moore – bari sax, alto sax, Theremin, vocals
- Ronnie Martin – synth
- Travis Larsen – trombone
- Mike Sullivan – trumpet
- Frank Lenz – drums, percussion, organ, piano
- Chris Colbert – sampling

== Vinyl release ==
The Crucial Conspiracy was re-released on vinyl by Open Water Records in 2009.
