= Last Tuesday =

American Christian punk band

- Origin: Harrisburg, Pennsylvania, United States
- Genres: Pop-punk, punk rock, Christian punk
- Years active: 1999–2007
- Label: Mono vs Stereo
- Past members: Steve Gee; Carl (Brengle) Emmons; Ben Hannigan; Chris Murk; Ryan Jernigan; Bish; Brett Algera; Andrew Smith Culp; Mike Hopper; Jim McConnell; Stephen Laubach; John Russo

Last Tuesday was an American Christian punk band formed in 1999 in Harrisburg, Pennsylvania, United States. They played their final show on March 10, 2007, with their final lineup consisting of drummer Chris Murk, and bassists Carl Brengle and Ben Hannigan. After the announcement from Steve Gee that he would be leaving the band, Last Tuesday no longer had any of its original members.

== Discography ==
Their last release, Become What You Believe, was very successful since its release on August 15, 2006. The new album showcased a heavier Last Tuesday, with more "screaming" from Carl, and heavier guitar riffs from Ben and Steve.

Their nationally released Mono Vs Stereo debut album, Resolve, was produced by Matthew Thiessen (lead singer of Relient K) and Joe Marlett (Blink 182, Foo Fighters).

- Dear Jessica (LP-Dug Records) 2000
- Composition (EP-Dug Records) 2002
- Distractions and Convictions (LP-Dug Records) 2004
- Resolve (LP-Mono Vs Stereo Records) 2005
- Become What You Believe (LP-Mono vs Stereo Records) 2006

== Members ==
=== Final lineup ===
- Carl Brengle - Bass guitar, vocals
- Ben Hannigan - Guitar, vocals
- Chris "Tank" Murk - drums
- Steve "Blade" Gee - Guitar, vocals (left the band in 2006 and did not take part of the final tour)

=== Former members ===
- Steve Gee - Lead vocals, Guitar
- Ryan "Deuce" Jernigan - Guitar
- Bish - Guitar
- Brett Algera - Guitar
- Andy Culp - Guitar, vocals
- Mike Hopper - Drums
- Jim McConnell - Bass Guitar
- Stephen Laubach - Guitar
- John Russo - Drums
