= Influence Music =

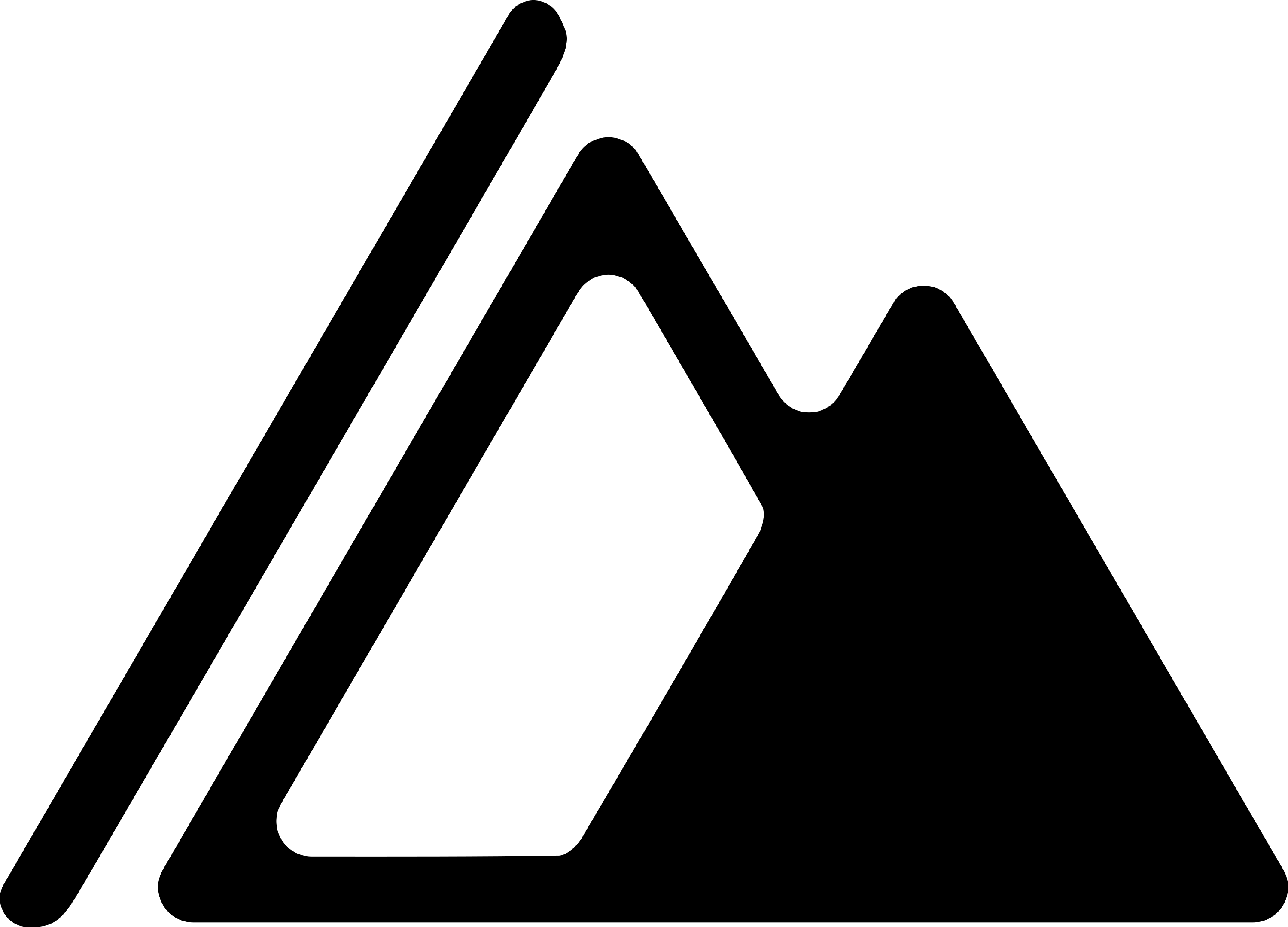
- Influence Music Logo

Background information
- Origin: Anaheim Hills, CA
- Genre: Contemporary worship music
- Years active: 2017–present
- Label: Influence Music
- Members: Melody Noel; Whitney Medina; Anjin Teal; Zach Johnson
- Past members: Michael Ketterer; Matt Gilman
- Website: influencemusicworship.com

Influence Music is an American contemporary worship music collective and independent record label based in Anaheim Hills, California. The collective leads worship in weekend church services at Influence Church, as well as itinerate ministry across the United States.

== History ==
Influence Music began in 2017 at Influence Church in Anaheim Hills, CA. The collective released one album independently, “Touching Heaven”, along with 3 singles “Proud”, I AM” and “An Influence Christmas”. Their debut album “Touching Heaven” landed Billboard Charts No. 2 Christian Albums chart, No. 8 on the Emerging Artists chart, and No. 1 Christian/Gospel genre album on iTunes. “Mistakes” Christian Radio Airplay charts, and “Spirit Lead Me,” peaked at position 38 Christian Billboard Hot Tracks. In 2018 Influence Music signed a distribution agreement with Capitol Christian Music Group and has since released other live and studio albums.

Influence Music's second live album “Rebels” was released in 2019 in conjunction with a short film of the same name. Their partnered with America’s Got Talent Semi-Finalists “Voices of Hope” on both the recording and the short film. Rebel’s was followed up with a Deluxe album that featured studio versions of several of the songs.

Their third full-length album “Ages” was the first to see CCLI success with “Glory, Honor, Power” and “10,000 Armies” reaching the top 500. The album featured Motown (Gospel) artist Jonathan Traylor.

On April 22, 2022, the collective launched its first project in Spanish entitled “Ages En Español” featuring Christine D’Clario and Evan Craft. On August 19, 2022, the worship group launched their second studio album “Before The Breakthrough”. This project included collaborations with Mack Brock and Kim Walker-Smith as vocalists.

On January 27, 2023, Influence Music launched a new brand entitled “Influence Music Kids” which aims to release Christian music for children. Their first EP was entitled “10,000 Armies” and featured Whitney Medina as the lead vocalist along with Influence Kids.

Pastor Phil and Tammy Hotsenpiller serve as the Co-Presidents of Influence Music and executive pastors of Influence Church. Melody Noel serves as the Vice President as well as worship leader and songwriter.

== Members ==
=== Current ===
- Melody Noel
- Whitney Medina
- Anjin Teal
- Zach Johnson

=== Former ===
- Michael Ketterer
- Matt Gilman

=== Guests artists ===
- Kim Walker-Smith
- Larry James Walker II
- Evan Craft
- Christine Di’Clario
- Mack Brock
- Lindy Cofer
- Jonathan Traylor
- Sean Feucht
- Meredith Andrews
- Propaganda
- Voices of Hope Children’s Choir

== Discography ==
=== Live albums ===
Title	Details	Peak chart positions			
Title	Details	US Christ	USIndie	USLatin	USLatin Pop
Touching Heaven (Live)	Released: May 25, 2018; Label: Influence Music; Format: CD, download, stream	2	6	—	—
Live At Church: Mixtape (Vol. 1)	Released: 2020; Label: Influence Music; Format: download, stream	—	—	—	—
Live At Church: Mixtape (Vol. 2)	Released: 2021; Label: Influence Music; Format: download, stream	—	—	—	—
ages (Live)	Released: 2021; Label: Influence Music; Format: download, stream	—	—	—	—
ages (Deluxe / Live)	Released: 2021; Label: Influence Music; Format: CD, download, stream	—	—	—	—
Long Live The King (Live at the Grove)	Released: 2023; Label: Influence Music; Format: CD, cassette, download, stream	—	—	—	—
"—" denotes a recording that did not chart or was not released.

=== Studio albums ===
Title	Details
Rebels	Released: 2019; Label: Influence Music; Format: CD, download, stream
Touching Heaven (Instrumental)	Released: 2019; Label: Influence Music; Format: download, stream
REBELS (Instrumental)	Released: 2019; Label: Influence Music; Format: download, stream
REBELS (Deluxe)	Released: 2020; Label: Influence Music; Format: CD, download, stream
Before The Breakthrough	Released: 2022; Label: Influence Music; Format: CD, download, stream
Before The Breakthrough (Instrumental)	Released: 2022; Label: Influence Music; Format: cassette, download, stream

=== Extended plays ===
Title	Details
Mistakes - EP	Released: 2018; Label: Influence Music; Format: download, stream
Touching Heaven - Acoustic EP	Released: 2018; Label: Influence Music; Format: download, stream
Touching Heaven - Electric EP	Released: 2019; Label: Influence Music; Format: download, stream
Ages En Español	Released: 2022; Label: Influence Music; Format: download, stream
An Influence Christmas	Released: 2022; Label: Influence Music; Format: download, stream
10,000 Armies - Influence Music Kids	Released: 2023; Label: Influence Music; Format: download, stream

=== Singles ===
Title	Year	Album
Proud	2017	N/A
Christmas Medley	2017	N/A
Soli Deo Gloria (Sarmo Remix)	2019	Touching Heaven - Electric EP
Touching Heaven (Sarmo Remix)	2019	Touching Heaven - Electric EP
Stronger (Live)	2020	AGES (Live)
Prophesy (Live)	2020	AGES (Live)
The Day That Christmas Came	2020	N/A
Glory, Honor, Power (Live)	2021	AGES (Live)
10,000 Armies (Live)	2021	AGES (Live)
Devotion (Live)	2021	AGES (Live)
Jesus (Live)	2021	AGES (Live)
Coming Awake	2022	N/A
Glory, Honor, Power (Studio Version)	2022	N/A
Gloria, Honor, Poder	2022	Ages En Español
10,000 Ejercitos	2022	Ages En Español
Straight To Your Heart	2022	Before The Breakthrough
Of Great Courage	2022	Before The Breakthrough
By Your Spirit	2022	Before The Breakthrough
ASK	2022	Before The Breakthrough
Long Live The King (Live At The Grove)	2023	Long Live The King (Live At The Grove)
Coming Home (Live At The Grove)	2023	Long Live The King (Live At The Grove)
Nobody Leaves The Same (Live At The Grove)	2023	Long Live The King (Live At The Grove)
