= Rick Founds =

Christian singer songwriter

Rick Founds (born December 3, 1954, Idaho Falls, Idaho) is a Christian singer and songwriter based in Fallbrook, California. He is best known for writing "Lord, I Lift Your Name on High" and other songs he has written include "I Love Your Grace", "Jesus, Mighty God", "I Need You", and "Jesus, Draw Me Close".

"Lord, I Lift Your Name on High" was released in 1989 and since the 1990s, it has been one of the most popular Christian songs. It has been covered many times and translated into numerous languages. In the United States Christian Copyright Licensing International (CCLI) reported it as being the most popular song used in Christian evangelical churches each year from 1997 to 2003. Since then it has been in the Top 10 list. Founds was raised in the Lutheran Christian tradition.

== Discography ==
=== Albums ===
- 2004: After All
- 2004: Everybody Praise Him!
- 2004: Carry Me Away
- 2007: Al Final
- 2007: Global Textures
- 2008: Tranquil Tunes
- 2009: Praise Classics 1 & 2
- 2009: Christmas Jazz
