= The O.C. Supertones =

American ska band

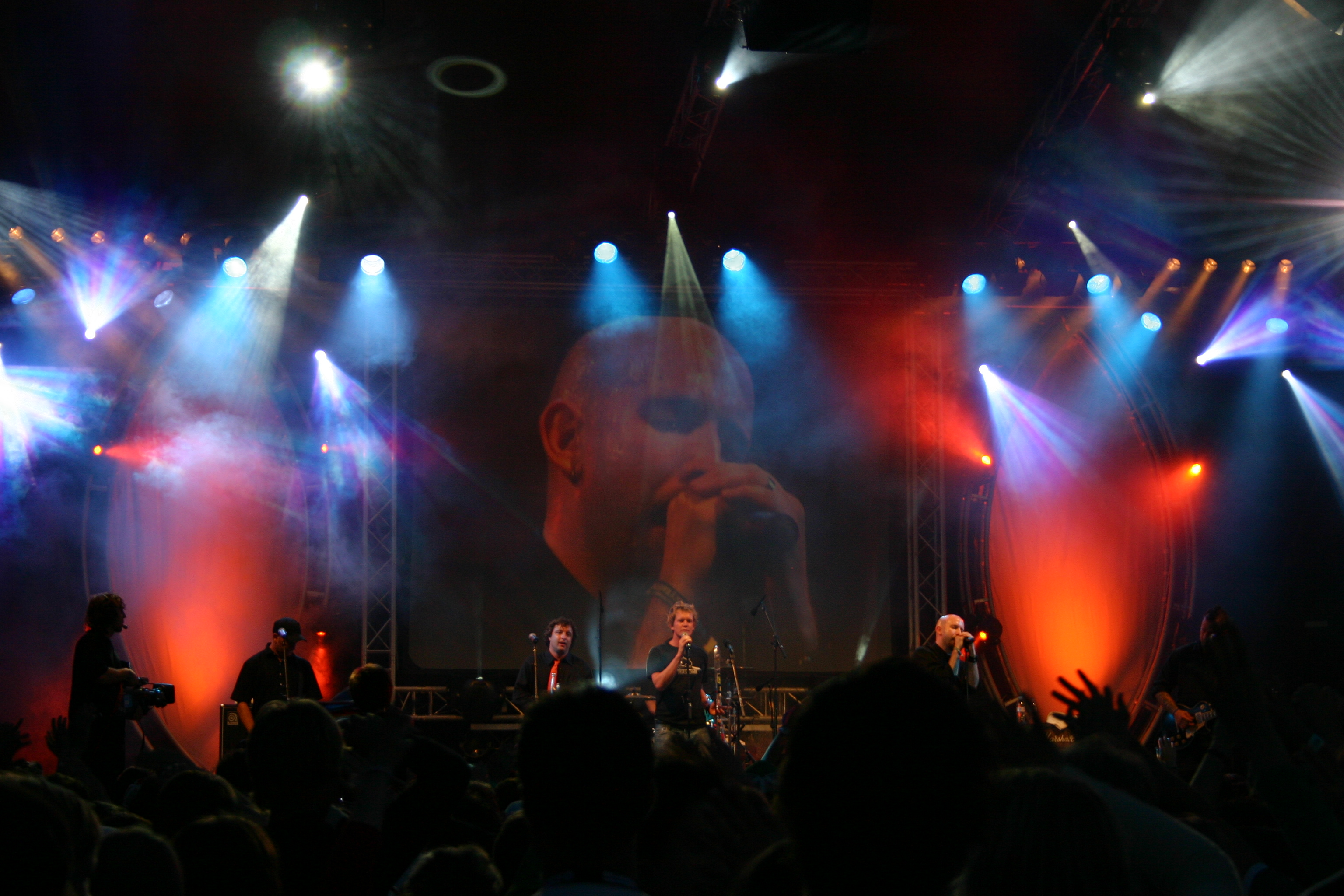
- The O.C. Supertones performing in July 2005

Background information
- Also known as: The Orange County Supertones, The Supertones, The 'Tones
- Origin: California, United States
- Genres: Christian ska, ska punk, third wave ska
- Years active: 1991–2005, 2010–2017
- Labels: Tooth & Nail, BEC
- Past members: Matt "Mojo" Morginsky; Jason Carson; Tony Terusa; Darren Mettler; Nathan Spencer; Jesse Craig; Josh Auer; Daniel Spencer; Ethan Luck; Bret Barker; Chris Beaty; John Wilson; Dave Chevalier; Adam Ferry; Brian Johnson; Ron Tennison; Kevin "Slim" Chen; Jordan Stroup; Jason Joel Lautenschleger; Tom Kieft; Gerben Postma
- Website: www.ocsupertones.com

The Orange County Supertones (a.k.a. The O.C. Supertones, or simply The Supertones) were a Christian ska band from Orange County, California. The band was signed to Tooth & Nail Records and its imprint, BEC Recordings, before becoming an independent band. The band temporarily disbanded in 2005, reunited in 2010 to resume touring and recording, and permanently disbanding in 2017. The OC Supertones were one of the first widely successful Christian ska bands.

== History ==
The band began in the early 1990s as Saved. Originally formed by Matt Morginsky, Jason Carson and Tony Terusa while in junior high school, the band played a mix of many styles including punk, rap, metal, disco, and funk. In 1995 they formed as The Orange County Supertones and settled on a ska based sound, similar to Operation Ivy or Mike Park's Skankin' Pickle. Although drummer Jason Carson had known Tooth & Nail founder Brandon Ebel for years, the label was reluctant to sign them. As characterized by Ebel: "The Supertones were good, but Saved was not good. I had years of Saved in my head."

The Supertones' debut release, Adventures of the O.C. Supertones, received a 1997 Dove nomination for the "Alternate / Modern Rock" category. Their second album, 1997's release Supertones Strike Back, was a surprise smash hit, peaking on both Billboard's Heatseekers and Top Christian Albums charts at No. 3 and No. 2 respectively. In the fall of 1997 the Supertones headlined a tour with Ghoti Hook and Stavesacre, and the next spring opened for Audio Adrenaline, with whom they recorded "Blitz" with on the Audio Adrenaline album Some Kind of Zombie, also in 1997.

In late 1998 they embarked on the all-Christian-ska "Skamania 98" tour with The Insyderz and Five Iron Frenzy. In 1999 the Supertones played for the papal visit to St. Louis by Pope John Paul II.

Beginning with a more traditional ska sound, The Supertones moved next to a harder rock sound, which eventually changed again with more of a pop-rock influence. The band explained the musical evolution to CCM: "pop culture has the attention span of a flea... ska's time in the white-hot spotlight has come and gone." When saxophonist Dave Chevalier joined The Dingees in 1998, the band made the decision not to replace his position. Rap and R&B influences also became more prevalent in their sound, which remained "about 40 percent reminiscent of the older stuff." Their next two albums, 1999's Chase the Sun and 2000's Loud and Clear, each charted on the Billboard 200 chart.

"The Supertones' main message is Christ and Him crucified. We want to help people understand certain doctrinal truths."

— Matt Morginsky in 1997.

Lyrically, they were known as having a straightforward approach to songwriting, with a minimal use of metaphor. Even so, their songs were cited as being thought-provoking and containing deep theology. One of the major focuses for the band was evangelism; they included segments of preaching in each performance. Originally these were fronted by drummer Jason Carson, who had been active in youth ministry before the Supertones found their break. In 2000 when he went back into ministry full-time the band split the responsibilities among remaining members. Adam Ferry, formerly of Plankeye, took Carson's spot on drums.

They continued to release albums until 2005, when they announced plans to break up. The band released Unite, a greatest hits compilation, and played their last show at Biola University in La Mirada, California on October 7, 2005. Former members Jason Carson, Darren Mettler and Tony Terusa re-joined the band on stage for three songs. Kevin "Slim" Chen was on hand but did not play with the band. The Supertones played for 2 1/2 hours at their final show, playing close to 30 songs.

=== Hiatus ===
On March 11, 2008 BEC Recordings, Inc. released "The Ultimate Collection," a sort of greatest hits album with select songs from each of the band's studio albums, with the exception of "Revenge of the O.C. Supertones," which has no tracks represented.

On February 12, 2008, former Supertones guitarist Ethan Luck became the newest member playing drums for the Christian pop-punk band, Relient K.

Former front man Matt Morginsky released his debut solo album, "Doctorate in Cold Rockin' It" under the moniker Mojo & the Info via iTunes and MySpace on April 20, 2008. He also released a CD entitled "Everything Will Be Made Right" with the band October Light, as Mojo and October Light.

Former guitarist Kevin "Slim" Chen now plays in the rock/pop punk band New Liars Club with former members of Gameface and the rock band Follow Your Failure.

Original drummer Jason Carson is founder and senior pastor of Encounter Church in Orange County, California.

=== Reunion and second disbandment ===
In 2010, The Supertones announced that most of the original members would be reuniting for a handful of dates that year and then going back into retirement. The ensuing tour had fifteen shows, including Joshua Fest in Quincy, CA, Soulfest in New Hampshire and Spirit West Coast in Del Mar, CA. Reunite, another greatest hits album, was released during this time as well. At the end of 2010, the band announced that they would continue to play ten or so shows a year going forward.

On March 3, 2012, original members Matt Morginsky, Tony Terusa, Jason Carson and Darren Mettler along with new band members announced progress on the full-length album, For the Glory funded via Kickstarter. "On the Downbeat" was released in advance of the album on March 9, 2012, as a teaser. The album released on November 6, 2012.

On March 11, 2017, the band announced plans for a concert on Facebook Live in which they would be performing Supertones Strike Back in its entirety recognizing the album's 20th anniversary, as well as serving as their final performance as a band. Held at Shoreline Church in San Clemente, California, the show was recorded for a live album and DVD release.

== Band members ==
Final lineup

- Matt Morginsky - lead vocals (1995–2005, 2010–2017)
- Jason Carson - drums (1995–2001, 2010–2017) formerly of Unashamed
- Tony "Toneman" Terusa - bass guitar (1995–2003, 2010–2017)
- Darren "Chief" Mettler - trumpet (1995–2004, 2010–2017)
- Nathan Spencer - trombone (2010–2017)
- Jesse Craig - guitar (2010–2017)
- Josh Auer - guitar (2011–2017)

Past members

- Daniel Spencer - trombone (1995–2005)
- Ethan Luck - guitar (2000–2005) formerly of Demon Hunter and other bands
- John Wilson - drums (2001–2005)
- Chris Beaty - bass guitar (2003–2005)
- Bret Barker - trumpet (2004–2005)
- Kevin "Slim" Chen - guitar (1995–1997) formerly of Bloodshed
- Jason Joel Lautenschleger - saxophone (1996–1997)
- Dave Chevalier - saxophone (1996–1998)
- Brian "Bronson" Johnson - guitar (1999)
- Ron Tennison (1999)
- Adam Ferry - drums (2001)
- Bram Roberts - trumpet (mid-2002)
- Jung Park - guitar
- Tom Kieft - guitar (1998–1999)
- Jordan Stroup - saxophone (1998–1999)

Timeline

== Discography ==
Studio albums

- Adventures of the O.C. Supertones (1996)
- Supertones Strike Back (1997)
- Chase the Sun (1999)
- Loud and Clear (2000)
- Hi-Fi Revival (2002)
- Revenge of the O.C. Supertones (2004)
- Faith of a Child (2005)
- For the Glory (2012)

Live albums

- Live! Volume One (2002)
- Live! Vol 2 (2017)

Compilations

- Absolute Favorite Christmas
- Any Given Day
- Veggie Rocks!
- Tooth and Nail 4th anniversary Box Set
- Tooth and Nail 10th anniversary Box Set
- Art Core Vol.2
- Cheapskates Vol. 2
- Cheapskates Vol. 3
- Cheapskates Vol. 4
- X 2003
- Moms Like Us Too Vol. 1
- Happy Christmas Vol. 1
- Happy Christmas Vol. 2
- Seltzer Vol. 1
- Seltzer Vol. 3
- WOW 1999
- WOW 2000
- Dominate in 98
- Steady Sounds From The Underground
- BEC Sampler Vol. 1
- Songs from the penalty box Vol. 2
- Unite (2005)
- No Lies
- The O.C. Supertones: The Ultimate Collection (2008)

== Charts ==
Billboard (North America)

Year	Album	US Hot 200	US Heatseekers	Top Contemporary Christian
1996	The Adventures of the O.C. Supertones	-	-	36
1997	The Adventures of the O.C. Supertones	-	-	35
1997	Supertones Strike Back	117	3	2
1999	Chase the Sun	95	-	2
2000	Loud and Clear	168	9	10
2002	Hi-Fi Revival	-	-	28
2002	Live! Vol. 1	-	-	20
2004	Revenge of the O.C. Supertones	-	-	17

== Video compilations ==
- Supertones at the Movies
- Hi-Fi Revival DVD
- See Spot Rock
