= Matt Morginsky =

American musician (born 1976)

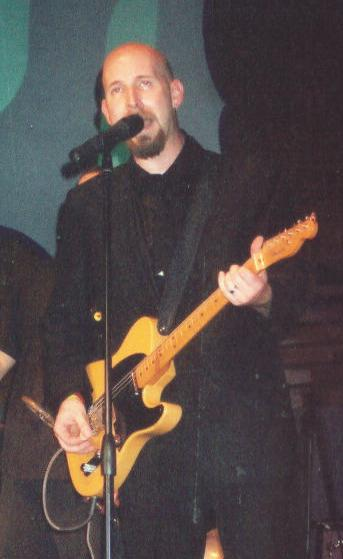
- Morginsky performing in Mayagüez, Puerto Rico, September 2005

Background information
- Also known as: Mojo
- Born: June 14, 1976 (age 50)
- Origin: Long Island, New York, U.S.
- Genres: Christian rock, Christian ska
- Occupation: Musician
- Instruments: Vocals, guitar
- Years active: 1991–present
- Formerly of: The O.C. Supertones, Grand Incredible

Matt "Mojo" Morginsky (born June 14, 1976), is an American musician who was the lead vocalist of the Christian ska band The O.C. Supertones.

== Early years ==
Matt Morginsky was born in Long Island to a Jewish father and an Italian mother. At age 14, he converted to Christianity. The following year, in January 1991, he arranged to meet Jason Carson, because he was interested in starting a Christian band.

== Personal life ==
In 2011, Morginsky graduated from Covenant Theological Seminary in St. Louis, Missouri. He served as an assistant pastor at Denver Presbyterian Church in Denver, Colorado. He lives in Denver with his wife and four children. In later years he has served as the lead pastor at Grace and Peace Church in Northeast Denver, Colorado.

== Musical career ==
=== Saved ===
Morginsky and Carson formed a band which at first was named "Saved". Ethan Luck joined the band on guitar, and Carson's friend, Tony Terusa, joined on bass guitar. During their formative years, the band had difficulty finding their musical style. By April 1995, they had decided to be a ska band, and the name was changed to "The O.C. Supertones."

=== The O.C. Supertones ===
From April 1995 to October 2005, Morginsky acted as the lead vocalist and songwriter of The O.C. Supertones, and occasionally played guitar and bass. The band temporarily disbanded in 2005. They released a new album and resumed touring in 2012 before disbanding permanently in 2017.

=== Other projects ===
In 2003, he also released an album with his and Ethan Luck's side project, Grand Incredible, in which he played bass guitar as well as being the lead singer.

In 2007, he released four songs on his Myspace, describing them as demos for his solo project.

=== Mojo & the Info ===
In January 2008, he announced that recording on his solo album had started. In April 2008, he released the album Doctorate in Cold Rockin' It: Mojo Goes to College was released under the artist name "Mojo & the Info" as a digital download on iTunes and Myspace. The album was recorded and mixed by former Supertones guitarist Ethan Luck.

In 2009, Morginsky revealed on the Mojo & the Info Myspace that he would be releasing some new songs in a joint project with Croatian Ska/Rock band "October Light", a band that he plays with overseas. They now go by the name "Mojo and October Light" and are currently mixing their new album, Everything Will Be Made Right that included a video for "Chemical Reaction" on YouTube.

== See also ==
- The O.C. Supertones
