= Contemporary worship music =

Modern genre of music sung in many churches

- Stylistic origins: Jesus music, contemporary Christian music
- Cultural origins: 1950s and 1960s United States

Other topics
- Contemporary worship, church music

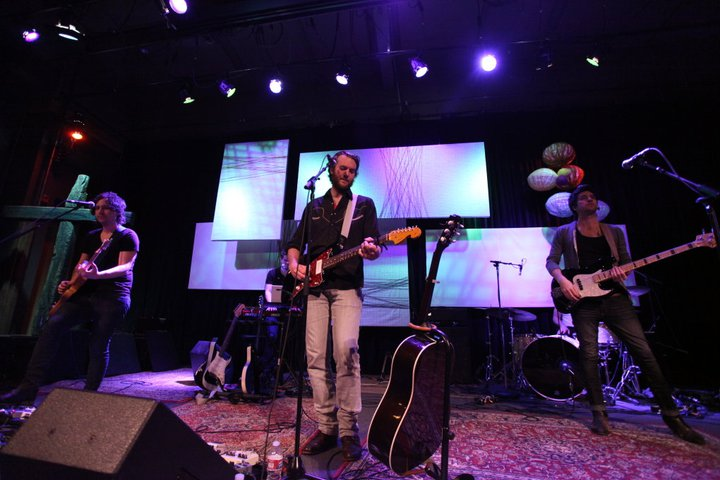
Contemporary Christian worship in Rockharbor Church, Costa Mesa, California, February 2012

Contemporary worship music (CWM), also known as praise and worship music, is a distinct genre of Christian music used in contemporary worship. It has evolved over the past 60 years and is stylistically similar to pop music. The songs are often referred to as "praise songs" or "worship songs" and are typically led by a "worship band" or "praise team," with either a guitarist or pianist serving as the lead. It has become a common genre of music performed in many churches, particularly in charismatic or non-denominational Protestant churches, with some Catholic congregations also incorporating it into the Mass.

== History and development ==
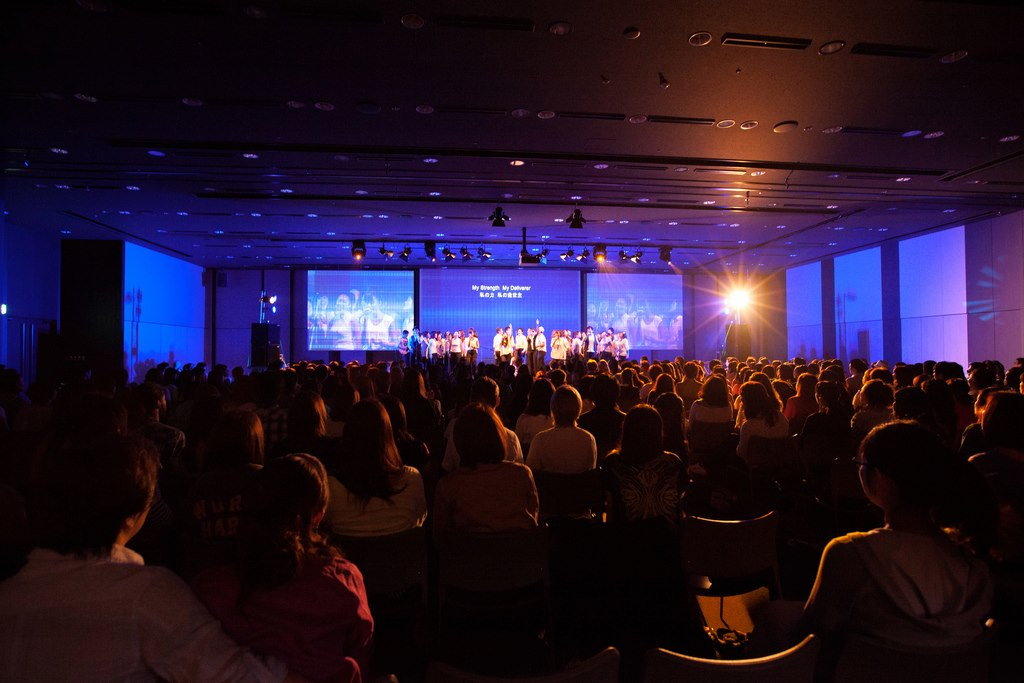
Contemporary Christian worship in Lifehouse International Church, Tokyo, August 2013

In the early 1950s, the Taizé Community in France began attracting youths from various religious denominations with worship hymns based on modern melodies.

In the mid-20th century, Christian unions in university settings hosted evangelistic talks. The Universalists and Unitarians—two youth groups—took final steps toward a merger at a convention, and in 1953, the groups formed the Liberal Religious Youth. Amateur musicians from these groups began playing Christian music in a popular idiom. Some Christians felt that the church needed to break from its stereotype as structured, formal, and dull to appeal to the younger generation. By adopting the conventions of popular music—the antithesis of this stereotype—the church rearticulated the message of the Bible through Christian lyrics, thereby conveying that Christianity was neither outdated nor irrelevant. In 1964, the U.K. gospel pop group The Joystrings became one of the first Christian pop groups to appear on television, performing in Salvation Army uniforms and playing Christian beat music.

Churches began to adopt some of these songs and styles for corporate worship. The early songs for communal singing were characteristically simple. Youth Praise, published in 1966, was one of the first and most well-known collections of these songs. It was compiled and edited by Michael Baughen and published by the Jubilate Group.

By the early 1990s, songs such as "Lord, I Lift Your Name on High", "Shine, Jesus, Shine", and "Shout to the Lord" had been accepted in many churches. Integrity Media, Maranatha! Music, and the Vineyard were already publishing newer styles of music. Supporters of traditional worship hoped the newer styles would prove to be a passing fad, while younger people cited Psalms 96:1, "Sing to the Lord a new song." Prior to the late 1990s, many believed that Sunday morning was reserved for hymns, with younger people free to enjoy their preferred music during the rest of the week. A "modern worship renaissance" helped establish that any musical style was acceptable if used by true believers to praise God. This shift was influenced by the Cutting Edge recordings by the band Delirious?, the Passion Conferences and their music, the Exodus project by Michael W. Smith, and the band Sonicflood. Contemporary worship music became an integral part of contemporary Christian music.

== Theology and lyrics ==
As CWM is closely associated with the charismatic movement, its lyrics and even some musical features reflect that theology. In particular, the charismatic movement is characterised by its emphasis on the Holy Spirit, focusing on a personal encounter and relationship with God that can be summed up in agape love.

Lyrically, informal and sometimes intimate language of relationship is employed. The terms "You" and "I" are used rather than "God" and "we," with lyrics such as "I, I'm desperate for You," and "Hungry I come to You, for I know You satisfy, I am empty but I know Your love does not run dry" exemplifying the similarity of some CWM lyrics to popular love songs. Slang is occasionally used (for example, "We wanna see Jesus lifted high") and imperatives ("Open the eyes of my heart, Lord, I want to see You"), reflecting the friendly, informal tone that charismatic theology encourages for relating to God personally. Often, a physical response is included in the lyrics ("So we raise up holy hands"; "I will dance, I will sing, to be mad for my king").

=== Modern hymn movement ===
Beginning in the 2010s, contemporary worship music with a distinctly theological lyrical focus—blending hymns and worship songs with contemporary rhythms and instrumentation—began to emerge, primarily within the Baptist, Reformed, and more traditional non-denominational branches of Protestant Christianity.

Artists in the modern hymn movement include well-known groups such as Keith & Kristyn Getty, Sovereign Grace Music, and Citizens, along with solo artists like Matt Papa, Enfield (Hymn Sessions), and Aaron Keyes.

By the late 2010s, the movement had gained significant traction in many churches, as well as on streaming services and in other areas of culture.

== Performance ==
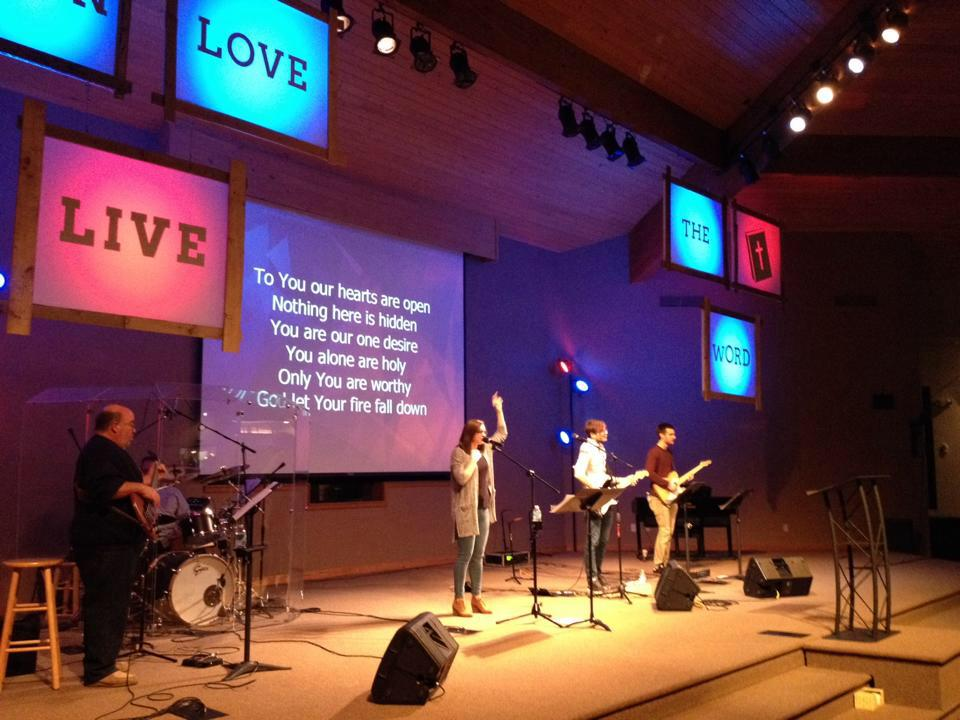
A contemporary worship team leads a congregation using lyrics projected on a motion background in addition to coordinated lighting. Harvest Community Church in Goshen, Indiana east of South Bend, January 2016

=== The role of technology ===
Technological advances have played a significant role in the development of CWM. In particular, the use of projectors means that a church's song repertoire is not limited to those found in a songbook. Songs and styles tend to follow trends. The internet has increased accessibility, enabling anyone to view lyrics and guitar chords for many worship songs and to download MP3 tracks. This has also contributed to the globalisation of much CWM.

Some churches, including Hillsong, Bethel, and the Vineyard, have established their own publishing companies. There is a thriving Christian music industry that parallels the secular one, complete with recording studios, music books, CDs, MP3 downloads, and other merchandise. The consumer culture surrounding CWM has prompted both criticism and praise. As Pete Ward discusses in his book Selling Worship, no advancement is without both positive and negative repercussions.

== Criticisms ==
Criticisms include Gary Parrett's concern that the volume of this music drowns out congregational participation and therefore turns it into a performance. He quotes Ephesians 5:19, in which Paul the Apostle tells the church in Ephesus to be "speaking to one another with psalms, hymns and songs from the Spirit"; Parrett questions whether the worship band, now often amplified and playing like a rock band, replaces rather than enables a congregation’s praise.

Seventh-day Adventist author Samuele Bacchiocchi expressed concerns over the use of the "rock" idiom, arguing that music communicates on a subconscious level, and that the often anarchistic, nihilistic ethos of rock stands in opposition to Christian culture. Using the physical response induced by drums in a worship context as evidence that rock distracts worshippers from reflecting on the lyrics and on God, he suggests that rock is actively dangerous for the Church.

The theological content has also raised concerns for some, including Martyn Percy, who argues that there is too great an emphasis on a highly intimate relationship with God. He critiques the use of personal pronouns such as "I" and "You" in place of "we" and "God," along with the use of passionate and physical language, arguing that this imbalance needs urgent correction. Percy contends that the emotional emphasis may promote hype and a need to artificially generate an atmosphere of encounter with God, rather than allowing space for God to act independently.

Despite the frequent use of Biblical justification for contemporary worship music (CWM), such as Ephesians 5:19, critics note that its culture often excludes the systematic use of the psalms in weekly worship, particularly psalms of lament. The emphasis on praise and a consistently positive interpretation of "worship" can result in neglecting more somber or challenging biblical themes. Michael Vasey observes: "Scripture is, of course, full of lament—and devotes its finest literary creation to warning the godly against quick and easy answers. The power of many of the psalms we are embarrassed to use lies precisely here. Of all this there is little echo in our contemporary reading." While many traditional denominations use a weekly lectionary that incorporates a wide range of scriptural texts—including psalms—CWM-oriented churches often lack an agreed lectionary, and thus a comparable breadth of thematic material.

Pope John Paul II, reflecting on music in worship, emphasized the need for serious artistic training, stating: "today, as yesterday, musicians, composers, liturgical chapel cantors, church organists and instrumentalists must feel the necessity of serious and rigorous professional training. They should be especially conscious of the fact that each of their creations or interpretations cannot escape the requirement of being a work that is inspired, appropriate and attentive to aesthetic dignity, transformed into a prayer of worship when, in the course of the liturgy, it expresses the mystery of faith in sound."

Some critics have argued that CWM lyrics reflect a broader cultural trend toward individualism, emphasizing personal experience and relationship with God even within communal settings. In a 2011 interview in Christianity Today, Grove City College professor T. David Gordon noted that contemporary worship music is not necessarily easier to sing or musically superior to traditional forms, but that its familiarity makes it appealing to congregants. He observed that churches often choose songs primarily based on their contemporary sound, rather than on theological depth or musical quality. Gordon also noted a trend of reintroducing hymns into contemporary services, observing that musical novelty had not historically been the primary concern in worship.

In 2014, Gordon expanded on these views, arguing that contemporary worship music cannot match the depth of a musical tradition developed over multiple generations. He pointed out that even popular modern worship songs are often simply updated versions of older hymns. He stated that writers of new worship songs struggle to produce texts that are both theologically sound and artistically rich—“significant, profound, appropriate, memorable, and edifying.” Gordon also remarked that the novelty of contemporary music had faded, diminishing its appeal as a growth or marketing strategy. He argued that the performance-oriented nature of praise teams may contradict biblical principles of congregational participation in worship.

== Popularity ==
Some songs now appear in more traditional hymnals. Evangelical Lutheran Worship (published in 2006 by the Evangelical Lutheran Church in America) includes "Lord, I Lift Your Name on High" by Rick Founds and "Shout to the Lord" by Darlene Zschech. The United Methodist Hymnal (1989) includes "Thy Word Is a Lamp" by Amy Grant and "Take Our Bread" by Joe Wise.

Songs by contemporary Christian worship groups such as Hillsong United rank in the top ten on Billboard and other national charts and are publicised in pop culture publications. Some Christian radio stations in the United States have switched to formats based around worship music, including radio networks such as Air1 and Worship 24/7.

== See also ==
- List of Christian worship music artists
- Christian liturgy
