= Christian ska =

Music genre since the 1990s

- Stylistic origins: Contemporary Christian music; Christian alternative rock; ska; ska punk
- Cultural origins: Late 1970s, United States and United Kingdom
- Typical instruments: Electric guitar; electric bass; trumpet; tenor trombone; tenor saxophone; drums

Other topics
- List of bands

Christian ska is a form of Christian alternative rock, and subgenre of ska and ska punk which is lyrically oriented toward contemporary Christian music. Though ska did not constitute a genre within the Christian music industry until after third wave ska had peaked in the general market, Christian ska continued to thrive independently into the early 2000s.

Ska music came to be seen as "an excellent vehicle for exhortation and praise due to its up front lyrical style" and upbeat, energetic, joyful sound. While there were many smaller bands, ska in the Christian marketplace in the late 1990s came to be primarily represented by three bands: The Insyderz, The O. C. Supertones, and Five Iron Frenzy; all of whom were commercially successful and ministry-oriented in their own right. As with third wave ska in the general market the sound was often intermingled with that of punk, swing, or rockabilly. In parallel with mainstream ska, many underground Christian ska bands released one or two ska based albums before completely genre-hopping away from ska or dissolving. Even the sounds of the "big three" tended to evolve. By 2002, one critic described the horn section of the Supertones as "providing color instead of the dominant sound".

== History ==
=== Early years (late 1970s through 1980s) ===
While Christian bands have played ska since the days of Jesus music, one of the first well documented Christian bands to play ska was Ishmael United, which operated in the late 1970s and early 1980s from the United Kingdom. Their sound was new wave or two tone, similar to other British bands such as The Specials or Madness. Another early Christian ska band was The Israelites, formed in 1989. They played a traditional style of ska similar to the Skatalites or Desmond Dekker. They released two albums before Christian ska matured.

=== Mainstream impact (late 1990s through mid 2000s) ===
Whereas in mainstream markets the popularity of ska had peaked about 1996, the Christian music marketplace is known for being significantly behind trends in the general market. Critics usually cite The O.C. Supertones as having been the first Christian ska band to break into the national spotlight. The 1996 Cornerstone Festival was pivotal for two of the bands which would come to represent Christian ska. Both Five Iron Frenzy and The Insyderz played and got signed as a result, though only the latter played on an official stage.

By early 1997, ska had achieved a large enough following within Christian music to get noticed by the mainstream Christian music media. The January issue of CCM stated that "the Christian ska revolution is in full motion", and that Summer the magazine spotlighted four ska bands. These were Squad 5-O (from Savannah, Georgia), Five Iron Frenzy (from Denver, Colorado), The Insyderz (from Detroit, Michigan), and the OC Supertones (from Orange County, California). Of these Squad 5-O was unique in that they were hornless, their sound would later completely move away from any form of ska, and they would eventually sign to a general market label. The remaining three bands, sometimes known as the "big three", would come to dominate the ska sound in Christian markets. Each of these bands was founded and signed to record labels in or before 1996, was commercially successful within Christian music, and outlasted their contemporaries by several years.

Each of the big three were generally characterized as having unique orientations toward their audiences. The Supertones were known for being blatantly evangelical and included segments of preaching in each performance. They also had the honor of opening for Pope John Paul II during his visit to St. Louis. The Insyderz best known for their renditions of ska-styled hymns and modern praise and worship songs, of which they released two albums, Skalleluia! and Skalleluia Too!. Five Iron Frenzy became known for their positive but serious lyrics and slapstick satirical humour. Common themes included social causes such as hypocrisy, racism, big business, as well as the renewal of faith.

Ska bands received a small amount of attention from Christian music award shows such as the Doves. In 1998 the Supertones's debut album was nominated in the "Alternate / Modern Rock" category, a classification which they denied. The same year the video for Five Iron's "A Flowery Song" was nominated in the "short form video" category. At the 1999 awards, The Insyderz cover of Rich Mullins' song "Awesome God" won in the "Hard Music Song" category. The W's won two Doves at the 1999 awards, for their debut as "Modern Rock Album," and "Modern Rock Song" for the song "The Devil Is Bad". They played a neo-swing sound with heavy ska influences. Other career highlights opening for Christian rock heavyweight dc Talk, and for the Pope during the same visit as the Supertones (although not at the main event). Christian swing music is generally congruent with the swing revival of the 1990s, and includes a small number of bands. Of all the Christian bands which took part of the swing revival movement they were the best known.

The sound became most widespread and visible within Christian music from 1997 until the early 2000s. During this period Christian ska bands regularly appeared on Billboard charts. The Encyclopedia of Contemporary Christian Music characterizes ska as being "one of the more crowded genres in the Christian market" by the turn of the millennium. While producing Skanktified, a compilation album released by Eclectica Music (an imprint of N-Soul) in 1998, Mark Morrison found over seventy Christian ska bands operating throughout the United States, mostly in underground scenes. There were in fact an exceptional number of Christian ska bands underground, creating an oversaturated market for the sound. For instance one band, the Skadaddles, released three albums in 1999, with a sound evolving from ska toward punk and emo.

A number of other bands released two or more albums to the national scene. Freeto Boat released one ska album in 1998 and moved to a punk sound for their sophomore release in 2000. In a move to distance themselves from ska the band changed their name twice and picked up an emo-indie-punk sound before signing to a major label. Flight One Eighty released three albums - one of ska, one of swing, and finally a ska-punk/power pop release. The Dingees were a spinoff band of the Supertones who play a sound which mixes punk, ska, and reggae, and have released three albums, the final one in 2001. BUCK Enterprises shows an evolution in sound more like that of the Supertones, changing their sound mix from having a dominating horn section on their national debut (1998) to one which "flirts with ska" by 2001.

The big three bands of Christian ska each continued until the early to mid 2000s. Five Iron continued to draw large crowds; a tour in 2001 drew an audience of 1,200 per night. They also participated in the Vans Warped Tour in 2002 before breaking up the following year. Their final show had an attendance of over 3,500. After a period of relative inactivity, The Insyderz released their final album in 2003 and continued to tour until 2005. That same year also saw the end of the Supertones, who had released their final studio album one year prior.

=== Reunions (late 2000s through present) ===
In 2009, The Insyderz announced they were reuniting. In 2011, they began a Kickstarter campaign to raise funds for the first album since breaking up, The Sinner's Songbook, which succeeded and the album was released. In 2010, The O.C. Supertones announced they were reuniting for the summer to play some festivals, and have since remained together. The album For the Glory was released. Also in 2010, The Dingees released their fourth album, The Rebel Soul Sound System, a heavily reggae-influenced album.

On November 22, 2011, Five Iron Frenzy announced they were reuniting and released a new single, "It Was a Dark and Stormy Night". They began a Kickstarter project that night to fund their new album. The $30,000 goal was reached in less than an hour. It went on to raise $207,980 USD, making it the most funded Kickstarter by dollar amount ever on the day it ended (January 21, 2012). Their new album, Engine of a Million Plots, was released on November 25, 2013.

Also in 2011, BUCK Enterprises played a one-night-only reunion show on December 30, 2011 in Wixom, Michigan. Squad Five-O reunited to play at Cornerstone 2012.

== See also ==
- List of Christian ska bands

== Works cited ==
- Powell, Mark Allan (2002). Encyclopedia of Contemporary Christian Music (First printing ed.). Peabody, Massachusetts: Hendrickson Publishers. ISBN 1-56563-679-1..
