= Five Iron Frenzy discography =

- Studio albums: 7
- EPs: 2
- Compilation albums: 2
- Singles: 6
- Music videos: 9
- Live albums: 2

The discography of Five Iron Frenzy, a Denver, Colorado-based Christian ska band, consists of seven studio albums, two live albums, three compilations and two EPs, among other releases.

== Studio albums ==
Release	Album	Label	Formats	Peak chart positions					
Release	Album	Label	Formats	US	US Heat	US Indie	US Christ	US Alt	US Rock
November 29, 1996	Upbeats and Beatdowns	Five Minute Walk, SMLXL Vinyl	Compact Disc, LP	—	—	—	—	—	—
November 11, 1997	Our Newest Album Ever!	Five Minute Walk/SaraBellum, SMLXL Vinyl	Compact Disc, LP	176	—	—	—	—	—
April 25, 2000	All the Hype That Money Can Buy	Five Minute Walk/SaraBellum, SMLXL Vinyl	Compact Disc, LP	146	—	—	8	—	—
November 20, 2001	Five Iron Frenzy 2: Electric Boogaloo	Five Minute Walk/EMI, SMLXL Vinyl	Compact Disc, LP	—	—	—	19	—	—
June 18, 2003	The End Is Near	Five Minute Walk	Compact Disc, LP	—	13	—	10	—	—
November 26, 2013	Engine of a Million Plots	Department of Biophysics/Self-released	Compact Disc, LP	118	—	—	8	15	22
January 15, 2021	Until This Shakes Apart	Self-released	Compact Disc, LP	-	—	—	-	-	-|-

== EPs ==
Release	Album	Label	Format	Peak chart positions	
Release	Album	Label	Format	Heatseekers	US Christian
November 3, 1998	Quantity Is Job 1	Five Minute Walk	CD	14	12
November 22, 2015	Between Pavement and Stars	Self-released	Digital	—	—

== Live albums ==
Release	Album	Label	Format	Peak chart positions		
Release	Album	Label	Format	US	Heatseekers	US Christian
November 1999	Proof That the Youth Are Revolting	Five Minute Walk/Warner Bros. Records	CD	190	6	9
April 20, 2004	The End Is Here	Five Minute Walk	CD	—	13	10

== Compilation albums ==
Release	Album	Label	Format	Peak chart positions	
Release	Album	Label	Format	Heatseekers	US Christian
April 22, 2003	Cheeses...	Five Minute Walk/EMI	CD	17	22
2014	The Second Coming of Cheeses...	Self-released	Digital	—	—
2023	It's Creative, but Not Very Funny		CD, Vinyl		

== 7" vinyl ==
Year	Title	Tracks	Label
1996	It's Funny, but Not Very Creative	1. "A Flowery Song"	Self-released
1996	It's Funny, but Not Very Creative	2. "Third World Think Tank"	Self-released
1996	It's Funny, but Not Very Creative	3. "Everywhere I Go"	Self-released
1998	Miniature Golf Courses of America	1. "Mamma Mia (ABBA song)"	Asian Man Records
1998	Miniature Golf Courses of America	2. "Arnold, and Willis, and Mr. Drummond"	Asian Man Records
1998	Miniature Golf Courses of America	3. "Handbook for the Sellout"	Asian Man Records
1998	Brad Is Dead	1. "Handbook for the Sellout"	Five Minute Walk/SaraBellum
1998	Brad Is Dead	2. "Marty"	Five Minute Walk/SaraBellum
2000	Our Finest Mullet (split with Philmore)	1. "The Phantom Mullet"	Five Minute Walk/SaraBellum
2012	Ska Is Dead, Vol. 2 (split with Suburban Legends)	1. "It Was a Dark and Stormy Night"	Underground Communique/Asbestos

== Singles ==
Year	Title	Format
2001	"Far, Far Away"/"Kamikaze"	CD
2011	"It Was a Dark and Stormy Night"	digital
2020	"So We Sing"	digital

== Videography ==
=== Video releases ===
Release	Details
April 2010	The Rise and Fall of Five Iron Frenzy: Label: Asian Man Records; Formats: DVD

=== Music videos ===
Year	Title	Director	Album
1997	"A Flowery Song"	Brandon Dickerson	Upbeats and Beatdowns
1997	"Handbook for the Sellout"		Our Newest Album Ever!
1998	"All That Is Good"		Quantity Is Job 1
2001	"Farsighted"	Reese Roper	Five Iron Frenzy 2: Electric Boogaloo
2003	"Wizard Needs Food, Badly"	Roque Ballesteros	The End Is Near
2013	"Zen and the Art of Xenophobia"	Ryan Grams	Engine of a Million Plots
2014	"Into Your Veins"	DJ Brawner	Engine of a Million Plots
2014	"Battle Dancing Unicorns With Glitter"	DJ Brawner	Engine of a Million Plots
2014	"So Far"	Ryan Grams	Engine of a Million Plots
2020	"So We Sing"		Until This Shakes Apart

== Other appearances ==
=== Compilation appearances ===
* Denotes non-album tracks
Release	Song(s)	Source	Label
1996	"A Flowery Song" "Third World Think Tank"	Take Time to Listen, Vol. II	Five Minute Walk
1997	"Oh! Canada"	Cruisin' for a Bruisin'	Asleep at the Wheel
1997	"Suckerpunch"	Gas Collection 4	7ball/VoxCorp, Inc.
1997	"Cool Enough for You"	Punk Goes Ska	Stiffdog
1997	"Where Zero Meets 15 (live)"* "Most Likely to Succeed"	Take Time To Listen Vol. III	Five Minute Walk/SaraBellum
1998	"Blue Comb '78"	Cheap Ska	Glue Factory
1998	"Most Likely to Succeed"	<congradulations@class98>	Interl'inc
1998	"Dandelions"	Gas Collection 10	7ball/VoxCorp, Inc.
1998	"Fistful of Sand"	Hey Brother...3	Vegas
1998	"Where Zero Meets 15"	The New Frontier	Soda Jerk
1998	"A Flowery Song"	Propska One	Essential
1998	"Suckerpunch"	Seltzer 2 (More Modern Rock To Settle Your Soul)	ForeFront Records
1998	"Dandelions" "Every New Day"	Take Time To Listen Volume 4	Five Minute Walk
20 October 1998	"You Gotta Get Up" (Rich Mullins cover)	Happy Christmas	BEC Recordings
1999	"Dandelions"	Seltzer 3 (More Modern Music To Settle Your Soul)	ForeFront Records
1999	"Suckerpunch"	No Lies	Sparrow Records/ForeFront Records
2000	"Ugly Day"	Know Your Skalphabet	Good Clean Fun
2001	"Handbook for the Sellout"	Notions of the Time	Asian Man Records
2002	"You Gotta Get Up"*	Ho Ho Ho Spice: A Hospice Awareness & Benefit Project	Volunteer
2003	"Kamikaze"	X 2003	Tooth & Nail Records/BEC Recordings/ForeFront Records/Sparrow Records)
1 October 2010	"Every New Day (live)"*	Ska Lives, Vol. 1	Indie Vision
2012	"Where Zero Meets 15"	Greetings From The World's Greatest Avenue, Volume 1	Colfaxavenue.com
2012	"It Was a Dark and Stormy Night"	X 2012	Tooth & Nail Records/BEC Recordings/ForeFront Records/Sparrow Records
2014	"Someone Else's Problem"	Stranger Than Ska	OneCircle
2014	"So Far"	Select-O-Hits Sampler	Select-O-Hits
2020	"While Supplies Last"	Ska Against Racism	Bad Time Records
