= Quantity Is Job 1 =

EP by Five Iron Frenzy
- Released: November 3, 1998
- Recorded: 1998
- Genre: Christian ska, ska punk
- Length: 40:31
- Label: 5 Minute Walk; ForeFront
- Producer: Frank Tate

Five Iron Frenzy chronology
| Our Newest Album Ever! (1997) | Quantity Is Job 1 (1998) | Proof That the Youth Are Revolting (1999) |

Professional ratings
Review scores
| Source | Rating |
|---|---|
| Tollbooth | (not rated) |
| Jesus Freak Hideout | 3.5/5 stars |
| HM Magazine | (not rated) |
| Teenink | (not rated) |
| Cross Rhythms | (not rated) |
| Mosh-Pit | (not rated) |
| Exit Zine | 4.5/5 stars |
| Real Magazine | (not rated) |
| Church Musician Today | (not rated) |
| Christian Music | (not rated) |
| CCM | (not rated) |
| 7ball | (not rated) |

Quantity Is Job 1 is an EP by the band Five Iron Frenzy. It was released November 3, 1998, on 5 Minute Walk, with distribution from ForeFront Records.

== Overview ==
Quantity is Job 1 was Five Iron Frenzy's first release distributed by EMI, and most of it was written in a two-week period before being recorded. Unlisted on the package are tracks nine through seventeen, which include both "These Are Not My Pants (The Rock Opera)" and a studio outtake. Musically, the album captures the band's slapstick humor style in a way that almost equates to a live show. Douglas TenNapel created the artwork. Despite being billed as an EP, the album is roughly the same length as the band's other LPs.

== Lyrical content ==
Lyrical themes addressed include unconditional love ("Dandelions"), the riots in Denver after Super Bowl XXXII ("Get Your Riot Gear"), the constant rumors of the band's demise ("The Untimely Death of Brad"). The album also contains a cover of ELOs "Sweet Talkin' Woman." Perhaps the most cryptic song is the opener "My Evil Plan to Save the World", which according to Reese Roper is about "all of us that have ever thought that our own small minds could come up with a plan greater and more perfect than God's."

"All That Is Good", which (according to one reviewer) is a reprise from 1 Thessalonians 5:21, was written in response to the 1998 Ska Against Racism tour. In it the band questions the effectiveness of their faith and ministry on those around them.

Quantity also contains examples of Five Irons' "edgy sarcastic humor." The eight tracks of the "Pants" sequence is a multi-genre "rock opera" about a pair of pants which has no apparent owner. For the sequence, which was completely improvised in the studio, each band member was assigned a style. Styles include rap, reggae, and country western, among others. The sequence, according to Cross Rhythms, "actually IS more ridiculous than it sounds!", and has been called in other places "brilliance personified".

Another example is "The Untimely Death of Brad", which is about the dangers posed by the Internet and tabloid culture. The song stems from a show where Brad was not available due to a wedding he was attending and Bret Barker replaced him on stage. Reese Roper joked that Brad was not performing because he was dead and, what happened next was "... someone made this posting on the internet that he was dead... It seemed there were always new rumors about it." The band helped to promote the rumors (in jest) by writing this song, releasing Brad Is Dead, a vinyl EP, and telling audiences that he had "passed on" at shows where he did not appear.

== Track listing ==
All lyrics written by Reese Roper, except where noted otherwise.

| No. | Title | Writer(s) | Length |
|---|---|---|---|
| 1. | "My Evil Plan to Save the World" | Kerr, Culp | 3:26 |
| 2. | "All That Is Good" | music: Kerr, lyrics: L. Ortega | 3:23 |
| 3. | "Dandelions" | Culp | 3:18 |
| 4. | "One Girl Army" | Kerr, Culp | 3:05 |
| 5. | "Sweet Talkin' Woman" | Lynne | 3:18 |
| 6. | "When I Go Out" | | 0:10 |
| 7. | "Get Your Riot Gear" | M. Ortega, Culp, Kerr | 3:45 |
| 8. | "The Untimely Death of Brad" | Kerr, Culp | 4:20 |
| 9. | "These Are Not My Pants (The Rock Opera) (Salsa)" | | 0:34 |
| 10. | "These Are Not My Pants (The Rock Opera) (Meat Loaf)" | | 0:55 |
| 11. | "These Are Not My Pants (The Rock Opera) (Country)" | | 0:46 |
| 12. | "These Are Not My Pants (The Rock Opera) (Heavy Metal)" | | 0:49 |
| 13. | "These Are Not My Pants (The Rock Opera) (R&B)" | | 0:54 |
| 14. | "These Are Not My Pants (The Rock Opera) (Reggae)" | | 0:43 |
| 15. | "These Are Not My Pants (The Rock Opera) (Cha Cha)" | | 0:50 |
| 16. | "These Are Not My Pants (The Rock Opera) (Hip Hop)" | | 1:17 |
| 17. | "When I Go Out/Kingdom of the Dinosaurs" | | 8:57 |
| Total length: | | | 40:31 |

== Personnel ==
Five Iron Frenzy

- Keith Hoerig – bass guitar, vocals on "Heavy Metal"
- Micah Ortega – guitar, vocals on "Hip-hop"
- Reese Roper – lead vocals
- Scott Kerr – guitar, vocals on "Cha Cha"
- Andrew Verdecchio – drums, vocals on "R&B"
- Dennis Culp – trombone, vocals, vocals on "Meat Loaf"
- Leanor (Jeff the Girl) Ortega – sax, vocals on "Salsa"
- Nathanael (Brad) Dunham – trumpet, vocals on "Reggae"
