= Justin McRoberts =

- Born: January 1, 1974 (age 52)
- Origin: Oakland, California, U.S.
- Genres: Singer-songwriter, contemporary Christian music
- Occupations: Singer, songwriter
- Years active: 1998–present
- Label: 5 Minute Walk
- Website: justinmcroberts.com

Justin McRoberts (born January 1, 1974) is an American author, speaker, retreat leader and songwriter from the San Francisco Bay area. McRoberts began his career writing and releasing two albums with 5 Minute Walk before the label disbanded in 2001. Since then He has released eleven studio projects, several EPs, and three books.

== Biography ==
Since 1999, Justin McRoberts has been a noteworthy presence on the independent music scene as a songwriter, storyteller, teacher, and advocate.

”In and through art," Justin writes, "we learn to see ourselves and our world as part of a cohesive, Divinely-orchestrated story." Sharing stories and songs with an audience is where Justin's gifts are most fully realized. His live shows balance intellect and emotion.

Central to Justin's work is advocacy on behalf of the poor and oppressed through Compassion International. "Not only do the poor need us," he writes, "we need the poor to remind us what being human is about. In the same way that the poor learn to identify themselves with their lack, the wealthy learn to identify themselves with their wealth. It is in the meeting of the two that we can recognize ourselves and one another as human."

=== Early career ===
Before working as an author and musician, McRoberts spent four years on staff with Young Life. During this time, he wrote songs without industry support in 1998, and he was signed to 5 Minute Walk Records. His debut album, Reason for Living (1999) was written primarily about his experiences with Young Life. The following year, he released Father (2000) which deals with the darkness surrounding the May 1998 suicide of his father. McRoberts comments that the theme of the album is "letting God fill in the space" created by personal loss.

During this time, McRoberts toured nationally with artists such as Five Iron Frenzy, The W's, Caedmon's Call, Jennifer Knapp, and others, and made appearances at the Cornerstone Festival. Since leaving 5 Minute Walk in 2000, McRoberts has continued to produce records independently. According to McRoberts, the manner in which his label had supported his work, primarily through heavy touring, set him up to continue his career as an independent artist after the collapse of the label. Through his work, he has continued to support and promote community outreach programs such as Young Life.

=== Independent albums ===
In 2001, McRoberts released his first independent work, The Untitled EP (2001), a collection of devotional songs. McRoberts purposely left the recording nearly entirely unedited, writing that, "The simplicity of the recording is intended to highlight the human side of faith, wherein life is not often refined." It is perhaps this stripped-down approach to music that he is best known for. In concert, he often appears on stage with only his guitar and no backup support.

His next work, Trust (2002), was the first full-length album he had released as an independent artist. Aimed primarily at the non-church-going crowd, the album touches on the stories of those disenchanted with American Christianity. McRoberts says, "My hope is to inspire believers to understand those who do not recognize God in their world."

Next came Intersections (2003), dealing with the opportunities that intersections in life provide for change. McRoberts says, "Much of the album's content deals with renewing the way I see the world around me; learning to recognize the eternal value in every moment, every relationship, every song, trying to cut through the utilitarian perspective I am so used to bringing to my everyday." McRoberts released Live At Grove City (2004) the following year.

In October 2005, McRoberts released Grace Must Wound. The album deals primarily with the desire for life to be easy, focusing on the Flannery O'Connor quote and title of the album, Grace Must Wound, telling us that pain is essential to a Christian's spiritual journey.

McRoberts released Deconstruction in early 2008. "We really wanted to limit the instrumentation to what was essential; let the songs breathe on their own." The record's feel supports its theme in limiting or even tearing down what is superfluous to more intimately engage in what is real.

In 2010, Justin released Through Songs I Was First Undone, a collection of song covers of songs that have touched his life.

His next project, called CMY(K), was a series of three EPs released every few months. The C EP was released in July 2011, then M EP was released in September 2011, and the Y EP released in February 2012. Following the release of the C, M and Y EP's was the artist's first published book, entitled, "CMYK: The Process of Life Together. The book released in tandem with an album entitled, K in June 2013. The CMYK Project is an examination of Life Together, a nod to Dietrich Bonhoeffer's book, Life Together, and is composed of letters, songs and reflections written over the course of two years.

== Discography ==
- 1999: Reason for Living
- 2000: Father
- 2001: Untitled EP
- 2002: Trust
- 2003: Intersections
- 2004: Live from Grove City
- 2005: Grace Must Wound...
- 2006: Christmas Songs EP
- 2007: Amazing Grace EP
- 2008: Deconstruction
- 2008: Christmas Songs, Vol.2 EP
- 2010: Father: Revisited EP
- 2010: It Is Through Songs I Was First Undone
- 2011–12: CMY(K) (A series of three EPs)
- 2013: K
- 2015 Everything Has Changed EP
- 2015 Christmas Songs, Vol.3 EP
- 2020 Curse of the Faithful EP

McRoberts is also credited with various parts on others' albums, notably including Five Iron Frenzy's All the Hype That Money Can Buy, Five Iron Frenzy 2: Electric Boogaloo, The End Is Near, and The End Is Here, Brave Saint Saturn's The Light of Things Hoped For, and Roper's Brace Yourself for the Mediocre.

== Book ==
- 2013: CMYK: The Process of Life Together
- 2014: Title Pending: Things I Think About When I Make Stuff
- 2016: Prayer: Forty Days of Practice (with Scott Erickson)
- 2019: May It Be So: Forty Days with the Lord's Prayer (with Scott Erickson)
