= Fourth from the Last =

Fourth From the Last

Studio album by the W's
- Released: July 28, 1998
- Genres: Christian ska, swing
- Label: 5 Minute Walk/Sarabellum
- Producer: Frank Tate

The W's chronology
Split EP Limited Edition (1998)	Fourth From the Last (1998)	Trouble With X (1999)

Fourth From the Last is the first album by the band the W's, released in 1998 by 5 Minute Walk. The name of the album is derived from the fact that the letter W is the fourth from the last letter in the Latin alphabet.

The album was well received, achieving No. 4 on Billboard's Heatseekers chart and "Top Contemporary Christian" charts, and No. 147 on the Billboard 200. Although the album was pulled from the shelves of LifeWay Christian Resources stores for containing "indecent" words the album eventually sold over 200,000 units. The album received two Dove Awards in 1999, first for "Modern Rock Album of the Year," and "Modern Rock Record Song of the Year" for the song "The Devil Is Bad".

The hidden track is a tribute to the band Five Iron Frenzy, performed in the style of Wesley Willis.

Professional ratings
Review scores
Source	Rating
CCM Magazine	
Cross Rhythms	
Jesus Freak Hideout	3.5/5 stars
HM Magazine	
The Phantom Tollbooth	
YouthWorker	

== Track listing ==
All songs written by The W's except where noted.

1. "Open Minded"
2. "The Devil Is Bad" (Sample)
3. "Frank" written by Todd Gruener
4. "J.P."
5. "Moses"
6. "Pup"
7. "King of Polyester"
8. "Jason E"
9. "Alarm Clock"
10. "Flower Tattoo" written by Hunter Oswald
11. "Dexter" written by Todd Gruener
12. "Hui"
  - Hidden Track (about Five Iron Frenzy)

== Credits ==
- Andrew Schar — lead vocals, guitar
- Brian Morris — drums, cover art talent
- Valentine Hellman — tenor sax, clarinet
- Bret Barker — trumpet
- Todd Gruener — bass, vocals
- James Carter — alto sax, background vocals

Production

- Masaki Liu – producer
- Frank Tate – executive producer
- Ken Lee – mastering at Kenneth Lee Mastering, Oakland, California
- Aaron James – album design and layout
- David Dobson – photography
