= So Far from Home =

Studio album by Brave Saint Saturn
- Released: June 20, 2000
- Recorded: with Masaki Liu @ One Way Studio
- Genre: Astro rock, Christian rock
- Length: 45:16
- Label: Five Minute Walk
- Producer: Frank Tate

Brave Saint Saturn chronology
| So Far from Home (2000) | The Light of Things Hoped For... (2003) |

Professional ratings
Review scores
| Source | Rating |
|---|---|
| Exit Zine | not rated |
| Freak Music | not rated |
| Jesus Freak Hideout | not rated link |
| 7ball | not rated |
| HM | not rated |

So Far from Home is the first installment in a space-themed trilogy released by Christian rock band Brave Saint Saturn. This release contains fewer elements of the trilogy's plot that was developed in the two subsequent albums, opting for a more general feeling of darkness and loneliness. It was released in 2000.

Lyricist Reese Roper shows his typical awareness of social issues, albeit with an unusual melancholy. "Under Bridges" samples clips from the Apollo 8 Genesis reading and tackles homelessness, through a contemporary interpretation of the Parable of the Sheep and the Goats. "Two-Twenty-Nine" keeps with the space theme, beginning with a clip from the countdown sequence of the Space Shuttle Challenger disaster, and relays the personal loss of his grandmother.

The album cover includes NASA image STS082-320-029.

== Track listing ==
1. "Prologue"
2. "Space Robot Five"
3. "Independence Day"
4. "Shadow Of Def"
5. "Resistor"
6. "Fireworks"
7. "Under Bridges"
8. "Data Stream One"
9. "Rocketown"
10. "Moon Burns Bright"
11. "Two-Twenty-Nine"
12. "Gloria"

== Personnel ==
- Reese Roper - Lead Vocals
- Mike Busbee - Keyboard
- Jeff Campitrelli - Drums and percussion
- Scott Kerr - Electric Guitar
- Tony Lacido - Bass
- Masaki Liu - Strings & guitar
- Big Lou The Accordion Princess - Accordion
- Micah Ortega - Turntables
- Monica Smith - Background Vocals
- Frank Tate - "Mad Rap Skills"
- Andrew Verdechhio - Drums
- Eric Wood - Drums
