= Engine of a Million Plots =

2013 Album by Five Iron Frenzy

Studio album by Five Iron Frenzy
- Released: November 26, 2013
- Recorded: Late 2012
- Studios: Singing Serpent Studios, New York City, New York
- Genres: Christian rock, alternative rock
- Length: 41:11
- Label: Department of Biophysics
- Producers: Jeremy SH Griffith, Scott Kerr

Five Iron Frenzy chronology
The End Is Near (2003)	Engine of a Million Plots (2013)	Until This Shakes Apart (2021)

Singles from Engine of a Million Plots
- 1. "It Was a Dark and Stormy Night" Released: November 22, 2011; 2. "Into Your Veins" Released: October 21, 2013

Engine of a Million Plots is the sixth studio album by American band Five Iron Frenzy, released independently on November 26, 2013. Released ten years after the band's previous album The End Is Near. Engine of a Million Plots marked Five Iron Frenzy's return to recording following an eight-year hiatus spanning from November 2003 to their reunion in November 2011.

Coinciding with the announcement of their reunion, Five Iron Frenzy launched a crowdfunding campaign on Kickstarter to help finance a new album, ultimately becoming the website's most successful music project at that time, raising $207,980 on a projected goal of $30,000, enabling the band to write, record and distribute the album completely independently. Engine of a Million Plots was released in November 2013 to critical acclaim by music journalists and decent sales, reaching number 118 on the Billboard 200 and number 8 on the Top Contemporary Christian charts.

== Reunion and production history ==
In early 2003, citing various issues including creative differences, strenuous touring schedules, and the changing religious beliefs of several of their core members, Five Iron Frenzy announced plans to disband by the end of the year. Preceded by the release of their fifth album The End is Near, Five Iron Frenzy performed what was intended to be their final show on November 22, 2003 in the band's hometown of Denver, Colorado as the members spent the remainder of the decade focusing on their personal lives and other musical endeavors.

During production on singer Reese Roper's 2010 documentary The Rise and Fall of Five Iron Frenzy, the members began discussing the prospect of a reunion which went as far as guitarist Scott Kerr beginning to write new songs for the band, though these plans ultimately never came to fruition. The following year, a fan purchased the domain for Five Iron Frenzy's website, adding a timer counting down to the anniversary date of November 22 to mark the relaunch of a newly redesigned website. This led to wide speculation that Five Iron Frenzy were planning to announce a reunion. Once the rumors reached the band members, they began drafting a public apology preparing to state they had no plans to reunite, though ultimately decided to press through with a reunion after all.

In the months leading up to November 22, Five Iron Frenzy secretly traveled to New York City to record a new song, "It Was a Dark and Stormy Night", with guitarists Micah Ortega and Sonnie Johnston recording their parts in a Denver studio. On November 22, the band formally announced their intention to reunite and release a new album in 2013, releasing "It Was a Dark and Stormy Night" as a free download and launching a crowdfunding campaign on Kickstarter to help fund the new album. The campaign's goal of $30,000 was met within 55 minutes, and over the next two months earned a total of $207,980, becoming at the time Kickstarter's most funded musical project, a success which was referenced by several news outlets documenting the website's growing notoriety.

Five Iron Frenzy performed their first show since their initial break-up on April 28, 2012 in Denver and continued touring nationally while writing the songs which would make up Engine of a Million Plots. The band recorded the bulk of the album at Singing Serpent Studios in New York in the fall of 2012, with additional recording being held at Quarter Rest Studios in Brooklyn as well as at Scott Kerr's house in Denver and Reese Roper's house in Staunton, Virginia. "Into Your Veins", the debut single from Engine, was premiered on October 21, 2013, released for free on the band's official YouTube channel and issued for digital download on iTunes and Amazon. On November 12, Alternative Press debuted the first music video from the album, "Zen and the Art of Xenophobia". Three more music videos were produced over the following year, for "Into Your Veins" (July 31, 2014), "Battle Dancing Unicorns With Glitter" (August 7, 2014) and "So Far" (November 22, 2014).

== Overview ==
=== Music ===
Engine of a Million Plots follows in the alternative rock, punk rock and pop punk-influenced vein Five Iron Frenzy began embracing with the release of 2001's Five Iron Frenzy 2: Electric Boogaloo, which both Roper and saxophonist Leanor Ortega-Till have simply labeled "rock with horns". With the lone exception of the song "Someone Else's Problem", Engine entirely eschews the overt ska influences Five Iron Frenzy was best known for on their earliest and most commercially successful albums. Many reviews of the album commented on the band's movement away from ska music both positively and negatively, something which the band acknowledged would happen in interviews leading up to the album's release. Trombonist Dennis Culp commented "I think it's a natural move forward for us. If you follow the arc of the band it makes sense where we're headed", saying likewise about the maturity of the band's approach to songwriting and recording "The parts fit a lot better[...]It feels more cohesive to me".

The majority of songs on the album were composed by original guitarist Scott Kerr, who wrote or co-wrote most of the songs on Five Iron Frenzy's first two albums, Upbeats and Beatdowns and Our Newest Album Ever!. Kerr initially departed the band in 1998 after losing his faith in Christianity but chose to take part in their reunion, now playing bass guitar in place of Keith Hoerig, who declined to participate in the reunion. Roper and Culp are credited as co-writers with Kerr on several of the album's tracks, with "I've Seen the Sun" credited entirely to Culp.

=== Lyricism ===
The lyrics for Engine of a Million Plots were the primary focus of many critical reviews at the time of the album's release, noting the "dark" and "serious" nature of Reese Roper's lyrics in stark comparison to the band's earlier work which was largely characterized by humor, pop culture references and more overtly praise-centered messages. Much of Engine of a Million Plots deals with issues of doubt, adversity and religious frustration, as well as the renewal of faith and hope. In an interview with Relevant, Roper explained that he didn't care about his potentially alienating or controversial lyrics clashing with the wider Christian music market, noting "For the most part, I think most of organized Christianity has kind of tossed [Five Iron Frenzy] off[...]What I'm more worried about is the people that have been marginalized by the Church and those fans that used to be Christians and still love us. I really care about them. I want to write an album for those people". He elaborated about his frustrations with the Church, saying "As time passes, I become more embarrassed about the Church, more embarrassed by the actions of Christians", acknowledging that the irreligious members of the band felt the same way: "They have a lot of questions and a lot of searching, and it's the same for me. So I've tried to be more inclusive in writing lyrics". Roper has also commented that there is a threaded theme throughout the entirety of the album about "being cold and in the dark versus fire and light".

Evangelical Outpost offered an in-depth analysis of the album's lyrics in their review, highlighting its depiction of a "beaten and battered" faith which emphasizes that there "are no easy answers". The review drew parallels with Psalm 22 and the Book of Job "minus the vindication at the end", noting that the album's closing track "Blizzards & Bygones" ends on a note of doubt and uncertainty rather than the praise and worship songs Five Iron Frenzy have ended their previous albums with. They wrote "As Christians, we anticipate the vindication of our faith, the fulfillment of our hopes...but in the meantime, we must endure a winter that doesn't seem to end. We must fight to keep the fire lit, and we must light it again and again".

In a series of blogs posted to the official Five Iron Frenzy website throughout late 2014, Roper elaborated on the lyrics for most of the songs on Engine of a Million Plots, though outright stated he hated providing explanations for his songs, emphasizing the importance of the listener's personal interpretation over the creator's intentions.

The opening track "Against a Sea of Troubles" references both the "To be, or not to be" soliloquy from Act III of Hamlet and the Hail Mary to "paint a picture of desperation" and the "feeling that all is lost". Scott Kerr wrote placeholder lyrics to "So Far" as a love song to his wife, which Roper "completely annihilated with stupid references to comic book characters", attempting to make the song about the need for God. "Zen and the Art of Xenophobia" is one of Five Iron Frenzy's most overtly political songs, targeting the mentality of Christian right in using Christ to justify xenophobia and similar offenses. "I really believe that the Biblical model is to let Christianity influence our politics, not to be the politics", Roper wrote in his blog, "There are few things more embarrassing for me than the endless parade of jack-wads currently using the name of Jesus Christ for political gain in this country". "We Own the Skies" was inspired by Ephesians 2 and the poetry of Robert Frost, and "is about believing that though we be mired in the thick of the worst of the world's troubles, our spirits, through Christ, can be alive".

"Someone Else's Problem" is about how American society benefits from the exploitation and slavery of people in third world countries: "As a Christian, it is abhorrent to me to think how lazy the Body of Christ has become about this. Statistically, we could end hunger – COMPLETELY ERADICATE ITS EXISTENCE THREE TIMES OVER – by just taking the tithes of the American Church, and spending it on food for the hungry...IN ONE YEAR[...]Imagine how much easier it would be to explain the Love of Christ to other people if they had actually seen us doing something with it". Roper's blog post promoted links to multiple charitable organizations, including Feeding America, Compassion International and ChildFund. "I Am Jack's Smirking Revenge" is a commentary on consumerism and is heavily inspired by the book and film Fight Club, which Roper remarks carries more truth than what "90 percent of the modern church is peddling". "To Start a Fire" was again based on Kerr's placeholder lyrics, with Roper reworking them to be about the rekindling of their friendship, which was broken when Roper was admittedly "pushing Jesus on him when he needed me to just be his friend".

"Battle Dancing Unicorns with Glitter", singled out by reviewers as the album's sole "funny song", was actually Roper's reflection on the current pop culture zeitgeist (lyrically name-dropping LMFAO's "Party Rock Anthem" as an example) of which he felt disconnected, describing it as a song about "feeling irrelevant". "Into Your Veins" was written in response to criticism regarding Five Iron Frenzy's decision to stop playing worship songs and sermonizing onstage, saying that a band and their songs are not a valid substitution for a relationship with God, as well as citing the inherent dishonesty of attempting to do such with two openly atheist members.

== Critical reception ==
Professional ratings
Review scores
Source	Rating
AllMusic	3.5/5 stars
CCM Magazine	4/5 stars
HM	4.5/5 stars
Indie Vision Music	4/5 stars
Jesus Freak Hideout	4/5 stars
Jesus Wired	4.8/5
Patheos	4.5/5 stars

Engine of a Million Plots received near-unanimous acclaim from Christian music journalists, with much of the praise delivered upon the album's lyrics and most areas of mild criticism focused on the band's continuing progression away from the humor-driven ska sound of their early albums.

Rob Houston of HM awarded Engine with four-and-a-half stars out of five, affirming it as "such a great breath of fresh air" which "comes close to songwriting perfection", lauding "some of the best lyrics I have heard all year" and summarizing "[i]f you are looking for something different than the waterfall of forgotten pop tracks, Engine of a Million Plots is a record you should listen to". Brief capsule reviews in CCM Magazine and WORLD were similarly positive, with the former praising its "witty songwriting" and the latter honoring its "literate" lyrics and "profound social gospel convictions". Zach Lorton of Patheos offered a rave review as "by far, one of the most exciting musical releases I've heard in the last year", calling its songs "some of the strongest material the band has ever created" and laying most of his praise on the production and lyrics, writing "Ferocity and energy, a sense of being alive, permeate every second of Engine of a Million Plots, and Five Iron Frenzy are marching on like nothing in the world can stop them".

Many Christian reviewers prefaced their reviews commenting how they had grown up with Five Iron Frenzy's music and inevitably compared Engine against the band's early albums. Ben Knight of JesusWire wrote that he "had a hard time accepting this new version of Five Iron Frenzy", but changed his mind after a few listens, lauding the lyrics and production and summarizing "like a lot of things that get better with time and age, this band is no different". Phil Schneider of ChurchMag wrote that Engine "might be their best" album - "the music is tight and really enjoyable[...]the lyrics are deep, challenging and hilarious" - but admitted "it's never going to be my favorite", reluctantly lamenting "it's just not the same" as the band's older material. Jesus Freak Hideout, despite awarding the album with four out of five stars, wrote "it's just not as good musically and lyrically as some past efforts", lamenting the lack of overtly goofy songs in favor of a decidedly darker and more serious tone, though admitted "it is destined to be loved regardless". A "Second Opinion" review, however, considered Engine "delivers on nearly all counts" and was "both musically beautiful and lyrically vulnerable".

Engine was not without its detractors, however, as most ska-oriented publications provided less-than-stellar opinions on the band's evolution of sound. ReadJunk expressed disappointment that "one of the best ska punk bands of the third-wave has completely abandoned that aspect of their sound", seemingly "going the way of No Doubt, Rx Bandits and The Siren Six!" in now producing "bland and downright boring" alternative rock, boldly claiming "the old Five Iron Frenzy is dead and gone". Jamie Thul of Ska Lives echoed similar sentiments, lamenting the lack of ska and overtly humorous songs in favor of "lifeless" alternative rock, "unimaginative" horn lines and "jumbled", "dark" lyrics, writing that the album ultimately "doesn't live up to all the hype".

== Track listing ==
All lyrics are written by Reese Roper, unless otherwise noted.

No.	Title	Writer(s)	Length
1.	"Against a Sea of Troubles"	Scott Kerr	3:26
2.	"So Far"	lyrics: Roper, Kerr, music:Kerr, Dennis Culp	3:27
3.	"Zen & the Art of Xenophobia"	Kerr, Culp	3:14
4.	"We Own the Skies"	Kerr, Roper	2:44
5.	"Someone Else's Problem"	Kerr, Roper	3:16
6.	"I Am Jack's Smirking Revenge"	Kerr	3:05
7.	"To Start a Fire"	lyrics: Roper, Kerr music: Kerr	3:55
8.	"Battle Dancing Unicorns with Glitter"	Kerr	3:43
9.	"Into Your Veins"	Kerr, Roper	3:02
10.	"It Was a Dark & Stormy Night"	Kerr	3:24
11.	"I've Seen the Sun"	Culp	3:02
12.	"Blizzards & Bygones"	Kerr	4:53
Total length:			41:11

== Charts ==
Chart (2013)	Peak position
US Billboard 200	118
US Top Contemporary Christian (Billboard)	8

== Between Pavement and Stars ==
Between Pavement and Stars

EP by Five Iron Frenzy
- Released: November 22, 2015
- Recorded: Fall 2012
- Genres: Christian rock, alternative rock, ska punk
- Length: 19:21
- Producers: Jeremy SH Griffith and Scott Kerr

Between Pavement and Stars is a digital EP by American band Five Iron Frenzy, released on November 22, 2015. The EP consists of several b-sides and non-album tracks recorded during the production of their 2013 album Engine of a Million Plots.

"Boomerang" was intended to be the opening track for Engine and the band's proper "comeback" song, making numerous references to previous Five Iron Frenzy songs, though Roper and Kerr disagreed on how the chorus should go. The EP version is a "Frankenstein" edit cobbled together from various takes by producer Jeremy SH Griffith. "God Hates Flags", a song condemning the homophobic actions of the Westboro Baptist Church, was released on a promotional sampler CD prior to Engine's release but was ultimately not selected for inclusion on the album. "Blizzards and Bygones (All Frost and No Thaw Version)" is a stripped-down rendition of Engine's closing track, sung and played on piano by Scott Kerr. "To Astoria!" is an acoustic song sung by trombonist Dennis Culp, which originally appeared on Five Iron Frenzy's 2014 Kickstarter-exclusive B-sides compilation The Second Coming of Cheeses.... "Between the Pavement and the Stars", written about one of Roper's friends who was losing her faith in Christ, was also cut from the album by majority vote by the band in favor of "It Was a Dark and Stormy Night".

Like Engine, critical reception to Between Pavement and Stars was largely positive. Scott Fryberger of Jesus Freak Hideout called the EP "a terrific little treat", considering most of the songs good enough to have been included on the original album. ChurchMag offered the EP its highest rating, praising the "sharp political insight" of "God Hates Flags" while also feeling the material was strong enough to have been included on Engine.

=== Track listing ===
1. "Boomerang" - 3:01
2. "God Hates Flags" - 3:23
3. "Blizzards and Bygones (All Frost and No Thaw Version)" - 4:20
4. "Into the Storm" - 3:09
5. "To Astoria!" - 2:23
6. "Between the Pavement and the Stars" - 3:05

== Credits ==
Five Iron Frenzy

- Andrew Verdecchio - drums
- Dennis Culp - trombone, backing vocals
- Leanor Ortega-Till - tenor saxophone, backing vocals
- Micah Ortega - guitar, backing vocals
- Nathanael "Brad" Dunham - trumpet
- Reese Roper - lead vocals
- Scott Kerr - bass, backing vocals, guitar, keys
- Sonnie Johnston - guitar

Additional musicians

- Jeremy SH Griffith - backing vocals, guitar, percussion
- Derron Nuhfer - baritone saxophone
- John Carmack and Abby Burell - handclaps and backing vocals
- Phillip Michael Sturgeon and James Doscher - handclaps

Production

- Produced and engineered by Jeremy SH Griffith and Scott Kerr
- Mixed and mastered by Jeremy SH Griffith
- Edited by Justin Chapman and Scott Kerr
- Album illustrations by Doug TenNapel
