= All the Hype That Money Can Buy =

2000 Album by Five Iron Frenzy

Studio album by Five Iron Frenzy
- Released: April 25, 2000
- Recorded: 1999–2000
- Genres: Christian ska, ska punk
- Length: 45:47
- Labels: 5 Minute Walk; ForeFront
- Producer: Frank Tate

Five Iron Frenzy chronology
Proof That the Youth Are Revolting (1999)	All the Hype That Money Can Buy (2000)	Five Iron Frenzy 2: Electric Boogaloo (2001)

Professional ratings
Review scores
Source	Rating
Real	(not rated)
Tollbooth	(not rated)
Jesus Freak Hideout	(not rated)
Cross Rhythms	9/10
7ball	(not rated)
HM	(not rated)
Bandoppler	(not rated)
Exit Zine	(not rated)
Decapolis	(not rated)

All the Hype That Money Can Buy is the third studio album by Five Iron Frenzy, released on April 25, 2000, by 5 Minute Walk, with distribution from ForeFront Records.

== Overview ==
All the Hype That Money Can Buy is Five Iron Frenzy's most musically diverse album, binding elements of salsa, calypso and reggae with ska. Certain tracks also contain impressions of rockabilly, metal and arena rock. Guests appearing on the album include returning member Scott Kerr, Karl Perazzo of Santana, Christian singer Randy Stonehill, Justin McRoberts and The W's members Bret Barker and Valentine Hellmam. The album contains typical Five Iron Frenzy fare, with both serious and humorous content. Even the album's title is self-deprecating humor intended to foil the audience's expectations. In the title track, the band reveals that "It's so wrong, so far from true. In secret, I'm just like you."

== Lyrical content ==
The album contains Five Iron's signature mix of serious and silly content, though it leans toward heavier issues more than previous albums. On the serious side is "A New Hope", written in response to the Columbine High School massacre. In "Giants", Roper refers to Adam Smiths' The Wealth of Nations to continue his general attacks on big business and Social Darwinism. In "Hurricanes", the vocalist laments "...and I am a failure / defeated every time..." before bringing the focus back to hope in Christ. Roper commented to HM magazine that it was "...probably the most depressing song you'll ever hear from us."

Roper also tackles issues within Christian culture and the church, taking on homophobia and hypocrisy in "Fahrenheit". The song refers to Freddie Mercury, the frontman of Queen, who eventually died of AIDS, and the superhero Flash Gordon, a reference to the fact that the score for the 1980s Flash Gordon movie was composed and performed by Queen. In a 2000 interview, Roper explained that "everyone will readily admit that homosexuality is a sin, but not that homophobia is just as bad in God's eyes." However, in a 2014 blog post, Roper recanted his statements and expressed his displeasure with the song's lyrics, writing that over the years his attitudes on homosexuality had "softened" and he no longer considered it a sin. Admitting he was "ashamed" of "Fahrenheit"'s lyrics, he wrote "At the time, I felt that I was doing the most honorable thing that I could, calling the Church to the carpet on being homophobic. I thought that I could do so by pointing the finger at myself with my own homophobia towards one of my heroes, Freddie Mercury. What bothers me is how arrogant and condemning I still was about homosexuality".

The following track is "Four-fifty-one", and when read with the previous track their names directly refer to Ray Bradbury's book Fahrenheit 451. The message in the latter track is about isolationism within Christian culture and lukewarm Christianity. Here Roper attacks commercial interests within Christianity such as the Christian music industry, of which he told 7ball, "For the most part it is meant to make [Christians] feel good and not at getting anyone saved." Speaking directly to those interests Roper states, "The radio is preaching the candy coated goo, / the record companies and the TV too. / No one rocks the boat, / terrified of trouble, / can't tamper with the walls of their sterile Christian bubble. / It was never your point to get people saved, / you pad yourself with fluff just because you're afraid. / I'm not afraid to point the finger now, / the choir's so used to the preaching anyhow."

On the more upbeat side, the album opens with "The Greatest Story Ever Told" which boldly proclaims the message of Christ and closes with the worshipful "World Without End". The album also contains examples of Five Iron's humor and irony. "You Probably Shouldn't Move Here" pokes fun at the band's home state of Colorado and at California. "The Phantom Mullet" is a satirical look at the Mullet hairstyle popular in the 1980s. "It's Not Unusual" is a cover version of the Tom Jones song. A short track entitled "What's Up" was hidden in the 3-second "header" at the beginning of the album. To find this track, the listener has to start track 1, then hold the rewind button. On the album's back cover, the track was listed as "Track 0".

== Track listing ==
All lyrics written by Reese Roper, except where noted.

No.	Title	Writer(s)	Length
0.	"What’s Up" (pregap track)		0:05
1.	"The Greatest Story Ever Told"	Culp	3:19
2.	"Me Oh My"	music: Culp, L. Ortega, lyrics: L. Ortega	2:16
3.	"Solidarity"	M. Ortega, Culp, Roper	3:31
4.	"The Phantom Mullet"	Verdecchio, Culp	2:59
5.	"Ugly Day"	Culp	3:36
6.	"Fahrenheit"	M. Ortega, Culp, Roper	3:35
7.	"Four-Fifty-One"	Culp	3:04
8.	"You Probably Shouldn't Move Here"	Culp	2:30
9.	"Hurricanes"	Culp, Kerr	3:47
10.	"Giants"	Culp	4:13
11.	"I Still Like Larry"	M. Ortega, Roper	0:31
12.	"All the Hype"	Verdecchio, M. Ortega, Culp	3:04
13.	"It's Not Unusual"	Reed, Mills	2:21
14.	"A New Hope"	Culp	2:38
15.	"World Without End"	M. Ortega, Johnston, Culp, Roper	3:45
Total length:			45:52

== Personnel ==
Five Iron Frenzy

- Reese Roper - lead vocals, yodeling
- Micah Ortega - lead guitar, background vocals, guitar solo on "The Phantom Mullet", additional bass guitar on "Giants", scratches, cuts, and abrasions, sonic booms" on "All The Hype"
- Sonnie Johnston - guitar
- Keith Hoerig - bass guitar
- Andrew Verdecchio - drums
- Nathanael "Brad" Dunham - trumpet, Rasta vocals on "Solidarity", "Four-Fifty-One"
- Dennis Culp - trombone, vocals, synth Moog on "The Greatest Story Ever Told", bells on "World Without End"
- Leanor Ortega "Jeff the Girl" - saxophone, vocals

Additional musicians

- Karl Perazzo - percussion on "Four-Fifty-One", "Giants"
- Randy Stonehill - guest vocals
- Justin McRoberts - guest vocals on "The Phantom Mullet", guest rhymes on "All The Hype"
- Kelly, Mary, and Melinda - guest vocals on "The Phantom Mullet"
- Jeff Campitelli - percussion on "Fahrenheit", "A New Hope"
- Gary Minadeo - percussion on "You Probably Shouldn't Move Here"
- Big Lou the Accordion Princess - accordion on "You Probably Shouldn't Move Here"
- Scott Kerr - guest vocals on "You Probably Shouldn't Move Here"
- Bret Barker - guest vocals on "You Probably Shouldn't Move Here", second trumpet on "Giants"
- Valentine Hellman - guest vocals on "You Probably Shouldn't Move Here"
- Mike Busbee - piano on "Giants"
- Ashley Watkins - little girl on "Giants"
- Shelter - guest vocals on "World Without End"
- Krista Nass - bells on "World Without End"

Production

- Spanish tutor - Liana Tate
- Produced by Masaki and FIF
- Executive produced by Frank Tate
- Mastered by George Marino at Sterling Sound New York
- Art direction and layout by Aaron James
- Photography by Melinda DiMauro

== Charts ==
Album - Billboard (North America)

Year	Chart	Position
2000	The Billboard 200	146
