= Ascents (album) =

Studio album by Dennis Bayne
- Released: 2000
- Recorded: 2000
- Genre: Folk
- Length: 48:02
- Label: Bang-d-Bang Music
- Producers: Masaki and Dennis

Professional ratings
Review scores
Source	Rating
Real Magazine	(not rated)

Ascents is the first solo project by Dennis Bayne Culp, formerly of Five Iron Frenzy and Brave Saint Saturn. The album is a collection of psalms that Culp put to music over a period of time in the 1990s. Inspired by Eugene Peterson's book A Long Obedience in the Same Direction, Dennis was touched so much by these psalms (120-131) that he endeavored to express them with music, and to convey their impact on his life. While some songs, like Psalm 121, are taken verbatim from the original scripture, others (such as "Table for Three") are based upon the application of the Psalm in Culp's own life.

== Track listing ==
1. "Psalm 120: Return to You" - 4:09
2. "Psalm 121: The Lord Watches Over You" - 3:39
3. "Psalm 122: I Rejoiced" - 2:58
4. "Psalm 123: Looking for Mercy" - 3:42
5. "Psalm 124: My Help" - 4:04
6. "Psalm 125: Surround Me" - 5:07
7. "Psalm 126: A Melody" - 3:33
8. "Psalm 127: Houses on a Hill" - 3:55
9. "Psalm 128: Table for Three" - 3:54
10. "Psalm 129: Tendrils" - 5:01
11. "Psalm 130: My Soul Waits" - 3:32
12. "Psalm 131: I Have Quieted My Soul" - 4:28

== Album credits ==
- Lyrics and music - Dennis Bayne Culp
- Dennis Bayne Culp - Vocals, Bass, Synth, Acoustic guitars, Piano, Trombone
- Masaki Liu - Electric Guitar
- Bret Barker (formerly of The W's) - Trumpet
- Andrew Verdecchio - Drums and Percussion

== Production credits ==
- Lisa Nikulicz - Art Direction and Design
- Melinda DiMauro - Photography
- Produced by Masaki and Dennis Culp
