= Dime Store Prophets =

American Christian rock band

- Origin: San Francisco
- Genre: Alternative / modern rock
- Years active: 1993–1999(?)
- Labels: 5 Minute Walk, SaraBellum
- Past members: Justin Stevens, Sam Hernandez, Masaki Liu, Phil Meads, Joel Metzler

Dime Store Prophets was a Christian modern rock band which was active during the mid- to late-1990s.

== Musical career ==
Singer/Songwriter Justin Stevens and Engineer/Producer/Songwriter Masaki Liu originally formed the band Radiation Ranch, a "roots" rock band with strong rockabilly influences. With Justin writing the lyrics, melodies and most chord progressions, Masaki provided the sound with an old Telecaster guitar. With the addition of Phil Meads on drums and Sam Hernandez on bass in 1993, the band changed its name to Dime Store Prophets. The name was taken from a lyric of a "Radiation Ranch" song called "Mercy Me" (the lyric was changed before Dime Store Prophets recorded the song on the first edition of their first cd).

Dime Store Prophets often opened for secular acts such as Joan Jett, Mudhoney, and Better Than Ezra. The Lighthouse described their sound as "rock music pulled from the ground, exposing its roots of folk and blues." The group's albums were released on SaraBellum Records and its subsidiary 5 Minute Walk, which were distributed by Warner Records.

Dime Store Prophets disbanded some time in or before 1999, when lead singer Justin Stevens (a.k.a. Justin Dillon) formed his own band. It first took the form of the Justin Dillon Combo, then, Justin Dillon and the Brilliantines, and later Tremolo. Masaki became a producer, working with Five Iron Frenzy, Seven Day Jesus, and The W's.

== Discography ==
Title	Year	Label
Love is Against the Grain	1995	5 Minute Walk
Fantastic Distraction	1997	SaraBellum
