= Five Iron Frenzy 2: Electric Boogaloo =

2001 studio album by Five Iron Frenzy

Studio album by Five Iron Frenzy
- Released: November 20, 2001
- Genres: Christian rock, alternative rock
- Length: 39:21
- Labels: 5 Minute Walk; ForeFront
- Producer: Frank Tate

Five Iron Frenzy chronology
All the Hype That Money Can Buy (2000)	Five Iron Frenzy 2: Electric Boogaloo (2001)	Cheeses...(of Nazareth) (2003)

Professional ratings
Review scores
Source	Rating
CCM Magazine	(Not rated)
HM Magazine	(Not rated)
Jesus Freak Hideout	3.5/5
The Phantom Tollbooth	4/5
Real Magazine	not rated

Five Iron Frenzy 2: Electric Boogaloo is the fourth studio album by the band Five Iron Frenzy. It was released November 20, 2001 by 5 Minute Walk Records, with distribution from ForeFront Records.

== Overview ==
Five Iron continued their tradition of tongue-in-cheek lyrics on songs such as "Pre-Ex-Girlfriend" and "You Can't Handle This". The album also tackles serious issues, elevating the social commentary to what HM characterized as a "new level of brutal honesty." "Far, Far Away" was inspired by The Seekers song "Come the Day" and "The Day We Killed" by Dee Brown's book Bury My Heart at Wounded Knee. The latter song references Crazy Horse, an Indian chief, to speak about racism toward Native Americans. Another theme visited on this album is consumerism in "Vultures" and "Blue Mix". "Blue Mix" specifically addresses practices of the music industry which Roper sees as disparaging when copied within the Christian music industry. Practices attacked include blue mixing, or limiting opening bands sound so that the headliners sound the best, and merchandising controls that raise profit margins at the expense of the band's freedom. As Roper stated to HM: "It really bothers me how often that happens in the Christian industry... it's not okay to do that kind of stuff." "Car" is dedicated to the memory of Carlos Ortega, brother of Leanor. It references a poem by E.E. Cummings to remind the listener that each day is a blessing to be cherished.

According to the band, "the '2' in the title doesn't signify anything, it is simply a reference to 1984's breakdancing film, Breakin' 2: Electric Boogaloo."

== Track listing ==
(Credits adapted from album's liner notes)

All lyrics are written by Reese Roper, unless noted otherwise.

No.	Title	Lyrics	Music	Length
1.	"Pre-Ex-Girlfriend"		Dennis Culp, Micah Ortega, Roper	2:53
2.	"Far, Far Away"		M. Ortega, Culp, Roper	3:30
3.	"You Can't Handle This"		Sonnie Johnston, Culp, M. Ortega, Roper	3:53
4.	"Farsighted"		M. Ortega, Roper, Culp	3:34
5.	"Spartan"		Culp, Roper	2:49
6.	"The Day We Killed"		M. Ortega, Culp, Roper	3:25
7.	"Juggernaut"		Culp, Roper	3:33
8.	"Plan B"		Culp	2:31
9.	"Blue Mix"		Culp, Roper	3:04
10.	"Vultures"		Andy Verdecchio, Culp, Roper	3:03
11.	"Car"	Leanor Ortega	Verdecchio, Culp, Roper	3:16
12.	"Eulogy"	Roper, Culp	Roper, Culp	3:50
Total length:				39:28

== Music credits ==
Five Iron Frenzy

- Reese Roper – lead vocals
- Micah Ortega – lead guitar
- Sonnie Johnston – guitar
- Keith Hoerig – bass
- Andrew Verdecchio – drums
- Nathanael "Brad" Dunham – trumpet
- Dennis Culp – trombone
- Leanor Ortega "Jeff the Girl" – saxophone

Additional musicians

- Bret Barker (of The W's)
- Aaron James
- Michael Jon Leonardi
- Justin McRoberts
- Mary Joan Thyken
- Mindy Verdecchio

Production

- Masaki Liu – producer, engineer, mastering
- Five Iron Frenzy – producer
- Micah Ortega – assistant engineer
- Bret Barker – assistant engineer
- Shively – assistant engineer
- Frank Tate – executive producer
- Aaron James – art direction and layout
- Melinda DiMauro – photography
