= The W's =

American Christian ska and swing revival band

- The W's circa 1998

Background information
- Origin: Corvallis, Oregon, U.S.
- Genres: Christian ska; swing
- Years active: 1996–2000
- Label: Five Minute Walk
- Past members: Andrew Schar; Brian Morris; Valentine Hellman; Bret Barker; Todd Gruener; James Carter; Peter Kelly; Zak Shultz; Courtney Stubbert

The W's were a Christian ska and swing revival band, formed in Corvallis, Oregon in 1996. Success came quickly to the band and their first album, Fourth from the Last, was a sleeper hit, unexpectedly having had the strongest debut of any Christian album to date for its distributor. They toured the United States several times with a variety of artists. Touring highlights include Pope John Paul II's 1999 visit to St. Louis and dc Talk's Supernatural support tour.

Their mix of "swing pop" and ska was uncommon in the Christian music industry. They were more popular within Christian music than their neo-swing counterparts such as the Squirrel Nut Zippers or The Brian Setzer Orchestra. Their songwriting was known for its irreverence and frivolity and for its reflections of the band's faith. Before breaking up in 2000, the group released two albums, topped Christian rock radio and sales charts, and won two Gospel Music Association awards.

== History ==
The W's formed as a ska band at Oregon State University in Corvallis, Oregon in 1996. The lineup consisted of Andrew Schar (lead vocals, guitar), Valentine Hellman (tenor saxophone, clarinet), Todd Gruener (bass guitar), and Zak Shultz (drums). All were attending Oregon State and were residents of Avery Lodge. The band was spearheaded and envisioned by Shultz, but he moved to Seattle to work for Brandon Ebel with Tooth & Nail Records. By September 1997 Shultz had left, and the group was joined by Bret Barker (trumpet), who Schar met through Campus Crusade for Christ, and James Carter (alto saxophone, background vocals). Peter Kelly drummed during middle to the end of 1997, but he broke his arm in a skateboarding accident a few days before recording. Kelly stayed in Philomath, Oregon, got married, and became a youth leader. The band then recruited Brian Morris to replace Kelly from a local punk band.

The W's discovered a break when a mutual friend from Eugene, Aaron James (employed at the time by Five Minute Walk Records), offered them a spot opening for Five Iron Frenzy in Concord, California. Following the CD release party for Five Iron Frenzy's Our Newest Album Ever! in November 1997, they signed with Frank Tate's Five Minute Walk Records. Within a year they produced their first album, Fourth from the Last. The album was released when neo-swing was popular. In its opening week it sold almost 9,000 units, representing over half of the total stock that had been manufactured. This was the highest-selling band debut to date of any album for Five Minute Walks's distributor, Chordant. This also placed Fourth at the No. 4 spot on both Billboard's Heatseekers and Top Contemporary Christian charts.

Despite being pulled from the shelves of LifeWay Christian Resources stores for containing indecent words (eg, suck, butt) The W's sold over 31,000 copies in five weeks, and eventually over 200,000 units, peaking at No. 147 on The Billboard 200. Fourth from the Last received the Dove Award for Modern Rock Album of the Year in 1999. "The Devil Is Bad" was The W's hit single from the record. It peaked at No. 1 and No. 6 on the Christian rock and hits radio and charts respectively, and won the Dove for Modern Rock Recorded Song in 1999. The song was also released on the double Platinum certified annual compilation WOW 1999.

The W's appeared on 7ball in November 1998.

In late 1998 the band appeared on the cover of 7ball magazine (pictured right), representing the widest media coverage the band garnered throughout their career. The cover reflects the visual signature of the band at the time. Fourth from the Last was themed around bowling, a sport which band member had mixed feelings about. At least one member (Todd Gruener) was said to hate the sport, while Andrew Schar had played in a league. Closing out 1998, the band played some dates with one of their mainstream counterparts, Big Bad Voodoo Daddy, and alternative band Cracker.

They played at Pope John Paul II's visit to St. Louis in January. From late that month until May the band opened for Christian rock group dc Talk on their Supernatural Experience tour. During this time "Moses" entered Christian radio as a second single and peaked at No. 3 on the Christian rock radio charts. That May the band went into the studio to record their second and final album, Trouble With X. Summer brought further touring and appearances at Christian music festivals. That fall the band embarked on the national Holy Roller Tour with The Insyderz, Five Iron Frenzy, and Justin McRoberts. Shows on this tour were held at roller skating rinks across the country.

In November Trouble With X was released, peaking at No. 21 and No. 25 on the Billboard Heatseekers and Top Contemporary Christian charts respectively. Some copies of Trouble With X included "The Rumor Weed Song", which was made for the episode Larry-Boy and the Rumor Weed of the children's video series VeggieTales. The song was also included on the WOW 2000 compilation, which also achieved double Platinum sales.

Touring continued in 2000 alongside labelmates Five Iron Frenzy, Philmore, and Soul-Junk. Drummer Brian Morris departed and was replaced by Courtney Stubbert. The W's commenced recording for a third album, though it was never released. One song from the sessions, "Somewhere Between the Devil and the Deep Blue Sea" was released on the compilation Take Time to Listen Volume 5. The W's broke up in December 2000, citing artistic differences.

=== After the break up ===
Some members continued to produce music following the demise of The W's. Gruener and Morris joined Corvallis friend Mark Cleaver in the indie band Bendixon. Bendixon released two albums, Bendixon (1999) and Slaying of the Dragon (2000). Their sound was comparable to Weezer or All Star United, and like The W's most of their songs could be considered fun or witty. Schar and Stubbert formed the band Alpha Charlie and released one album, ...and I wait (2002), before breaking up in 2004. Early member Shultz moved to Los Angeles in 1997.

Bret Barker and Valentine Hellman appeared on Five Iron Frenzy's 2000 album All the Hype That Money Can Buy. Barker appeared on Dennis Culp's solo album, Ascents (2000), Five Iron Frenzy 2: Electric Boogaloo (2001) in both the additional musician credits and as a recording engineer, and as an engineer on The End Is Near (2003). Barker joined The O.C. Supertones in 2004 and played with them until their breakup the following year.

== Style ==
The W's "The Devil Is Bad" (1998)
Sample from The W's "The Devil Is Bad".

The music of The W's is similar to Big Bad Voodoo Daddy, Royal Crown Revue, and The O.C. Supertones, but less ska-based than the latter. HM Magazine commented that "the closest thing in the Christian market was Ralph Carmichael's big band project" (Strike Up the Band, 1995). Though they were often cited as third wave ska or swing revival, their overall sound did not fit neatly into any musical genre. Band members generally agreed with this assessment: Andrew Schar noted that "Our music gets labeled swing, but we're not really swing", and sax player James Carter, "I think 'swing' and 'ska' are just terms people are comfortable using. I don't think they completely describe the music we play at all". Bass player Gruener described their music as "kinda ska, kinda swing, kinda rockabilly, kinda crazy, kinda punky". Cross Rhythms provides the most concise explanation: "This is Swing Ska!".

"Bands like The Supertones have a different goal than us. They seem to focus on the church... We want to reach the kids who don't go for that kind of thing."

— Valentine Hellman on the purpose of Fourth from the Last' s lyrics.

Reviewers, who noted a lack of depth in songwriting, regarded both of The W's albums as "fun". CCM reported that lyrically, their songs "swing between subtle spirituality and general goofiness." Elsewhere this style was described as "an odd marriage of reverence for God with forced attempts at irreverent wackiness." While the Encyclopedia of Contemporary Christian Music cites this as a "subdued approach to ministry", other commentators saw it as a disappointing lack of spiritual message, especially on Trouble With X.

Trouble was much more themed on Christianity than their debut, although its nature was philosophical rather than spiritual. Characterized by James Carter, "The last album, we wrote about our everyday lives... the majority of the songs were about skateboarding and stories we made up. This album, pretty much every song is about Christianity." The band leveled criticism at the church and Christians generally, sometimes using sarcasm, reminding one reviewer of Steve Taylor. "Tip from Me" is about breaking broad perceptions of Christianity and the Church. The purpose of the song was to acknowledge problems with the church, say to the non-Christian that "Yeah, we see the problems too," and a call to the Christian to act to fix them. In the song "Stupid" the band used the example of abortion clinic bombings (see, for example Eric Robert Rudolph) to make a pronounced statement about hypocrisy.

Several songs draw directly from biblical stories. The song "Moses" is about struggles with faith and insignificance. It draws inspiration from several biblical figures and stories, including Moses' Burning bush, Gideon, Peter's denial of Christ, and Paul's role in the death of Stephen to show how God can use anybody for his purposes. "Used Car Salesman" paints a colorful description of the Devil, selling sins as used Hondas.

Other songs, such as "Dexter", and "Frank" retell parts of the lives of band members. "J.P." tells about how a friend of Valentine Hellman encouraged him to leave the party scene and rededicate his life to Christ. "Hui" retells the 1987 film North Shore. More mundane topics include the hardships of school ("101") and of touring and making music professionally ("Two More Weeks", "Open Minded"). Another notable song was their cover of John Denver's "Country Roads", which some thought worked well as a swing tune.

== Discography ==
=== Albums ===
- 1998 Fourth from the Last
- 1999 Trouble With X
