= Sarah Bellum =

Sarah Bellum or Sara Bellum may refer to:

- Animated fictional characters:
  - Sara Bellum (The Powerpuff Girls), mayor's secretary in Cartoon Network series
  - Sara Bellum (Where on Earth Is Carmen Sandiego?), in animated television series.
  - Sara Bellum (Darkwing Duck), scientist in Disney series.
- SaraBellum Records, sublabel of 5 Minute Walk
- In the credits to A Prairie Home Companion, Garrison Keillor states the show is "written by Sarah Bellum" in a joking reference to his own brain (cerebellum)
  - Sarah Bellum (The Magic School Bus Rides Again), a character in the eleventh episode.

== See also ==
- Cerebellum, a structure at the rear of the vertebrate brain, beneath the cerebrum
