= Scum of the Earth Church =

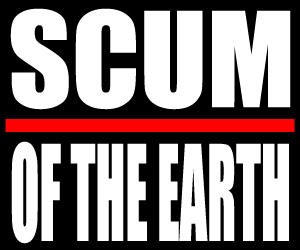
- Address: 935 W. 11th Avenue, Denver, Colorado
- Country: US
- Denomination: Non-denominational
- Website: scumoftheearth.net

History
- Founded: 2000

Scum of the Earth Church (SOTEC or Scum) was a non-denominational Christian church based in Lincoln Park neighborhood, Denver, Colorado. Its name is taken from 1 Corinthians 4:11-13, which includes Paul the Apostle's statement, "We have become the scum of the earth."

SOTEC's vision was to be "an outpost on the perimeter of God's kingdom seeking redemption in Jesus Christ". Its unusual name and explicit mission statement of outreach to excluded young adults has attracted comment from both religious and non-religious sources.

== History ==
Scum of the Earth Church was founded by Mike Sares and Five Iron Frenzy vocalist Reese Roper in February 2000. The initial idea grew out of a Bible study led by Sares, who had left his role with a Presbyterian church in Denver. In Sares's recollection,

Several people who had been attending ... wanted to find ways to minister to young people who felt like outcasts and would never "darken the doors of a traditional church - people like skateboarders, goths, punk rockers, and the tattooed and pierced crowd ...

Sares and Roper then "decided to stop talking about such a church and go ahead and start one." The name was suggested by a member of the study group, adopted by Sares after some hesitation. It is based on 1 Corinthians 4:11-13, (NIV translation):

To this very hour we go hungry and thirsty, we are in rags, we are brutally treated, we are homeless. We work hard with our own hands. When we are cursed, we bless; when we are persecuted, we endure it; when we are slandered, we answer kindly. We have become the scum of the earth, the garbage of the world - right up to this moment.

Initial meetings were held at a coffee shop. But continued growth led to several location changes, and in September 2008, through substantial donations from outside supporters, the church purchased its own building at 935 W. 11th Avenue, in the Santa Fe Arts District.

Following a gradual decline in numbers and the departure of most of its staff members, the church's final worship service was held on November 10th, 2024. Former head pastor Mike Sares returned to preach from the book of Lamentations, and the service closed with an acoustic rendition of Five Iron Frenzy's song Every New Day.

== Mission ==
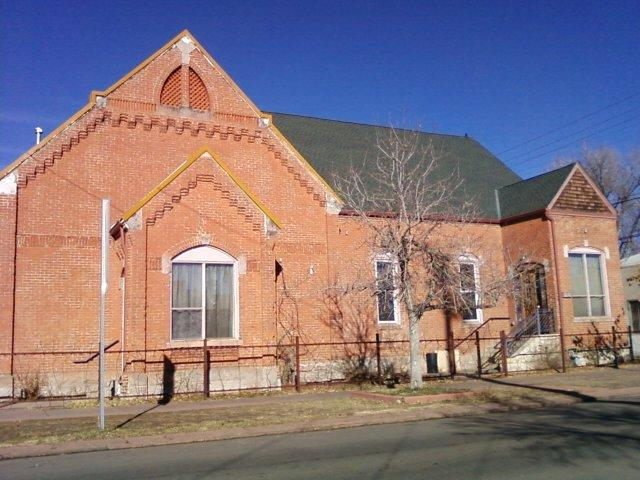
Scum of the Earth Church, in Denver

Sares, the church's first pastor, said that they wanted "to build a place where folks who didn't fit in other church settings would actually feel welcome."

The church's website expands:

Whether outcast by society (e.g., punks, skaters, ravers, homeless people…) or by the church itself, many who come can identify with the name "Scum of the Earth" since they have been previously treated as such. More important to us, however, the name implies that being people of faith does not mean we are better than anyone else.

Writer Bob Whitesel described the church's congregation on a visit:

[the] urban poor, homeless, disenfranchised youth, [g]oths, skateboarders, urban artists, immigrant [and] blue-collar families, seminary students/professors, and diverse social classes throughout and around Denver.

== Teaching and programs ==
The church prides itself on running a range of programs and classes as well as regular worship meetings. These include podcasts, art exhibitions, classes on creative writing, a photographic gallery of its activities; and various other activities.

The church has hosted various visiting teachers, including:

- Craig Blomberg, a Denver Seminary professor;
- Douglas Groothius, a Denver Seminary professor;
- Trevor Bron, former pastor at The Next Level church;
- Bob Belz of Walden Media;
- Margaret Feinburg, author and speaker; and
- Susan Isaacs, author and actor.

== Impact and Criticism ==
SOTEC has attracted comment from a range of religious and non-religious quarters. The church has been categorized as "emergent" or placed within the movement of "Emergent Church[es]", and has reportedly inspired the founding of other churches related in style and temperament, including 'The Refuse' church, based in Colorado Springs, Colorado. In 2006, Scott Bader-Saye argued that the seeming radical aspects of SOTEC, and the "innovation" involved in its appeal to fringe elements of society, were "not fundamentally different from traditional evangelicalism."

In their 2009 book God is Back: How the Global Revival of Faith is Changing the World (2009) journalists John Micklethwait and Adrian Woolridge refer to SOTEC as being part of America's landscape of niche worship communities, catering to unique demands: "the real strength of religious America lies in its diversity'...Religious America is remarkably good at segmenting its customer base"

In 2011, political commentator Pat Buchanan, writing in Suicide of a Superpower: Will America Survive to 2025?, implicitly criticizes SOTEC, using it as an example to ask "is this a manifestation of the 'real strength' of Christianity, or does it instead, sound like disintegration, the loss of the unity of the People of God?"
