= Upbeats and Beatdowns =

Studio album by Five Iron Frenzy
- Released: November 29, 1996
- Recorded: September 2–10, 1996
- Studio: One Way (Concord, California)
- Genre: Christian ska
- Length: 47:25
- Label: 5 Minute Walk; SaraBellum; WEA
- Producer: Masaki Liu

Five Iron Frenzy chronology
| It's Funny but Not Very Creative (1996) | Upbeats and Beatdowns (1996) | Our Newest Album Ever! (1997) |

Professional ratings
Review scores
| Source | Rating |
|---|---|
| AllMusic | 3/5 stars |
| Cornerstone | |
| Cross Rhythms | |
| Jesus Freak Hideout | 3.5/5 stars |
| Real Magazine | |
| YouthWorker | |

Upbeats and Beatdowns is the first full-length album of the band Five Iron Frenzy. It was originally released independently on November 29, 1996 before receiving a national release on April 8, 1997, on 5 Minute Walk, under the SaraBellum imprint, with distribution from WEA.

== Overview ==
The lyrics were generally received as being "relevant and forceful;" one reviewer commented that the band offered praise and worship "by the pound." The first track, "Old West", begins one of many themes that would recur on the band's subsequent releases. The track is critical of the ill treatment of Native Americans in the name of Christ, and the liner notes implore us to learn from the Sand Creek and Meeker massacres.

According to the Five Iron Frenzy MySpace blog, "Milestone" is often given the title "Nintendo" due to an incorrectly named mp3 distributed on file-sharing networks.

"A Flowery Song," was nominated for a Dove Music Award in the "Short Form Music Video of the Year" category. The video was filmed in Albuquerque, south of the band's hometown of Denver. Its content included an unusually energetic, raucous scene, in which volunteers wearing colorful costumes danced down a suburban street. These costumes were not obviously connected to the lyrical content of the video, and ranged from Disney princesses skipping to an Ace of Hearts aggressively dance-punching the air.

== Track listing ==
All music written by Scott Kerr and Dennis Culp and all lyrics written by Reese Roper, except where noted otherwise.

| No. | Title | Writer(s) | Length |
|---|---|---|---|
| 1. | "The Old West" | | 2:20 |
| 2. | "Where Zero Meets 15" | Kerr | 3:04 |
| 3. | "Cool Enough for You" | | 3:45 |
| 4. | "Anthem" | Kerr | 2:43 |
| 5. | "Faking Life" | lyrics: L. Ortega | 2:49 |
| 6. | "Shut Up" | | 0:06 |
| 7. | "Arnold & Willis & Mr. Drummond" | Kerr | 2:36 |
| 8. | "I Feel Lucky" | Kerr | 3:18 |
| 9. | "Milestone" | | 3:12 |
| 10. | "Beautiful America" | Culp, Bernstein, Sondheim | 3:43 |
| 11. | "Combat Chuck" | | 2:09 |
| 12. | "Amalgamate" | | 2:58 |
| 13. | "Everywhere I Go" | Kortes | 2:16 |
| 14. | "A Flowery Song" | | 3:40 |
| 15. | "Third World Think Tank" | Kerr, Hoerig | 8:42 |
| 16. | "Combat Chuck's Call" | | 0:07 |
| Total length: | | | 47:25 |

== Personnel ==
Five Iron Frenzy

- Leanor Ortega - saxophone, background vocals
- Nathanael Dunham - trumpet, background vocals
- Dennis Culp - trombone, background vocals, lead vocals on "Beautiful America"
- Scott Kerr - guitar, background vocals
- Keith Hoerig - bass
- (Andrew Verdecchio) - drums
- Micah Ortega - guitar
- Reese Roper - lead vocals

Additional personnel

- Jamie Awbrey – rooster crow on "A Flowery Song"
- Masaki Liu – producer, mixing, background vocals on "Beautiful America"
- Edith Bunker – background vocals on "I Feel Lucky"
- Frank Tate – executive producer
