= My Brother's Mother =

- Years active: 1995–1996
- Labels: 5 Minute Walk

My Brother's Mother was a Christian band from Southern California. Their only album, Deeper Than Skies, was released in 1995 on Five Minute Walk, and was the first release by that label. The band was formed by Jamie Eichler of the Violet Burning, Dean Tapia, Andrew Prickett of The Prayer Chain, and [Jamie's] husband Brian Eichler.

For a time the band was a worship band for Vineyard Church, and this was reflected in their music in many ways. Their music was said to have an "acoustic slant" and a strong emotional pull, helped along by female vocalist Jamie Eichler. Overall their sound was similar to that of Over the Rhine or Innocence Mission.

In early 1996 they toured with the Lost Dogs.

== Discography ==
- 1995: Deeper Than Skies

== Members ==
- Andrew Prickett - guitar
- Chris Lizotte - vocals, guitar
- Dean Tapia - bass, fretless bass
- Jamie Eichler - vocals
- Brian Eichler - drums
