= Brace Yourself for the Mediocre =

Studio album by Roper
- Released: October 19, 2004
- Recorded: 2004, One Way Studio
- Genre: Pop punk
- Length: 42:59
- Label: Five Minute Walk
- Producer: Frank Tate

Professional ratings
Review scores
Source	Rating
Jesus Freak Hideout	link
Christianity Today	link
The Phantom Tollbooth	link
Decapolis	link
Renown Magazine	link
The Hearing Aide	(5.6/10) link
Wise Men Promotions	(not rated) link
HM Magazine	(not rated)

Brace Yourself for the Mediocre is the first and only album of the band Roper, released October 19, 2004. It was put together by lead singer Reese Roper before he had put the rest of the band together. The album has a pop punk sound, although HM comments that it "has much more in common with the raw side than... with Simple Plan or Relient K.

The albums contains lyrics that avoid the clichés of pop punk and deliver scathing wit alongside representations of faith, typical of Reese Roper.

== Track listing ==
1. "Hello Lamewads" – 3:16
2. "You're With Stupid" – 2:27
3. "Amplify" – 3:59
4. "Vendetta" – 3:47
5. "Red Eye to Miami" – 2:56
6. "Quicksilver" – 3:21
7. "1985" – 3:20
8. "Say Sayonara" – 3:32
9. "How Your Halo Fell" – 3:30
10. "Day of Pigs" – 2:37
11. "Fireflies" – 3:28
12. "You're Still The One" (Shania Twain cover) – 2:57
13. "In Excelsis Deo" – 3:42

== Personnel ==
Additional Music

- Drums: Frank Lenz, Jason White
- Bass: Elijah Thomson
- Organ: Phil Bennett
- Guitar: Bob Schiveley, Ethan Luck

Additional Vocals

- Adam Davis
- Sam Hernandez
- Mick Leonardi
- Justin McRoberts
- Eli Salazar
- Dennis Simmons
- Jason White
- Dan Romero
- Illustrations: Barak Hardley

Touring Band Lineup

- Reese Roper: Vocals, Nord
- Johnathan Till: Bass Guitar
- Jonathan Byrnside: Lead Guitar
- Matt "emo" Emmett: Rhythm Guitar, Backup Vocals
- Nick White: Drums

== Charts ==
Album - Billboard (North America)

Year	Chart	Position
2004	Top Heatseekers	46
