= Our Newest Album Ever! =

Studio album by Five Iron Frenzy
- Released: November 11, 1997
- Recorded: September 1997
- Studio: One Way
- Genres: Christian ska, ska punk
- Length: 46:52
- Labels: 5 Minute Walk; SaraBellum; WEA
- Producers: Masaki Liu, Five Iron Frenzy

Five Iron Frenzy chronology
Upbeats and Beatdowns (1996)	Our Newest Album Ever! (1997)	Miniature Golf Courses of America (1998)

Professional ratings
Review scores
Source	Rating
AllMusic	3/5 stars
The Phantom Tollbooth	4
Squares Music Online	
Real Magazine	
Jesus Freak Hideout	
Alternative Press	
YouthWorker	
7ball	

Our Newest Album Ever! is the second full-length studio album released by the band Five Iron Frenzy. Its street date was November 11, 1997, on 5 Minute Walk, under the SaraBellum imprint, with distribution from WEA.

== Overview ==
Musically, the band set out to differentiate itself from other third wave ska groups, an effort that was met with mixed results. An AllMusic reviewer found that the band's approach was "status quo", pointing out that the sound of "Handbook for the Sellout" was similar to Reel Big Fish's "Sell Out." Another reviewer found that the artwork (which was made by Doug TenNapel) and production were superior to the masses of ska bands that had begun to flood the market. In any event, the music is an evolution from the sound found on the group's debut, moving toward a less-punkish feel and incorporating more intricate horn arrangements.

While the album contains a number of references to pop culture items, it uses them to make serious points about society and Christianity. One reviewer compares the effect to the lyrics of Steve Taylor, commenting that Five Iron Frenzy should be known as "the thinking person's ska outfit." Even when used to comic effect, several reviewers indicated that the band's lyrics contain serious messages underneath. Despite the band's religious label, however, Five Iron's approach to issues was perceived as relevant and non-preachy.

Five Iron Frenzy also set itself apart visually by avoiding the checker motif associated with ska.

=== Lyrical content ===
The content of Our Newest Album Ever! continues several topical threads that the band had begun to explore on their debut album. "Banner Year" takes on the thread of historical mistreatment of Native Americans. Specifically, it references the Sand Creek massacre of 1864, which was an attack led by Colonel John Chivington against an encampment under chief Black Kettle. According to Reese Roper, the song contains a hidden meaning—Black Kettle waved the American Flag which couldn't save him, Christians fall under God's banner, and in Him they find salvation.

Other songs take on a more personal tone. "Blue Comb '78" relays an early memory of the vocalist, about how he lost a prized possession, as an allegory for loss of innocence. The band received thousands of blue combs from fans throughout their career. At their final show, released as The End Is Here, the band lamented "You don't know how many times we wished we'd named that 'Have You Seen My Dollar'... We failed'."

"Fistful of Sand" draws its inspiration from the book of Ecclesiastes, echoing a representation of the futility of life without God. "Second Season" takes a similar thread, explaining that "The strongest will expire just the same... Try to make my shoulders broad, but I am helpless without God."

The band also takes on itself, examining its own success and members. In "Superpowers" the band humorously describes the trials of life on the road, the trials of the music business, and also describing the band's own purpose, "...I just want to share with you, how we got this peace and hope." In doing so the song references Holden Caulfield, a fictional character from the novel The Catcher in the Rye, and Jack Kerouac, a beatnik author and poet. "Where Is Micah?" invokes the image of John Walsh, host of America's Most Wanted, to roast guitarist Micah Ortega for his constant absence from practices.

"Superpowers" is not the only music industry-themed song. "Litmus" takes a swipe at the band's critics within the Christian music industry, with a message that the amount of "Godliness" cannot be resolved through clean-cut measures. "You say preach, they say rock. You put my God inside a box," the lyricist states. Another cut along the same lines is the opening track, "Handbook For The Sellout."

"Suckerpunch" is about how even "rejects" and "misfits" like nerdy teenagers are loved and accepted by God. It echoes the "God is in your corner" theme that is also espoused on "Banner Year."

"Oh, Canada" takes a Tongue-in-cheek look at Canada. The song makes reference to the country as "the maple leaf state," and mentions elements associated with the country including lemmings, mooses, yaks, elements of French Canadian culture, Royal Mounties, Slurpees made of Venison, and Canada-native William Shatner.

The album closes with the worshipful "Every New Day." One reviewer called it without a doubt the best song on the album", noting in retrospect that it closed many of their shows up until the band disbanded. The song is about how daily life and daily struggles can obscure faith. The song draws two lines from The Tyger, a poem by William Blake. The musical melody of the outro horn line contains similarities to the ending vocal melody from the Nerf Herder song "Golfshirt". This horn line was rewritten for the "Winners Never Quit" tour. The end of the song was reprised on "On Distant Shores", the final track of the band's last studio album, The End Is Near.

Following "Every New Day" is the hidden track, "Godzilla".

== Track listing ==
All music composed by Scott Kerr and Dennis Culp and all lyrics written by Reese Roper, except where noted otherwise

No.	Title	Writer(s)	Length
1.	"Handbook for the Sellout"		3:28
2.	"Where is Micah?"	Kerr	2:55
3.	"Superpowers"		3:23
4.	"Fistful of Sand"		4:18
5.	"Suckerpunch"		3:32
6.	"Kitty Doggy"		0:41
7.	"Blue Comb '78"		3:04
8.	"Banner Year"	Kerr	4:13
9.	"Second Season"	music & lyrics: Culp	3:45
10.	"Litmus"		4:05
11.	"Oh, Canada"	M. Ortega, Culp	3:15
12.	"Most Likely to Succeed"	music: Kerr, lyrics: Kerr, Roper	3:57
13.	"Every New Day"		4:13
14.	"The Godzilla Song" (hidden track)		2:03
Total length:			46:52

== Personnel ==
Five Iron Frenzy

- Keith Hoerig – bass
- Micah Ortega – guitar
- Scott Kerr – guitar, backing vocals
- Andrew Verdecchio – drums
- Dennis Culp – trombone, backing vocals, lead vocals on "Second Season"
- Leanor (Jeff the Girl) Ortega – sax
- Reese Roper – lead vocals
- Nathanael (Brad) Dunham – trumpet

Production

- Masaki Liu – engineer, mixing
- Frank Tate – executive producer
- Five Iron Frenzy – mixing
- Ken Lee – mastering

== Charts ==
Album – Billboard (North America)

Year	Chart	Position
1997	US 200	176
