= Until This Shakes Apart =

Studio album by Five Iron Frenzy
- Released: January 15, 2021
- Genre: Punk rock; ska; Christian rock
- Length: 43:15
- Language: English
- Label: Department of Biophysics
- Producer: Scott Kerr

Five Iron Frenzy chronology
Engine of a Million Plots (2013)	Until This Shakes Apart (2021)

Until This Shakes Apart is the seventh studio album by American christian rock ska band, Five Iron Frenzy. Released in 2021, it was met with mostly positive reception.

== Overview ==
=== Background and production ===
After returning from their eight-year hiatus, the band released their sixth album, Engine of a Million Plots, before once again taking a hiatus. However, after a successful Kickstarter campaign, Five Iron Frenzy revealed their seventh studio album; Until This Shakes Apart. Until This Shakes Apart was available on January 14 exclusively for Kickstarter backers, with its public release coming the next day.

Music Videos were released for some singles.

=== Critical reception ===
Professional ratings
Review scores
Source	Rating
CCM Magazine	4/5 stars

Dan Macintosh of CCM gave it a 4 out of 5 stars, stating "Yes, this talented Denver band in part takes on the gun lobby with "Renegades" and various religious right positions on "While Supplies Last", but there are also just as many enjoyable and enjoyably apolitical tracks on this group's strong new release, as well."

Josh Matejka said "The album's lead single, "So We Sing," succeeds as perhaps the record's best example of a pure pop song, extolling the virtues of art as protest while tapping into the defiance that made the band so relatable to young audiences in the 1990s."

"As the coffee soaked into my brain cells, it dawned on me that I don't deserve such a fine platter of ska tunes" reviewed John Bear of Westword.

== Track listing ==
All lyrics written by Reese Roper except where noted otherwise.

No.	Title	Length
1.	"In Through the Out Door"	3:10
2.	"Lonesome for Her Heroes"	3:24
3.	"So We Sing"	3:36
4.	"Bullfight for an Empty Ring"	3:28
5.	"Renegades"	4:50
6.	"Tyrannis"	2:35
7.	"Auld Lanxiety"	3:13
8.	"Homelessly Devoted"	2:35
9.	"One Heart Hypnosis"	3:03
10.	"While Supplies Last"	3:08
11.	"Wildcat"	3:15
12.	"Like Something I missed"	3:28
13.	"Huerfano"	3:10
Total length:		43:15

== See also ==
- Five Iron Frenzy discography
- Reese Roper
