= Sherri Youngward =

- Origin: San Francisco
- Genres: Contemporary Christian, praise and worship
- Instrument: Guitar
- Years active: 1997–present
- Labels: BEC, 5 Minute Walk
- Website: www.sherriyoungward.com

Sherri Youngward is a Christian singer-songwriter from San Francisco, California, U.S. Her career began with singing for Youth With a Mission. Her music is comparable with Sheryl Crow or Sarah McLachlan. HM magazine cites her songs as being "as scriptual as they are emotionally resplendent, as deeply worshipful as they are genuinely artistic."

The song "Where This Love Goes" from Six Inches of Sky appeared in the episode "Tempest" of Smallville and "It's Too Late and It's Too Bad of "Roswell".

== Discography ==
- Faces, Memories, Places (1997, 5 Minute Walk, The Phantom Tollbooth, Youthworker)
- No More Goodbyes (1998, 5 Minute Walk, The Phantom Tollbooth)
- Sons and Daughters (1999, independent)
- Six Inches of Sky (Feb 2002, BEC Recordings, Reviews: Christianity Today, Ninety and Nine.com, The Phantom Tollbooth)
- The Sky Can Still Remember (2003, independent)
- The Words That You Left Me (2004, independent)
- These Things Don't Change (2006, independent)
- Peace (single, 2007, independent)
- Scripture Songs, Volume One (2008, independent)
- She Looks to the Sky (2009, independent)
- Scripture Songs, Volume Two (2012, independent)
- While We Are Alive (2014, independent)
- All the Wonders (2018, independent)
- Even In Valleys (2023, independent)
