= Proof That the Youth Are Revolting =

1999 Live album by Five Iron Frenzy

Live album by Five Iron Frenzy
- Released: November 2, 1999
- Recorded: Various concerts from 1998 to 1999.
- Genre: Christian ska
- Length: 71:38
- Label: 5 Minute Walk
- Producer: Frank Tate

Five Iron Frenzy chronology
Quantity Is Job 1 (1998)	Proof That the Youth Are Revolting (1999)	All the Hype That Money Can Buy (2000)

Professional ratings
Review scores
Source	Rating
AllMusic	link
bandoppler.com	link
Decapolis	link
HM Magazine	link
Jesus Freak Hideout	link
The Phantom Tollbooth	3.5/5 link
Real Magazine	link

Proof That the Youth Are Revolting is Five Iron Frenzy's first live album, released November 2, 1999 by 5 Minute Walk. It was recorded at eleven shows throughout 1998 and 1999, including Cornerstone 1999. The cover art was made by Doug TenNapel.

In Five Iron's typical fashion Proof contains the band's humour. "A New Hope" ends with the song "Kingdom of the Dinosaurs", the hidden track after the end of "Every New Day" features various slip-ups recorded over the tour, and the title itself has a double meaning. The word "Revolting" is used to mean "disgusting", or "starting a revolution". The revolution referred to, however, is one of the heart. According to Keith Hoerig this is "... a personal revolution that each individual partakes in the choices they make and the way they live their lives."

The album contains a number of cover songs and references to other bands. The band fully covers Tom Jones "It's Not Unusual" and "Receive Him" by the Christian metal group Vengeance Rising. The introductory track makes a reference to Stryper's album To Hell with the Devil. "Superpowers" integrates The Cure's "Close to Me" in the lead, and "One Girl Army" begins with a cover of Europe's "The Final Countdown".

While Proof was designed to consist of fan favorites, it also marks the first appearance of "A New Hope." "A New Hope" was written about the Columbine High School massacre, which affected some members of the band on a personal level. The band often practiced at Micah Ortega's house, which was a five-minute walk from the school, and his sister attended there at the time of the shootings.

For those who attended any of the concerts which were recorded to be potentially used as this live album, the band had pieces of paper at their merchandise booth where one could sign up to be registered as a "backup singer." While the final album used cuts from a variety of shows, all the people who filled out their names were mentioned in a large fold-out booklet that went with the album, listed under the title "backup singers." In total about 7,000 names were listed.

== Track listing ==
1. "Introduction" – 0:54
2. "One Girl Army" – 3:38
3. "Oh, Canada" – 3:02
4. "A Flowery Song" – 4:10
5. "Handbook For the Sellout" – 4:05
6. "Receive Him" – 0:20
7. "All That Is Good" – 3:21
8. "Dandelions" – 3:20
9. "Suckerpunch" – 4:04
10. "It's Not Unusual" – 2:12
11. "Anthem" – 3:27
12. "New Hope" – 3:45
  - Ends with the song "Kingdom of the Dinosaurs"
13. "Arnold, Willis & Mr. Drummond" – 2:30
14. "Ugly Day" – 4:39
15. "Where Zero Meets 15" – 4:48
16. "Superpowers" – 3:46
17. "Blue Comb '78" – 4:02
18. "Every New Day" – 4:58

-Hidden Track-

1. "Messups"

== Charts ==
Album - Billboard (North America)

Year	Chart	Position
1999	The Billboard 200	190
