= Rose Blossom Punch =

American rock band

- Origin: Seattle, Washington, U.S.
- Genres: Post-grunge, alternative rock
- Years active: 1995-1999
- Labels: Tooth and Nail, SaraBellum, Jackson Rubio
- Members: Aaron Sprinkle; Terry Coggins; Nick Barber; Paul Mumaw

Rose Blossom Punch was a post-grunge/alternative rock band from Seattle, Washington. It was formed in 1995 by Aaron Sprinkle and Paul Mumaw, with Poor Old Lu bassist Nick Barber and guitarist Terry Coggins.

Two songs, "Sowing in the Sun" (1995) and "See It in Me" (1996), appeared on Tooth and Nail Records compilations, and a demo of "Based on a True Story" in a 1997 SaraBellum Records sampler. An album, Ephemere, was released on July 10, 1997 on SaraBellum. An EP, Sorry to Disappoint You, recorded for Jackson Rubio in 1999, was self-released in December 2000.

== Discography ==
- Ephemere - SaraBellum Records (1997)
- Sorry to Disappoint You - self-released (1999), remastered in 2019, re-released via Bandcamp

=== Compilation appearances ===
- "Sowing in the Sun" on Art Core Vol. I - Tooth and Nail Records (1995)
- "See It in Me" on Art Core Vol. II - Tooth and Nail Records (1996)
- "Based on a True Story (Demo)" on Music for Meals: Take Time to Listen Vol. III - SaraBellum Records (1997)
- "Sleepily" on "Vitaphonic (and other sonic pleasures)" - Sad Puppy Records (1998)
- "Haunted Church" on Five Minute Walk Records Greatest Hits 1995-1999 - Five Minute Walk (1999)

=== Reunions ===
Rose Blossom Punch reunited for a show in Seattle at The Showbox, at a show with Poor Old Lu and The Prayer Chain.
