= Reese Roper =

American singer-songwriter (born 1973)

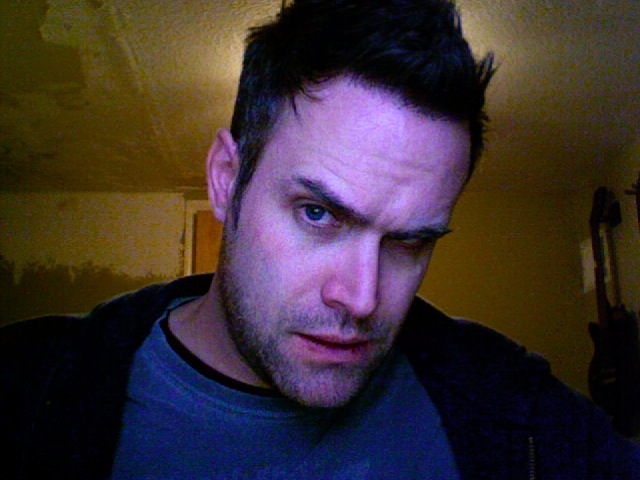

Background information
- Birth name: Michael Reese Roper
- Also known as: M. Reese Roper
- Born: June 30, 1973 (age 51); Steamboat Springs, Colorado, US
- Genres: Christian ska, ska punk, alternative rock
- Labels: Five Minute Walk, Asian Man, Tooth & Nail, Department of Biophysics

Michael Reese Roper (born June 30, 1973) is an American singer-songwriter, best known as lead singer for the Denver, Colorado-based Christian ska punk band Five Iron Frenzy, as well as fronting the rock bands Brave Saint Saturn and Roper.

== Personal information ==
Reese Roper is known for his quirky and satirical sense of humor, but his work is also marked with a deep interest in history, politics, and self-awareness. He has been the primary lyricist and vocalist, as well as a key musical contributor, in several bands. He is a graduate of East High School. He attended the University of Colorado at Denver throughout his time in FIF and graduated with a degree in Biology/ Pre-Medicine. He is a licensed pastor from the Alliance for Renewal Churches, Mansfield, Ohio, and is also a co-founder of the Scum of the Earth Church in Denver, Colorado.

In 2021, he was a Registered Nurse, living in Staunton, VA.

== Musical career ==
Before his ska and rock projects, Reese Roper was in the short-lived, Colorado-based, industrial metal group Exhumator. Members of that band joined with a larger cast of musicians to form the ska ensemble Five Iron Frenzy, who in 1996 signed with 5 Minute Walk recording studio. During this time Roper became known for his "vocal finesse" and, the ability to write lyrics with both a "tradition of ridiculousness" and a reverence for serious issues. The band was together until November 22, 2003, which is when they played their final show at the sold out Fillmore Auditorium in Denver, Colorado. Roper was both the lead vocalist and primary lyricist.

The concept of Brave Saint Saturn (or BS2) began in 1995, but it was only during the final years of Five Iron Frenzy that Reese formalized the band with FIF bandmates Dennis Culp and Keith Hoerig. BS2 is primarily a studio project and has been described by Roper as an outlet for songs that didn't fit Five Iron Frenzy's musical style. The band and some fans put forth a new term, "astro-rock", to describe the music of Brave Saint Saturn, which is fundamentally rooted in synthesizer-bathed post-punk and haunting ballads. The band also describes themselves as being the "supersonic-philharmonic", in reference to their blending of rock music, classical instruments, synthesizers, and beat loops. The third album of the "BS2 trilogy," Anti-Meridian, was released on September 15, 2008. During an interview on October 15, Roper indicated that this may not be the last album from BS2.

After Five Iron Frenzy broke up, he was initially slated to lend his vocals and synthesizer skills to Guerilla Rodeo, which had been engineered by Roper, along with another FIF alum, Sonnie Johnston; Ethan Luck from the OC Supertones; and John Warne and Josh Abbott, both from the band Ace Troubleshooter. However, after recording three songs and releasing a self-titled EP with the band, he decided not to join for organizational reasons. Roper instead, at the behest of his former label, formed another band of his own. He eventually settled on naming the band "Roper" in an attempt to gain favor with the band's record label, who encouraged the moniker in an attempt to lessen advertising costs. The band Roper released their first album, Brace Yourself for the Mediocre in late 2004, with a team of studio musicians working with Roper to create a high energy blend of post-pop-punk closer in sound to Five Iron Frenzy than Brave Saint Saturn. After putting together a band consisting of Nick White (Divot) on drums, Jonathan Byrnside- lead guitar, Stephen Till(Nathan and Stephen, Black Black Ocean, Hearts of Palm)- Rhythm guitar, and his brother Johnathan Till- on bass; the band toured for two years before going into an indefinite hiatus.

Reese Roper has also published various poetry volumes in small circulation and participated in two poetry tours- one initiated by Skeleton Key Publishing, and an earlier one initiated by Mike Lewis of the band Puller. Copies of his volume More Than Paper Thin sold during the tour included a home-burned CD of spoken poetry and cover songs, entitled Where Dreams May Spark and Flicker.

Additionally, Roper has been featured in three tracks by Showbread; their 2004 release No Sir, Nihilism Is Not Practical on the songs "Matthias Replaces Judas" and "Stabbing Art to Death", and their 2008 release Nervosa on the song "The Beginning". He has also worked with the band Trash Oven, mastering their EP.

== Politics ==
Roper is known not only for his faith-based lyrics, but for a social justice approach to Christianity based on his Biblical perspective on Jesus Christ and his apostles. Although his personal blog promotes such notable Evangelical left figures as Jimmy Carter and Tony Campolo as "people I love and support", Roper has never publicly affirmed a political viewpoint, but has said in a HM Magazine editorial that Christians need to abandon blind nationalism and pursue Christ instead. In a 2014 blog post explaining the lyrics behind the Five Iron Frenzy song "Zen and the Art of Xenophobia" from their 2013 album Engine of a Million Plots, Roper elaborated on the subject:

I really believe that the Biblical model is to let Christianity influence our politics, not to be the politics. There are few things more embarrassing for me, than the endless parade of jack-wads currently using the name of Jesus Christ for political gain in this country. Historically, the name of Christ has been used since the first century to justify countless atrocities. You would think that in a country that has barely just emerged from slavery and institutionalized racism – we would approach things with a bit more caution. We still don't get it. Stop using the name of Jesus in your politics. Our political machine is driven by fear and greed, and the promise of those two things. Neither one of them being an attribute espoused by anyone in the New Testament. Especially Jesus. Our nation is split in two, with one side parading xenophobic madness as a means of political gain. This is not how Christ taught us to behave.

Additionally, the historical abuses of the United States of America (particularly against Native Americans) and the Christian Church appear frequently in Roper's lyrical work, as well as self-searching for topics of personal depravity. He has also composed many songs that present scathing critiques of unbridled capitalism. The BS2 album Anti-Meridian uses a sound clip of Pat Robertson from The 700 Club, in which Robertson says that the United States should assassinate Hugo Chavez, to show a counterpoint to what he believes most Christians actually believe, but isn't seen in the media, about war and violence.

Regarding Roper's stance on LGBTQ+ rights: when Trey Pearson, another Christian musician, came out as gay, his band, Everyday Sunday, was kicked from the lineup of the Christian Music Festival Joshua Fest in 2016, due to nearly three-quarters of the stage crew threatening to drop out should his band be allowed to perform; Pearson did, however, decide to attend the festival as a solo audience member in spite of this. Roper was not happy about the decision made by the organizers of Joshua Fest, nor were the rest of Five Iron Frenzy, and they talked about potentially dropping out in protest. Instead, when they heard that Pearson would be attending as an audience member, they reached out, and asked if he'd like to join them to sing their final number, "Every New Day." Pearson eagerly accepted, and despite some uncomfortable stares from a handful of people backstage, he performed the track with Five Iron Frenzy. Regarding the decision by the Joshua Fest stage crew to drop Everyday Sunday, Roper said:

We had all talked as a band about just dropping off of [the festival], just to make a statement, like if you’re not gonna let him play, then we’re not gonna play. We don’t like to deal with that kind of intolerance. Especially to me, if you’re espousing being full of the love of Christ, that’s just not how you do it. I think it [bringing Pearson on stage] was very positive. I see on our Facebook page just a lot of people saying, ‘Thanks for doing that.’ I really wish we could do more. I feel like the church is just hemorrhaging over this issue, and it bothers me so much to know that what we choose to do with the love of Christ is to ostracize people. If you talk to the guys in my mind, I think there’s a gamut of feelings about homosexuality and whether or not it’s sinful, or what a sin is.”

== Discography ==
With Five Iron Frenzy
See Five Iron Frenzy discography for complete listing

- Upbeats and Beatdowns (1996) – lead vocals
- Our Newest Album Ever (1997) – lead vocals
- All the Hype That Money Can Buy (2000) – lead vocals
- Five Iron Frenzy 2: Electric Boogaloo (2001) – lead vocals
- The End Is Near (2003) – lead vocals
- Engine of a Million Plots (2013) – lead vocals
- Until This Shakes Apart (2021) – lead vocals

With Brave Saint Saturn

- So Far from Home (2000) – lead vocals
- The Light of Things Hoped For... (2003) – lead vocals, piano, keyboards, guitar
- Anti-Meridian (2008) – vocals, guitar, keyboards, programming

With Guerilla Rodeo

- Guerilla Rodeo EP (2004) – vocals

With Roper

- Brace Yourself for the Mediocre (2004) – vocals, keyboard

Guest appearances

- Showbread – No Sir, Nihilism Is Not Practical (2004) – vocals on "Stabbing Art to Death" and "Matthias Replaces Judas"
- Showbread – Nervosa (2008) – vocals on "The Beginning"
- The Insyderz – The Sinner's Songbook (2012) – vocals on "Sinner's Songbook"
- The Light Fantastic – Passionate Hope Vol. 3: Songs of Worship (2012) – vocals on "Fix You (Coldplay Cover)"
- October Light – Till The End (2019) – vocals on "Reset"

== Filmmaking ==
Films The Rise and Fall of Five Iron Frenzy (2010)

Short Films

- Elfie Time (1997)
- Fear and Loathing in Denver (1998)
- The Wayne Chronicles (1999)
- Welcome to My Pain (1999)
- When Keith Almost Died (2000)
- Rolling Papers (2000)
- A Long Road in Germany (2000)
- Tea Party (2001)
- The Flip Flipperson Debacle (2001)

Videos

- Farsighted (2002)
