= Roper (band) =

American Christian pop-punk band

- Origin: Denver, Colorado, US
- Genres: Pop punk
- Years active: 2004–2005
- Label: Five Minute Walk
- Past members: Reese Roper; Jonathan Byrnside; Matt "Emo" Emmett; Johnathan Till; Nick White; Stephen Till

Roper was a Christian pop-punk band formed in Denver, Colorado. The band consisted of Reese Roper (lead singer of Five Iron Frenzy) on lead vocals, Jonathan Byrnside on lead guitar, Johnathan Till on bass, Matt Emmett on rhythm guitar, and Nick White on drums.

== Background ==
Guerilla Rodeo was a short-lived project founded by Reese Roper, meant to follow his prior band Five Iron Frenzy. In addition to vocalist Reese Roper, the band was formed by fellow Five Iron member Sonnie Johnston (guitar), Ethan Luck (guitar), John Warne (bass, background vocals), and Josh Abbott (drums). The project yielded only a three-track EP, Ride, Rope and Destroy, released in 2004. It has been confirmed by both Ethan Luck and Reese Roper that there never was a fourth, unreleased song recorded for the EP. Reese Roper often compared the sound of the band to Letters to Cleo. Their name was a play on the Rage Against the Machine single "Guerrilla Radio".

When the Guerilla Rodeo project came to an end, Reese reformed the band under his own name, Roper. Roper's full-length album, Brace Yourself for the Mediocre, was produced before the band was officially together and released on Five Minute Walk Records. All songs on the album with the exception of "Day of Pigs" and "You're Still The One" were written by Reese Roper, Masaki Liu, and Ethan Luck. Because of the incomplete state of the band at the time of the album's release, the only official member appearing on the CD is Reese Roper. As a result, the album features many additional musicians such as Frank Lenz (drums), Elijah Thomson (bass), Phil Bennett (organ), Bob Schiveley (guitar), Masaki Liu (guitar), Jason White (additional drums), Ethan Luck (guitar), and many additional vocalists. Some of the songs on the album were originally written for Guerilla Rodeo. One of the online forums spawned by this group is the Roper Board in which many fans of both Roper and Reese's previous band Five Iron Frenzy congregate.

Roper issued a statement regarding the status of the band in 2006:

What happened to Roper? Is it dead? - Yes. Roper was a project put together by 5minutewalk records. We had a falling out with them, and are too lazy to start over again. Everyone has real jobs now, and although we miss seeing you all, we are just going to let it die. Unless you are a record company executive that wants to give us an enormous signing bonus and not make us tour.

In 2009 Reese Roper told HM that the probability of making another album was "somewhere around 3%." The Roper project sold close to 30,000 albums in total, about the same as Brave Saint Saturn and other Five Iron related side projects. He also stated that, in retrospect, the project was "doomed from the beginning," but that musically it was the highlight of his career.

== Members ==
- Reese Roper – vocals and synthesizer
- Jonathan Byrnside – guitar
- Matt "Emo" Emmett – guitar
- Johnathan Till – bass guitar
- Nick White – drums
- Stephen Till – guitar

== Discography ==
Year	Album	Billboard Charts	Position	Reviews
2004	Brace Yourself for the Mediocre	Top Heatseekers	46	
2004	Brace Yourself for the Mediocre	Top Christian Albums	27	
