= Brave Saint Saturn =

American Christian rock band

- Origin: Denver, Colorado
- Genres: Astro-rock, Christian rock, progressive rock
- Years active: 1999–present
- Labels: 5 Minute Walk, Tooth & Nail, Department of Biophysics
- Members: Reese Roper; Keith Hoerig; Dennis Culp; Andrew Verdecchio

Brave Saint Saturn (stylized as braveSaintSaturn, brave saint saturn or BS2) is a Christian rock band formed in Denver, Colorado in 1999. The band is a side-project of members of Five Iron Frenzy started by Reese Roper. The band calls their music style "astro-rock", although Roper has stated that this "doesn't mean anything". The trilogy of albums are meant to artfully represent early life, adversity, and death.

== Background ==
Before the band was signed, they were called Astronaut. As a result, "Astronaut Versions" of several early Brave Saint Saturn songs exist. The "Astronaut Version" of "Two-Twenty-Nine" is available on the compilation Manna 2 Go (fifty280 records). An otherwise unreleased Astronaut song, "Albatross," is also available on Green Manna (fifty280 records)

Brave Saint Saturn often uses the vastness of space as a metaphor for loneliness and isolation. With this in mind, the band used NASA recordings and electronic samples on their first two albums. One of the biggest influences on the band's sound was the Electric Light Orchestra album Time. Roper has said that because of this band he has tried to include more strings and orchestral sounds into the group's music.

Some reviewers consider Brave Saint Saturn as a generally more serious band than the often light-hearted Five Iron Frenzy. As the former leader of Five Iron Frenzy, Roper often found the band too straightforwardly fun for expressing feelings of loneliness and abandonment. BS2 is the platform for the more depressed and sad lyrics which Roper has written. When speaking of the band, Roper states that, "I've tried to show the redemption and peace of God through tragic things. I think overall the lyrics are about … hope."

The third of the Saturn 5 Trilogy, Anti-Meridian, was released on September 15, 2008. The physical album is only available through the band's website store, but digital copies were made available at various online stores for digital distribution.

"The future of Brave Saint Saturn kind of hinges on how well this record does... I think that all of us would rather start new projects if this one is done for."

— Reese Roper on the bands' future in 2009.

Roper has stated that the band originally planned to make a story arc that would go across three albums, but the band is in talks to create more music in the future beyond their first three albums. There are plans for an album of b-sides, rarities, and redone songs titled Add-Infinitum.

== Saturn 5 Trilogy ==
Brave Saint Saturn published their first three albums as the Saturn 5 Trilogy.

Saturn 5 Trilogy tells the story of a fictional NASA Saturn 5 Mission, where the crew of the spacecraft Gloria is sent to map the rings of Saturn. While in orbit around Saturn's moon, Titan, the Gloria suffers a crippling disaster that leaves the craft stranded in geosynchronous orbit on the dark side of the moon. The crew is cut off from radio contact with Earth and the light of the sun, and both the crew and their families fear they are lost forever.

The final album of the trilogy, Anti-Meridian, chronicles the return of the crew of the U.S.S. Gloria in an escape pod called the Starling. Lieutenant Hoerig saves the mission at the cost of his own life. The rest of the crew returns to Earth in one of the Starling's escape pods. Several of the songs deal with the crew's thoughts and remembrances in the aftermath of their safe return.

Saturn 5 Trilogy uses the loss and subsequent rescue of the crew metaphorically touching on themes of death, resurrection, redemption, and self-sacrifice drawn from secular, mythological, and Christian sources.

== Members ==
- Reese Roper – vocals, guitar
- Keith Hoerig – bass guitar
- Andrew Verdecchio (2003–present) – drums
- Dennis Culp – background vocals, bass guitar, guitar

== Discography ==
Year	Title	Record label
2000	So Far from Home	5 Minute Walk
2003	The Light of Things Hoped For	Tooth & Nail
2008	Anti-Meridian	Department of Biophysics
