= Ska Against Racism Tour =

1998 concert tour by Mike Park

The Ska Against Racism Tour of 1998 was a one time musical tour in the United States organized by Mike Park, a Korean American musician. The audience was mainly young white male hardcore ska devotees. Ska is a music genre that originated in Jamaica and later became the precursor to rocksteady and reggae. This genre of music promoted racial tolerance through a variety of multicultural artists and bands. The purpose of this tour was to overcome racial barriers in a nonviolent and peaceful manner.

== History ==
Ronald Reagan’s presidency in the 1980s played a key role in the racial issues of this time. His presidential campaigns did not support the Civil Rights movements of previous presidents. Although improvements had been made throughout the 1970s, racial problems and discrimination were still major issues facing minority groups. American Indians, African Americans, Hispanics and Latinos, and Japanese Americans all continued to battle prejudice and discrimination.

Ska music originated in the 1950s in Jamaica. During the 1980s, ska music became popular in England based on the fact that there was mutual respect between white and black musicians.

The 1998 tour was organized by Mike Park, a musician of color himself. Park organized this tour hoping it would teach the young generation of that era about racism. The 28-year-old singer had also bagged the groups Anti Racist Action and Artists for a Hate-Free America, as well as the Museum of Tolerance in Los Angeles, all of which have helped to promote the tour. Mike Park is a strong advocate of racial unity. Through his music, he addresses important racial issues as well as social and political issues that he believes are important. To continue the fight for peace and equality, Park founded the Plea For Peace Foundation (www.pleaforpeace.net) in 1999. It is a 501C3 non-profit organization that facilitates benefit tours, CD's, and publications backed by a strong network of bands, labels, charities, and supporters. Plea For Peace Foundation's message is "To promote the ideas of peace through the power of music".

== Musical style ==
Ska is the sole music genre that's incorporated into the Ska Against Racism Tour. Ska Against Racism is an eight-band throw down of multiple, mix-and-mash styles—including punk, rap, rock and r&b-- all anchored by ska. Each and every one of the bands that participated in the 1998 tour play music that spans one or more sub-genres of ska music. For instance, ska punk is a fusion music genre that combines ska music with punk rock music.

Some of the most popular Ska bands include: The Specials (since 1977), The (English) Beat (since 1978), The Toasters (since 1981) The Mighty Mighty Bosstones (since 1983), No Doubt (since 1986), Skankin' Pickle (1989-1996), Mustard Plug (since 1991), Reel Big Fish (since 1992), Less Than Jake (since 1992), and Five Iron Frenzy (since 1995).

Five of these popular Ska bands played in the 1998 Ska Against Racism Tour.

== Impact of the Tour ==
Mike Park stated, "what we're hoping with this tour is to maybe educate about the history of ska, but also hit an age group that's really impressionable. I know a lot of these kids are just here to see the music, but if we can get a small percentage to really get involved, become proactive, and volunteer their time with youth centers and demonstrate against Klans in their area--whatever. Just to become more educated." Chuck Wren, the radio and street promotion for the tour, said he didn't think it would change the world but that on balance it was a good thing: "I think part of the reason for the tour is to bring some awareness and to hand out literature from the different organizations and to raise money as well."

According to the Blue Meanies, few of the bands playing in the tour were committed to the message. Park stated that, "[The tour had] very little emphasis on racism...we say periodically in the set 'Racism sucks,' but that's it." Park was disappointed in the outcome of the tour but he confessed that there was no time to get things properly organized. Despite the disappointment, the tour donated $23,000 to Anti-Racism Action and the National Council of Churches' Burned Churches Fund. It included 100 percent of the profits from official Ska Against Racism merchandise—about $7,000—and the $15,000 that was left over after the bands took their cut.

== Lineup ==
The tour line-up consisted of Less Than Jake, Mustard Plug, The Toasters, Five Iron Frenzy, MU330, Blue Meanies, Mike Park, Reel Big Fish, and Kemuri.

== Tour dates ==
Listed below are the tour dates and locations of the Ska Against Racism Tour of 1998. Large metropolitan areas are among the nation’s most segregated regions, and while none are meaningfully integrated, some are divided far more along racial lines than others.

The racial divide in Cincinnati is one of the greatest in the country; While 10.3% of white area residents live in poverty, more than 30% of Hispanic residents and more than 33% of black residents live below the poverty line, both among the highest rates in the country. Houston, Texas has a 60.6 white-black dissimilarity score, Washington D.C. has a 61.0 white-black dissimilarity score, Pittsburgh, Pa. has a 63.1 white-black dissimilarity score, New Orleans has a 63.3 white-black dissimilarity score, Chicago has a 75.2 white-black dissimilarity score, New York City, N.Y. has a 76.9 white-black dissimilarity score, and Milwaukee, Wisc. has the highest at 79.6 white-black dissimilarity. Racial inequality in Milwaukee County is divided along racial and political lines, and the city is the most segregated in America.

United States (1998)
Date	Location	Venue	
March 26*	Auburn, WA	Green River Community College	*1st date of the tour sans Mustard Plug (missed flight)
April 1	Palo Alto	The Edge	
April 2	Ventura	Ventura Theatre	
April 3	Las Vegas	Huntridge Theatre	
April 4	Tempe	ASU	
April 5	Irvine	Oak Canyon Ranch	
April 7	Austin	Voodoo Lounge	
April 8	Dallas	Dallas Music Complex	
April 9	Houston	Fitzgerald's	
April 10	New Orleans	Tipitina's Warehouse	
April 11	Jacksonville	Skateworld	
April 12	St. Petersburg	Janus Landing	
April 13	Orlando	The Club @ Firestone	
April 14	Sunrise	Sunrise Musical	
April 15	Atlanta	Masquerade	
April 16	Winston-Salem	Ziggy's	
April 17	Norfolk	The Boathouse	
April 18	Harrisonburg	Godwin Hall	
April 19	Philadelphia	The Trocadero	
April 21	Washington, D.C.	9:30 Club	
April 23	New York City	Roseland Ballroom	
April 24	Worcester	The Palladium	
April 25	Hartford	Webster Theater	
April 26	Montclair	Montclair State	
April 28	Pittsburgh	Metropol	
April 29	Cincinnati	Bogart's	
April 30	Roseville	The Palladium	
May 1	Chicago	Riviera Theater	
May 2	Milwaukee	The Rave Ballroom	
May 3	Ames	Iowa State University	
May 5	St. Louis	Galaxy	
May 6	Kansas City	The Beaumont	
May 8	Denver	Mammoth Event Center	
May 9	Casper	Casper Events Center	
May 10	Helena, MT	Helena Civic Center	
