= Keith Hoerig =

American bassist

- Genres: Third-wave ska, folk, Christian ska, ska punk
- Instrument: Bass guitar
- Years active: 1995–present

Keith Hoerig is the former bass guitarist for Five Iron Frenzy and Brave Saint Saturn. Following Five Iron Frenzy's breakup in 2003, he assisted former bandmate Reese Roper with booking his new band, Roper.

He lives in Denver, Colorado. He and his wife Eryn perform in a number of projects including alt-country band The Hollyfelds, vintage pop band The Jekylls, and country duets project The Kingbyrds.

He chose not to participate in Five Iron Frenzy's 2011 reunion and was replaced on bass guitar by the band's former guitarist Scott Kerr, who had initially left the band in 1998.
