= Five Iron Frenzy =

Christian ska and punk band

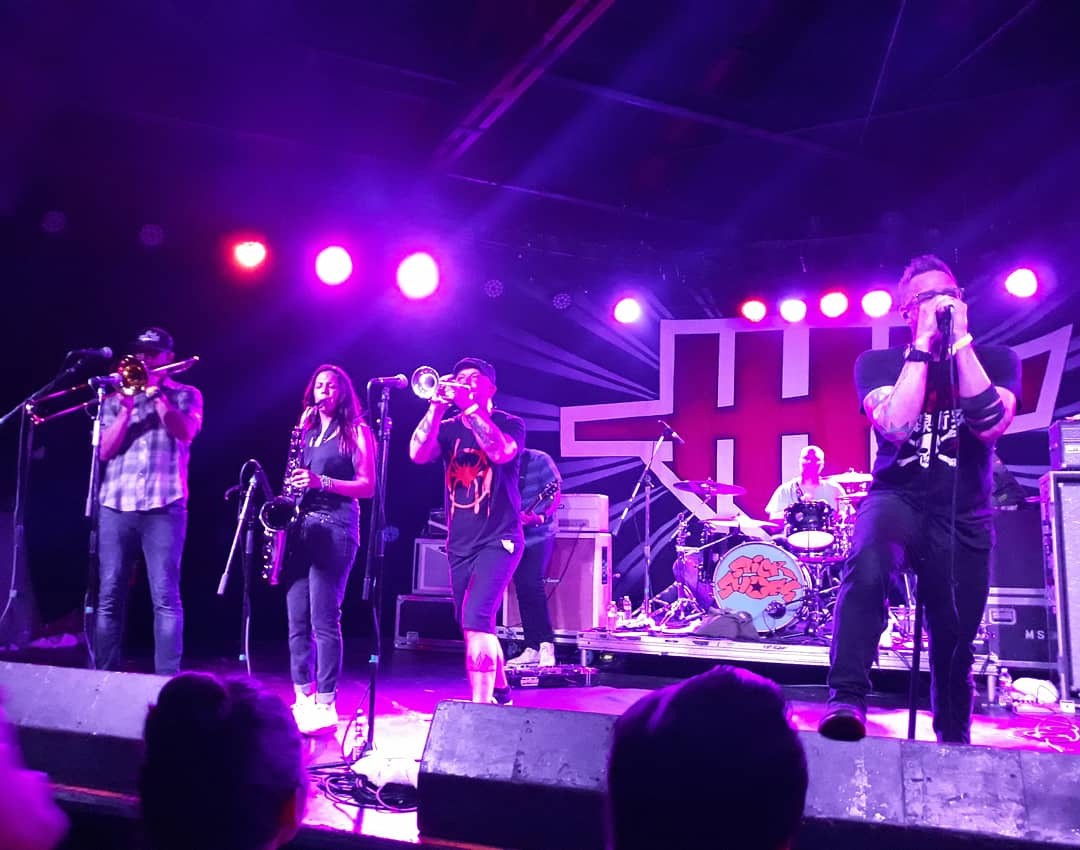
- Five Iron Frenzy in July 2019

Background information
- Origin: Denver, Colorado, U.S.
- Genres: Christian ska; ska punk; christian punk; alternative rock; pop punk
- Years active: 1995–2003, 2011–present
- Labels: SaraBellum; 5 Minute Walk; WEA; ForeFront; Department of Biophysics
- Members: Reese Roper; Micah Ortega; Dennis Culp; Andrew Verdecchio; Leanor "Jeff the Girl" Ortega Till; Nathanael "Brad" Dunham; Sonnie Johnston; Scott Kerr
- Past members: Keith Hoerig
- Website: fiveironfrenzy.com

Five Iron Frenzy is an American band which formed in Denver, Colorado, in 1995. Best known for playing ska punk music characterized by an offbeat sense of humor and prominent Christian themes, Five Iron Frenzy was one of the pioneering figures of the Christian ska movement which emerged with ska's mainstream revival in the 1990s. Since 2000, the band's music has shifted away from straight ska to include and embrace stronger alternative rock and pop punk influences, though it continues to create ska music and feature Christian lyrical themes despite several members' changes in religious beliefs.

Five Iron Frenzy experienced their greatest commercial success during the late 1990s as part of the American ska revival, touring prolifically within both Christian and secular markets, where the band gained a cult following for their energetic live shows typified by humorous stage antics which often drew attention to various social causes and charities. By the early 2000s, Five Iron Frenzy had independently sold a total of almost one million albums, though a number of factors eventually contributed to their break-up in 2003. After an eight-year hiatus, the band reunited in 2011 to resume intermittent touring, launching a coincident Kickstarter campaign to finance a new album which raised a then record-breaking $207,980. The resultant album, Engine of a Million Plots, was released in November 2013.

Five Iron Frenzy is often noted for the broad tonal range of their lyricism, covering subject matter both spiritual and secular in manners both serious and satirical. Many of the band's songs are firmly rooted in Social Gospel convictions, often exploring themes of Christian hypocrisy and fundamentalism, manifest destiny and the injustices done to Native Americans, and faith-based criticisms of capitalism, consumerism, nationalism, xenophobia, racism, homophobia, and even the Christian music industry, as well as more traditional and uplifting songs of praise and worship. The band is also known for their comic songs which rely on droll self-deprecating and self-referential humor, absurdist non-sequiturs and frequent references to pop culture and geek culture.

== History ==
=== Formation and early years (1993–1996) ===
The origins of Five Iron Frenzy were with the band Exhumator, a Denver-based Christian industrial thrash metal project which featured future Five Iron Frenzy vocalist Reese Roper, guitarists Micah Ortega and Scott Kerr, bassist Keith Hoerig and drummer Andrew Verdecchio. As punk rock and ska had begun making a popular resurgence in alternative music in the early 1990s, the members of Exhumator soon began shifting their attention away from metal, and, largely influenced by bands such as Skankin' Pickle and NOFX, formed Five Iron Frenzy as a ska/pop punk side project in early 1995. The name "Five Iron Frenzy" was a band in-joke, conceived during an occasion when the members' "paranoid" roommate brandished a golf club in self-defense out of an unfounded fear of being mugged.

Five Iron Frenzy's first show, hosted at a church coffeehouse in April 1995, was as an opening act for Exhumator. According to Reese Roper's recollection of the event, the audience responded to Five Iron Frenzy's music better than they had ever responded to Exhumator's, and realizing that everyone had more fun playing ska punk than metal, made the decision to dissolve Exhumator in favor of Five Iron Frenzy that very night. Over their next few shows, the band gradually recruited a horn section consisting of trumpeter Nathaniel "Brad" Dunham, trombonist Dennis Culp and Micah Ortega's cousin, saxophonist Leanor Ortega.

Almost instantly, Five Iron Frenzy became a prominent presence in the Denver music scene. The band opened for Tooth & Nail Records artists MxPx for their third show and played over sixty shows during their first eight months, soon becoming a staple of every major ska show in the Denver area, opening for such nationally successful touring bands as The Mighty Mighty Bosstones and Less Than Jake. Although Five Iron Frenzy's initial intent was to stay local and help develop their own scene, in June 1995, the band traveled to the Cornerstone Festival in Bushnell, Illinois, to play an impromptu set before several prominent Christian alternative bands and record labels, including Ghoti Hook, Crashdog and Alex Parker of Flying Tart Records. The band has since partially attributed their early success to this stunt, as they would return to Cornerstone the following year sponsored by a record label.

As their local popularity grew, Five Iron Frenzy solidified a "mission statement" that they would play half regular venues and half Christian venues to reach both secular and Christian audiences. By the summer of 1996, the band had released their first recorded material—a 7" single entitled It's Funny, But Not Very Creative, which featured two original songs and a tongue-in-cheek punk rock cover of Amy Grant's 1985 hit "Everywhere I Go"—and were entertaining offers from several major Christian record labels including Tooth & Nail, Alarma and Brainstorm Artists International before ultimately signing with 5 Minute Walk Records. In September, Five Iron Frenzy recorded their first studio album Upbeats and Beatdowns, which was released later that November.

=== Upbeats and Beatdowns, national recognition and Our Newest Album Ever! (1997–1999) ===
In April 1997, Upbeats and Beatdowns was given a national re-release on 5 Minute Walk's newly founded sub-label SaraBellum Records, which was in distribution partnership with the Warner Music Group. Released during the peak of ska punk's mainstream reign, Upbeats and Beatdowns proved to be a modest but significant success for the band, selling over 50,000 units in 1997 and peaking at number 39 on Billboard's Top Contemporary Christian chart, while a music video for the single "A Flowery Song" earned a Dove Award nomination for Short Form Music Video of the Year. Five Iron Frenzy retrospectively described their initial success as completely unexpected, though the band ultimately credited their sudden surge of independent fame less to the quality of their music and more to the effect of ska punk's mainstream popularity and the "niche market" of Christian music. In a 1997 interview, primary composer Scott Kerr lamented "[t]he unfortunate reality is that good songs and good live performances have far less to do with our so-called success than our being a part of the 'flavor-of-the-month'."

"It's one thing to say, now that I'm 39, maybe we could still be doing this, or we could have had one hit song that made the radio. But I would much rather tell my kids that we helped pay for two orphanages, or that every tour we did, we collected something—socks or coats—for homeless people."

— Reese Roper, on the band's decision to remain independent.

Following the success of Upbeats and Beatdowns, the members of Five Iron Frenzy were able to quit their day jobs and devote themselves to the band full-time. The group spent the remainder of 1997 touring nationally, playing over 150 shows across the country. Many of these shows and tours were held in promotion of various social causes and charities; during the band's "Rock Your Socks Off Tour" in October 1997, fans were asked to bring clean socks for donation. Many of these charitable endeavors were supported or organized by 5 Minute Walk. In a 2012 interview, Reese Roper praised the label for "[putting] their money where their mouth was. For being underground and for what they were, they really did want to help people". This would ultimately influence the band's decision to remain independent under 5 Minute Walk, despite having the opportunities to sign with larger labels.

Five Iron Frenzy's second album, Our Newest Album Ever!, was released in November 1997 and experienced a similarly modest commercial success like that of Upbeats and Beatdowns, debuting at number 8 on Billboard's Top Heatseekers and peaking at number 176 on the Billboard 200. In wake of the album's release, Five Iron Frenzy participated in two high-profile national tours. In Spring 1998, the band performed on the Ska Against Racism tour, a ska punk tour orchestrated by Mike Park of Asian Man Records, which raised money for anti-racism organizations. As the only openly Christian band on the tour, Ska Against Racism helped further strengthen Five Iron Frenzy's reputation among secular audiences: Reese Roper recalled the band making many new fans from attendees who were initially worried the band would attempt to "shove religion down their throats", as well as forming lasting friendships with most of the secular bands on the roster. Following the end of Ska Against Racism, Five Iron Frenzy quickly wrote and recorded a new album in preparation for their next national tour, resulting in the 40-minute 17-track "EP" Quantity Is Job 1, which was reportedly written in only two weeks.

In late 1998, Five Iron Frenzy took part in SkaMania, a national tour which paired them with the other two most commercially successful bands in the Christian ska market, The O.C. Supertones and The Insyderz. The tour was a resounding success within the Christian alternative scene, drawing around 3,000 attendees a night and helping boost sales of Quantity Is Job 1 into the top fifteen of both Billboard's Contemporary Christian chart and Top Heatseekers. At this time, Scott Kerr announced his decision to depart Five Iron Frenzy following the end of the SkaMania tour. Kerr cited several reasons for choosing to leave the band, including wanting to spend more time with his wife and desiring to explore other musical projects away from ska and punk, though would later explain that his primary reason was having gradually lost his faith in Christianity. Upon leaving Five Iron Frenzy, Kerr would form the Denver-based power pop band Yellow Second, in which he served as lead singer, songwriter and guitarist. Sonnie Johnson, former guitarist for California ska punk band Jeffries Fan Club, replaced Kerr in Five Iron Frenzy's line-up.

Five Iron Frenzy released their first live album, Proof That the Youth Are Revolting, in November 1999, containing recordings of several live shows across 1998 and 1999, including the 1999 Cornerstone Festival. During the recording of these shows, Five Iron Frenzy offered forms at their merchandise booth where fans could provide their names and therefore be credited as "backup singers" for the album. Over 7,000 names were eventually printed in the CD's liner notes. Proof That the Youth Are Revolting cracked the top ten of both Billboard's Top Heatseekers and Contemporary Christian charts, peaking at number 190 on the Billboard 200.

=== All the Hype That Money Can Buy and Five Iron Frenzy 2: Electric Boogaloo (2000–2001) ===
In April 2000, Five Iron Frenzy released their third album All the Hype That Money Can Buy. By this time, public and media interest in ska music had waned significantly, and, motivated by the desire to not "put out the same record twice", All the Hype That Money Can Buy found Five Iron Frenzy diversifying their sound far beyond ska, incorporating stronger rock and punk influences as well as elements of Latin music, salsa, calypso and reggae. The album included the song "A New Hope", which was written about the 1999 Columbine High School massacre in Columbine, Colorado, where guitarist Micah Ortega's sister was a student at the time of the shooting. Although the mainstream decline of ska music worked against the album in promotion and airplay, All the Hype That Money Can Buy became Five Iron Frenzy's then highest-charting release, reaching number 6 on the Contemporary Christian charts and number 146 on the Billboard 200.

Five Iron Frenzy toured internationally throughout the turn of the century, expanding their touring reach across both the European and Oceanic continents. In June 2000, Five Iron Frenzy played five shows in South Africa, one of which was a free concert held in an auditorium in the township of Phuthaditjhaba, where the group spent the majority of the day playing with children from the local orphanage. The members of Five Iron Frenzy noted that nobody in the township had heard of their band and many had never seen an American or even heard rock music before. In a 2010 interview, Reese Roper stated that everybody cared less about the music "as they just did that we were there". He elaborated on the personal impact of this show, noting that "all of the trappings, all of the barriers I had experienced from being in a band and trying to share the love of Jesus Christ had disappeared", describing it as "the best day that I ever remember being in Five Iron Frenzy".

By 2001, Five Iron Frenzy were playing upwards of 250 shows a year. Several members, some of whom had just recently married, began to feel burnt out by the band's full-time touring commitments. This burnout was exacerbated by several personal tragedies, including the deaths of Leanor Ortega's brother in October 2000 and Andrew Verdecchio's father in August 2001, over which both Ortega and Verdecchio spent time questioning their religious faith. Nevertheless, Five Iron Frenzy was scheduled to headline the 49-date "Electric Youth Tour" in late 2001, supported by Christian artists Relient K, John Reuben and Ace Troubleshooter. Three days before the tour was set to begin in Fishkill, New York, the September 11 terrorist attacks were carried out in nearby Manhattan. Although the band initially questioned whether it was appropriate to tour in wake of the events, they chose to proceed with the tour as planned, a decision which was warmly received by audiences, whose numbers averaged around 1,200 a night. As on previous tours, Five Iron Frenzy again asked fans to bring clean socks for donation to local shelters, though on this occasion also used said socks for audience participation games involving sock puppets, as the band felt a need to bring people together under light-hearted circumstances.

Five Iron Frenzy's fourth album, Five Iron Frenzy 2: Electric Boogaloo, was released in November 2001 and marked a drastic stylistic shift from the band's previous albums. Though the group retained their prominent horn section, Electric Boogaloo featured none of the ska influences which dominated the band's first three albums, instead focusing exclusively on alternative rock and pop punk. Bassist Keith Hoerig described the album as simply "a rock record with horns", likening the band's use of brass to that of such horn-driven rock bands as Chicago. Electric Boogaloo also marked the end of Five Iron Frenzy's record contract with 5 Minute Walk; though the band again considered the possibility of signing to a major label—according to Micah Ortega, an A&R executive from Atlantic Records visited Five Iron Frenzy during the recording of Electric Boogaloo—they ultimately chose to remain with 5 Minute Walk, citing the label's commitment to ministry. At the time of Electric Boogaloo's release, Five Iron Frenzy's collective discography had sold over 500,000 units worldwide. However, the album proved to be a minor disappointment, debuting at number 19 on the Contemporary Christian charts and failing to chart at all on the Billboard 200, their first album to not do so since their debut.

=== Breakup and The End is Near (2002–2003) ===
Five Iron Frenzy significantly scaled back their touring for most of 2002, headlining only one tour among several festival appearances and fifteen dates on the Vans Warped Tour. As had been band tradition, Five Iron Frenzy met with their pastor for a spiritual retreat at the end of the year to discuss their forthcoming career plans; Micah Ortega recalled this meeting being the first time where opinions were sharply divided between members, primarily over whether to continue Five Iron Frenzy full-time or part-time. In light of several other contributing factors—not the least of which included Andrew Verdecchio's decision to leave the Christian faith and therefore the band—Five Iron Frenzy unanimously agreed to disband at the end of 2003, allowing themselves enough time to record a final album and embark on a "farewell tour" for the sake of their fans. The group officially announced their break-up in an open letter posted to their website on February 14, 2003, extensively thanking their fanbase and detailing their plans for their shows and releases up until what would be their final concert in November.

While recording what was intended to be their last studio album, Five Iron Frenzy released Cheeses...(of Nazareth), a 33-track compilation consisting of various unreleased songs, b-sides, demos, live recordings and improvised joke tracks. Despite being described as merely a parting gift to their fanbase, the album received national distribution through EMI and reached number 17 on Billboard's Top Heatseekers and number 22 on the Contemporary Christian charts. In June, the first pressing of Five Iron Frenzy's fifth and final album, The End is Near, was released independently and sold exclusively at the band's live shows.

Five Iron Frenzy spent the summer of 2003 performing at various high-profile Christian music festivals across the United States and Canada, including the Agape Music Festival in Illinois, the Alive Festival in Ohio, Lifest in Wisconsin, Spirit West Coast in California and the Florida and Illinois Cornerstone Festival. When the band finished their final set at the Illinois Cornerstone, the audience chanted "thank you" in unison as they left the stage. Five Iron Frenzy's final national tour, cheekily titled the "Winners Never Quit Tour", began in mid-September, spanning 58 shows across 31 states, supported by Christian artists Bleach, Holland and Cameron Jaymes. Prior to the tour's commencement, Five Iron Frenzy partnered with Rohi ministries in Kenya to open a children's rescue center and asked anyone attending their final tour to contribute at least one dollar to the fund. By the tour's end, the band had raised over $48,000 for what was unofficially called "The Five Iron Frenzy Rescue Center"; in a 2012 interview, Leanor Ortega-Till revealed the fund had ultimately raised over $60,000 from fan donations alone, which had helped open an additional center.

Five Iron Frenzy played their final show at the Fillmore Auditorium in Denver on November 22, 2003, supported by Relient K, Bleach and Cameron Jaymes, drawing a sold-out crowd of over 3,900 people. This show was professionally recorded to be released as the band's second live album titled The End is Here, which was packaged as a double-disc set with The End is Near for mainstream retail distribution. This version of the album, stylized as The End is ~~Near~~ Here, was released in April 2004 and met with modest commercial success, reaching number 10 on the Billboard Christian charts.

=== Hiatus and side projects (2004–2010) ===
Following the dissolution of Five Iron Frenzy, most of the band members parted ways to focus on their personal lives and pursue other musical endeavors, remaining active in numerous local bands.

Several members of Five Iron Frenzy continued to collaborate with each other beyond the band's initial break-up. Reese Roper, Dennis Culp, Keith Hoerig, Andrew Verdecchio and Scott Kerr were founding members of the conceptual Christian rock side project Brave Saint Saturn in 1999, and released So Far from Home on 5 Minute Walk in 2000. Roper, Culp, Hoerig and Verdecchio continued their work with Brave Saint Saturn after Five Iron Frenzy, releasing The Light of Things Hoped For in 2003 on Tooth & Nail Records and the self-released Anti-Meridian in 2008 before falling into an indefinite hiatus shortly after. Roper was also involved with the prospective pop punk supergroup Guerilla Rodeo, featuring Ethan Luck, John Warne, Josh Abbott of Ace Troubleshooter and Five Iron Frenzy's Sonnie Johnston. The band recorded a three-song EP in 2004 but the project never came to fruition and was instead gradually restructured into the solo project Roper, retaining only Roper as frontman and singer-songwriter. Roper released one album Brace Yourself for the Mediocre in late 2004 before disbanding the following year, upon which Roper retired to focus on a full-time career in nursing, though would occasionally contribute guest vocals to albums by bands including Showbread and The Insyderz.

Culp, having released his own solo album Ascents under the name Dennis Bayne in 2000 (on which Verdecchio also performed), founded the music and sound design studio Singing Serpent in 2005, composing music for television advertising as well as appearing as a guest musician on albums by bands including Rafter and Becoming the Archetype. Scott Kerr continued his work with Yellow Second, releasing three studio albums before disbanding in 2005; their final album, 2005's Altitude released on Floodgate Records, also featured Verdecchio as a member. Keith Hoerig and his wife Eryn formed the Denver-based alternative country band The Hollyfelds in 2006, independently recording and releasing two studio albums and two EPs before their disbandment in 2016. In the mid-to-late-2000s, Leanor Ortega-Till played alongside her husband Stephen Till in the nine-piece pop ensemble Hearts of Palm.

Roper and Leanor Ortega-Till also self-published books of their own poetry, Roper having published Spires to Babel in 2003 and More Than Paper Thin in 2004, and Ortega-Till having published It Must Look Pretty Appealing in 2003. In January 2004, Roper and Ortega-Till embarked on a brief spoken word tour with Mark Salomon of Stavesacre and Pigeon John of LA Symphony reading their own writings and poetry. Verdecchio has also since released books of his own writing, including the 2017 poetry collection October and the 2018 storybook Little.

In April 2010, Asian Man Records released the DVD The Rise and Fall of Five Iron Frenzy, a three-hour documentary on the band edited and narrated by Roper featuring new interviews with band members and unreleased archival footage, as well as a bonus disc containing all of the band's music videos and clips of various live performances throughout their career. Though the DVD received mixed reviews from Christian music publications - ranging from a perfect five-star rating by Jesus Freak Hideout praising its abundance of content to a two-star rating from Indie Vision Music criticizing its excessive runtime—Five Iron Frenzy nonetheless experienced a minor resurgence of renewed media interest, and members began giving numerous interviews together about the band's lasting legacy, including an extensive oral history published by the Denver Westword from Roper, Kerr, Verdecchio and Leanor Ortega-Till.

=== Reunion, Engine of a Million Plots, and Until This Shakes Apart (2011–present) ===
The prospect of a Five Iron Frenzy reunion was first discussed between band members during the filming of The Rise and Fall of Five Iron Frenzy in 2009. According to Roper, Scott Kerr was the first to express an interest in musically reconnecting with his former bandmates, though doubted the likelihood of a proper Five Iron Frenzy reunion and less so his role in such a reunion, having relinquished his original position in the band to Sonnie Johnston. After Keith Hoerig declined to participate in any type of Five Iron Frenzy reunion, Roper suggested that Kerr potentially return to the band as bassist, upon which Kerr began writing new material. Roper and Kerr discussed the logistics of reforming and writing new music for six months until a series of various life events including the birth of Roper's daughter and the relocation of several band members eventually prompted them to eventually abandon the idea.

In late 2011, Five Iron Frenzy's website was suddenly replaced by an unexplained countdown clock counting down to November 22, the eighth anniversary of the band's final show. Since 2006, the website had been operated as a fansite by fan Joel Gratcyk, who had at that time renewed the domain name and planned to surprise fans by launching a new site on November 22, though the vague countdown inadvertently fueled mass speculation among fans that Five Iron Frenzy themselves were going to announce a reunion on that date. Gratcyk contacted the band asking them to draft a formal apology to clarify the misunderstanding and dispel rumors of a reunion, though as Roper was in the process of doing so, instead decided to officially reform Five Iron Frenzy. The band chose to keep the news a secret and honor the November 22 reveal date, granting them enough time to write and record a new song and create a crowdfunding campaign for a new album on Kickstarter, both of which would be unveiled in conjunction with the announcement of their reunion.

Five Iron Frenzy formally announced their reunion on November 22, 2011, releasing their first new song in eight years, "It Was a Dark and Stormy Night", as a free digital download alongside a two-month Kickstarter campaign to help cover the costs of production for a new studio album set to be released in 2013. To the band's admitted shock and surprise, the campaign's initial financial goal of $30,000 was successfully met within 55 minutes and went on to ultimately raise $207,980 by 3,755 backers, breaking records as Kickstarter's then most funded musical project and attracting considerable media attention from news publications documenting the website's growing notoriety.

The next two years were spent working on the new album and playing select live dates. The band played their first reunion show on April 28, 2012, in Denver, Colorado. Engine of a Million Plots was released on November 26, 2013.

Until This Shakes Apart was released on January 15, 2021, after a successful Kickstarter campaign. A digital pre-release was available to Kickstarter backers on January 14, 2021.

In July 2022, the band announced on social media that they will play their first live show after 3 years, at the Gothic Theater in Denver, Colorado, on September 10, 2022. Since then, they have played a small number of shows and festivals throughout the United States each year.

== Religious affiliations and changes in faith ==
As a predominantly Christian band, most members of Five Iron Frenzy are involved in Christian ministry to varying degrees. Roper is a licensed pastor for the Alliance of Renewal Churches and the co-founder of Denver's non-denominational Scum of the Earth Church, of which saxophonist Leanor Ortega-Till formerly served as the Women and Arts pastor. In a 2016 interview, Ortega-Till listed the rest of the current lineup's denominational make up as including Calvinist, Pentecostal, Presbyterian, Church of Christ and Assemblies of God.

In 1998, Scott Kerr chose to leave Five Iron Frenzy after renouncing his Christian faith. According to Kerr, he had begun experiencing doubts in high school which eventually came to a head during his time touring with Five Iron Frenzy. In an attempt to reconcile his faith, Kerr fervently studied Christian apologetics—which he ultimately found "not persuasive and, at worst, intellectually disingenuous"—as well as works by David Hume and Bertrand Russell before deciding to leave Christianity. Though Kerr recalls the band accepting his revelation and decision to leave, Roper remorsefully recalled souring the relationship between them by him "pushing Jesus on [Kerr] when he needed me to just be his friend", which later served as the lyrical basis for Five Iron Frenzy's song "To Start a Fire". Upon re-joining Five Iron Frenzy in 2011, Kerr wrote an explanation for his reunion with the band which partly read:

If you asked each of us what Five Iron's mission is you might get 8 different answers, but from my perspective this band has no agenda other than to be authentic. It's about honesty. I am interested in a pure, artistic expression, regardless of whether or not I'm of the same opinion as the artist. Reese is a gifted lyricist, and I enjoy his words even though we have very different notions about the world. He talks about struggles with faith in a way that I can relate to, and though we came out of our respective struggles with different ideas I am still moved by the music we all make together.

Andrew Verdecchio experienced a similar loss of faith during the early 2000s, following the death of his father and the events of the September 11 attacks. Verdecchio largely recalls the comments of conservative commentators Pat Robertson and Jerry Falwell blaming the cause of the attacks on homosexuals for driving a wedge between himself and Christianity, leading him to seriously question his beliefs and role within a Christian band. Like Kerr, Verdecchio attempted to study apologetics "because I didn't want to not believe it", though said "the more I read these books and tried to convince myself, the less convinced I was". Upon renouncing his faith, Verdecchio requested to carry out one more tour with the band before quitting, upon which they decided to disband afterwards as Five Iron Frenzy did not wish to replace him. Verdecchio still identifies as an atheist.

Leanor Ortega-Till has also spoken about having struggled with severe doubts for a two-year period which caused her to try to avoid fans, though was ultimately able to "bounce back through her faith" and remains a practicing Christian.

== Members ==
=== Current members ===
- Reese Roper – lead vocals (1995–2003, 2011–present)
- Micah Ortega – lead guitars, vocals (1995–2003, 2011–present)
- Andrew Verdecchio – drums, vocals (1995–2003, 2011–present)
- Nathanael "Brad" Dunham – trumpet (1995–2003, 2011–present)
- Dennis Culp – trombone, vocals (1995–2003, 2011–present)
- Leanor "Jeff the Girl" Ortega-Till – saxophone, vocals (1995–2003, 2011–present)
- Scott Kerr – bass (2011–present), guitars (1995–1998), vocals (1995–1998, 2011–present)
- Sonnie Johnston – guitars (1998–2003, 2011–present)

=== Former members ===
- Keith Hoerig – bass (1995–2003)

=== Touring musicians ===
- Seth Hecox – guitar (2013)

== Discography ==
Studio albums

- Upbeats and Beatdowns (1996)
- Our Newest Album Ever! (1997)
- Quantity Is Job 1 EP (1998)
- All the Hype That Money Can Buy (2000)
- Five Iron Frenzy 2: Electric Boogaloo (2001)
- The End Is Near (2003)
- Engine of a Million Plots (2013)
- Between Pavement and Stars EP (2015)
- Until This Shakes Apart (2021)

== Tours ==
- "Rock Your Socks Off" w/The Altered and The Echoing Green – Fall 1997
- "El Doc Tour" w/The Echoing Green, The Electrics, and The W's – March 1998
- "Ska Against Racism" w/The Toasters, Less Than Jake, Blue Meanies, Mustard Plug, MU330, Kemuri, and Mike Park – Spring 1998
- "Ham Jam" w/The W's, Relient K, Philmore and Soul-Junk – Summer 2000
- "Electric Youth" w/Relient K, John Reuben and Ace Troubleshooter – Fall 2001
- "Winners Never Quit" w/Bleach, Holland, and Cameron Jaymes – Fall 2003
