= Masaki Liu =

American music engineer and producer

Masaki Liu, sometimes referred to as "Saki", is the engineer and producer operating One Way Studio, a digital recording studio in Benicia, California. Liu has recorded and produced music for many bands, including Five Iron Frenzy, Black Rebel Motorcycle Club, The Echoing Green, The W's and Yellow Second.

Masaki is also a musician, playing strings and guitars on several albums. He founded the Instrumental rock band Rivulets and Violets. Rivulets released two albums, Rivulets and Violets in 1994 on Eden Records, and Promise in 2000 on Five Minute Walk. Promise contained some lyrics, written by Masaki and Jen Hollingsworth. Musically the album was said to have a simple sound that obscured its hidden layers of complexity, which was attributed to the fact that "Liu is a studio whiz." He also played guitar in the band Dime Store Prophets, which released two studio recordings: Love is Against the Grain in 1995 and Fantastic Distraction in 1997.
