= Dennis Culp =

- Also known as: Dennis Bayne
- Born: April 23, 1970 (age 54); Denver, Colorado, U.S.
- Genres: Ska punk, Alternative Indie,
- Instruments: Trombone, vocals, bass, guitar

Dennis Culp (born April 23, 1970) is an American trombonist and singer-songwriter best known for his work with the bands Brave Saint Saturn and Five Iron Frenzy.

== Career ==
Culp has released one solo album, Ascents, under the name Dennis Bayne. Culp is a member of the band Roam, which began in 2010 and released one EP. He is also the CFO, owner, and Executive Producer at Singing Serpent, a firm providing music for the television advertising industry. Their clients include Toshiba, Sprint, McDonald's, and many other major companies.

Culp provided horns for the soundtrack of the third episode of Sockbaby. He also composed music for Call + Response, a 2008 documentary.

== Personal life ==
Culp resides in New Jersey with his wife, Melinda.
