= 7ball =

American Christian music magazine

- subtitled as "Modern Music on Cue"
- Editor In Chief: Chris Well
- Categories: Christian alternative music
- Frequency: Bimonthly
- First issue: July/August 1995
- Final issue: 2004
- Company: Royal Magazine Group; Voxcorp
- Based in: Nashville, Tennessee
- ISSN: 1082-3980

7ball is a discontinued Christian music magazine, first published in 1995. They focused on rock, hip-hop, and other "alternative" forms of Christian music. The magazine was initially published by the Royal Magazine Group (a division of Thomas Nelson) alongside Release magazine and others. Its primary competition were magazines such as HM, True Tunes News, and CCM.

== Background ==
7ball magazine was initially edited by Chris Well, former editor of the Christian rock magazine Syndicate, until 1996. In 1996, the magazine was sold to VoxCorp (Nashville). Well was promoted to editor in chief of the entire company, overseeing 7ball, Release, and others, and former CCM assistant editor Bruce A. Brown was hired as managing editor of 7ball. Brown edited through the end of 1997, and was eventually replaced by Cameron Strang.

In early 1999 7ball gained distribution to Family Christian Stores, the largest Christian bookstore chain. HM Magazine editor Doug Van Pelt would later report that during its tenure 7ball cost them some of their advertising base. Strang edited into 2001, then founded the Relevant Media Group, which began publishing Relevant Magazine in 2003.

7ball ceased publication in 2004.
