= 5 Minute Walk =

American independent record label

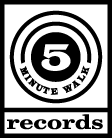
- Founded: 1995
- Founder: Frank Tate
- Defunct: 2004
- Distributors: Diamante Music Group, Chordant/EMI
- Genre: Christian rock
- Country of origin: U.S.
- Location: Concord, California
- Official website: www.5minutewalk.com

5 Minute Walk was an independent record label founded by Frank Tate in April 1995. Operations were based in Concord, California in the back offices of The Screem, a music club operated by Tate. They only carried Christian bands and considered themselves to be a Christian ministry. Most records were produced by Masaki Liu at Masaki's One Way Studio and executive produced by Frank Tate.

== Operations ==
Records released under 5 Minute Walk were distributed by Diamante Music Group until September 1998. They then struck a deal with Forefront Records to distribute through EMI-owned Chordant Distribution in Christian markets and directly by EMI Distribution in mainstream markets. They also had a sublabel, SaraBellum Records, founded in 1997. Records released on the SaraBellum imprint were targeted at the general market, and distributed by the Warner Music Group. Albums were often released on both labels simultaneously. Sarabellum was folded back into 5 Minute Walk in 2001 as the label changed distribution to EMI.

Their first release was Deeper Than Skies by My Brother's Mother in 1995. In approximately 2001 the label dropped all artists from its roster except Five Iron Frenzy. When Five Iron disbanded at the end of 2003, lead singer Reese Roper signed under the name "Roper." The group released one album, Brace Yourself for the Mediocre, in late 2004 and toured nationally before disbanding.

== Ministry ==
"If we're going to call this Christian music, then it should be doing something Christ-like."

— Jeremy Post, Guitarist for 5 Minute Walk band Black Eyed Sceva.

Many of their records and tours raised money for charity causes. Artists involved in these tours sometimes played without payment, and included off-label bands such as Sixpence None the Richer, the Lost Dogs, and Poor Old Lu. These operations were at the direction of Frank Tate who, previous to the label's founding and as manager for The Prayer Chain and The 77s, raised money to send 72 HIV infected children to Disneyland. Tours often took donations such as socks, blankets, and jackets and gave the collections to local homeless shelters. Certain albums raised money for world hunger related causes. The company also ran a food and medical center in Tijuana, Mexico that fed upwards of 150 children each day and contributed to an orphanage in Tijuana.

Five Minute Walk tours were not restricted to "Christian friendly" venues such as churches, as bars and non-traditional venues such as roller skating rinks were considered ministry opportunities. Typically their bands would not preach to the crowds, but let the music carry the message to the listener. The approach of the label was to ensure the bands were spiritually healthy so that they could effectively transmit the Gospel message. The labels lyrical approach, as explained by Frank Tate, was "...if you search the lyrics and ponder what they're saying, you'll hear the hope that they've found. But you're not going to come to one of our shows and get banged over the head with a Bible." Five Iron Frenzy participated in the 1998 Ska Against Racism tour, which raised awareness of and money for anti-racism causes. Five Iron also participated in the Vans Warped Tour in 2002.

== Slogan ==
"Love God, Love Others, Take Time to Listen."

Excerpted from an interview between Harmon Leon and Frank Tate:

If you spend five minutes a day talking to Jesus like you would a friend, He would become your friend. I know it sounds weird, but I challenge you to give it a try. The next time you're bummed, lonely, scared or frustrated, go for a five-minute walk and talk to Him like you would a friend. Tell Him exactly how you feel and what you're thinking.

== Bands ==
- Brave Saint Saturn (Active, with Department of Biophysics)
- Dime Store Prophets (Disbanded; members went on to form Tremolo)
- Dryve (Disbanded; members went on to join Marjorie Fair and Tremolo)
- The Echoing Green (Active, with A Different Drum Records)
- The Electrics (Inactive)
- Five Iron Frenzy (Active)
- Justin McRoberts (Active, currently unsigned)
- Model Engine/Black Eyed Sceva (Disbanded)
- Mortal (On Hiatus; members went on to join Fold Zandura and Switchfoot)
- My Brother's Mother (Disbanded)
- Philmore (Inactive)
- Rivulets and Violets (Disbanded)
- Roper (Disbanded)
- Rose Blossom Punch (Disbanded; members now in Fair)
- Seven Day Jesus (Disbanded; members went on to join The O.C. Supertones, The Red Velvet, and Audio Adrenaline)
- Sherri Youngward (Active, currently unsigned)
- Soul-Junk (Active, with Quiver Society! Records)
- The Smiley Kids (Disbanded)
- The W's (Disbanded; members went on to join The O.C. Supertones, Bendixon, and Alpha Charlie)
- Yum Yum Children (Active, currently unsigned)

== See also ==
- List of Christian record labels
