= Space-themed music =

Music genre

Space-themed music is any music, from any genre or style, with lyrics or titles relating to outer space or spaceflight.

Songs or other musical forms influenced by the concept of outer space have appeared in music throughout history, both in instrumental and vocal pieces with lyrics. As early as Ancient Greece, Pythagoras believed in something called the "harmony of the spheres". He believed that since planets and the stars all moved in the universe according to mathematical equations that these mathematical equations could be translated into musical notes and thus produce a symphony. This idea was explored further throughout Western history under the theories of Musica universalis. Some more recent and widely different examples are The Planets by Gustav Holst, and the song "Space Oddity" by David Bowie. Outer space also appears as a theme in "Space Age" retro pop music, such as Stereolab's Space-Age Bachelor Pad Music.

Music about outer space attracts enthusiastic listeners from all walks of life. Some have created web pages to share their interests. NASA, JPL, and the US government's Centennial of Flight Commission have webpages showcasing and discussing music about outer space.

== Music about outer space ==
In 1777, Joseph Haydn's opera "Il mondo della luna"("The world on the moon") premiered.

Author and classical music critic David Hurwitz describes Joseph Haydn's choral and chamber orchestra piece, The Creation, composed in 1798, as space music, both in the sense of the sound of the music, ("a genuine piece of 'space music' featuring softly pulsating high violins and winds above low cellos and basses, with nothing at all in the middle ... The space music gradually drifts towards a return to the movement's opening gesture ... "); and in the manner of its composition, relating that Haydn conceived The Creation after discussing music and astronomy with William Herschel, oboist and astronomer (discoverer of the planet Uranus).

1875 saw the premiere of the opera~féerie spectacle "Le voyage dans la Lune"("A trip to the moon") by Jacques Offenbach.

=== 20th century ===
"Fly Me to the Moon" was written in 1954 by Bart Howard and first recorded by Kaye Ballard, the same year. The most famous version of the song is the 1964 recording by Frank Sinatra.

In 1958, Karl-Birger Blomdahl composed an opera Aniara to a libretto by Erik Lindegren based on the poem Aniara by Harry Martinson, a tragedy set aboard a spaceship.

In 1958, Russ Garcia recorded an exotica album called Fantastica on Capitol Records that was about space travel.

The Tornados reached the top of the charts in both the US and the UK with their instrumental "Telstar" in December 1962.

In 1966 Barry Gray wrote several space music pieces for the science-fiction film Thunderbirds Are Go.

In 1969, David Bowie released the single "Space Oddity". The single peaked at 15 on the US charts, becoming Bowie's first success. The song describes the story of a fictional astronaut known as "Major Tom" whose spaceship has an electrical fault. Major Tom is mentioned or referenced in several of Bowie's songs including, "Ashes to Ashes", "Hallo Spaceboy" and "Blackstar".

In 1969, The Beatles released the single "Across the Universe". On 4 February 2008, this was the first song that NASA beamed directly into deep space. The signal was transmitted through the NASA Deep Space Network and directed towards Polaris.

In 1972, Elton John released the single "Rocket Man". Lou Reed's "Satellite of Love" was also released in 1972. Morrissey and U2 have both covered the song.

Again in 1972, Hawkwind recorded and released the song "Space is Deep" and then performed their Space Ritual, which was an opera about a crew of astronauts dreaming in hibernation.

Also in 1972 Tangerine Dream released their double album Zeit, featuring space-related track titles such as "Birth of Liquid Plejades" and "Nebulous Dawn", as well as cover art depicting a solar eclipse. It is considered one of the first (possibly the first) dark ambient albums.

Eduard Artemyev has made space-themed music, for example for the space film Solaris (1972), although his best known and successfully covered space-themed sounding piece might be the theme song for non-space film Siberiade (1979).

In 1973, Montrose released "Space Station #5" as a single from their self-titled debut album. The song was covered by Iron Maiden in 1992. For Montrose's followup album in 1974, Paper Money, they recorded "Spaceage Sacrifice" and the instrumental "Starliner". Montrose's first lead singer, Sammy Hagar, went on to record the title track of his album Marching to Mars, which was released in 1997.

In 1975, the song "'39" was released on the album A Night at the Opera by Queen. The song relates the voyage of 20 volunteers to another star system. While the volunteers perceive the trip as being only a year, 100 years pass on Earth as a consequence of time dilation as described by Einstein's theory of special relativity, and, consequently, return to find their loved ones either no longer alive or of advanced age. The song was written and sung by Brian May, who went on to complete his PhD in astrophysics in 2008, with backing vocals sung by Freddie Mercury and Roger Taylor. In 1983, Brian May's solo Star Fleet Project featured Eddie Van Halen. The song "Star Fleet" was a cover version of the ending theme song from the children's sci-fi television series Star Fleet.

In 1976, Canadian band Klaatu released the song "Calling Occupants of Interplanetary Craft", which was covered by the American duo The Carpenters the following year.

The Japanese musician Isao Tomita has produced many albums with space-based themes, such as The Planets (1976), his version of Holst's suite; Kosmos (1978); Bermuda Triangle (1979); Dawn Chorus (Canon of the Three Stars) (1984); Space Walk – Impressions Of An Astronaut (compilation, 1984); Mind of the Universe – Live at Linz (1985); Back to the Earth – Live in New York (1988); and Nasca Fantasy (supporting Kodo, 1994).

The Vangelis album Albedo 0.39 (1976) is entirely devoted to space, while a segment of Heaven and Hell (1975) was used as the theme to the PBS television series Cosmos by Carl Sagan. His work Mythodea: Music for NASA's Mars Odyssey Mission is reflective of his interest in space exploration.

The Police's "Walking on the Moon" single was released in 1979. The accompanying music video was filmed at the Kennedy Space Center in Florida, with the band performing in front of the Saturn V displayed outside the Vehicle Assembly Building. During the video, the band's drummer, Stewart Copeland, plays the Saturn V as a percussion instrument. The video also contains footage from the Gemini missions and the Apollo moon landings.

Also released in 1979 was Sheila and B. Devotion's disco single "Spacer".

Electric Light Orchestra's "Ticket to the Moon" was released as a single in 1981.

Jean-Michel Jarre's 1986 album Rendez-Vous finished with "Last Rendez-Vous (Ron's Piece)", which was intended to have had a saxophone part played by astronaut Ron McNair, while aboard the Space Shuttle Challenger. This would have been the first piece of music recorded in space. However, the Space Shuttle Challenger disaster ended this possibility. The track was subsequently dedicated to McNair and the rest of the Challenger crew. In 1983, Jarre had recorded "Moon Machine". This was also released in 1986, but as a 12" single B-side. In 2000, Jarre's Métamorphoses album contained the tracks "Hey Gagarin" and "Miss Moon". His Electronica 1: The Time Machine album of 2015 contained the track "Zero Gravity", which was recorded with Tangerine Dream, and "Stardust", a collaboration with Armin Van Buuren.

Europe's single "The Final Countdown" was also released in 1986. The lyrics are about a fictional interplanetary trip to Venus.

In 1987, David Bowie's Major Tom character, Lou Reed's "Satellite of Love" and Elton John's "Rocket Man" were mentioned in Def Leppard's "Rocket". This song also features samples of dialogue from the Apollo 11 mission. The same year, the music video of MARRS's "Pump Up the Volume" featured footage from the launch of Apollo 6, moonwalkers during the Apollo program, the Mercury 7 astronauts, cosmonauts of the Soviet space program, and CGI footage of the Voyager space probes.

The Orchestral Manoeuvres in the Dark track "Apollo XI" (1991), from the album Sugar Tax, features sample collages of moon-landing broadcasts.

Tasmin Archer's "Sleeping Satellite" single was released in 1992. In 2021, Archer stated that the song "isn’t a criticism of man’s arrogance in leaving Earth, but more about the lack of further space exploration that might have led to a better understanding of ecological issues."

Mike Oldfield's 1994 album The Songs of Distant Earth was based on Arthur C. Clarke's SF novel Songs of Distant Earth. The album's opening track, "In the Beginning", features a recording of the Apollo 8 Genesis reading.

Jamiroquai's The Return of the Space Cowboy album was also released in 1994, featuring the songs "Space Cowboy", "Light Years" and "Mr. Moon". Two years later, the band released the song "Cosmic Girl".

Guitarist Joe Satriani has recorded several pieces of space-themed instrumental music: "Raspberry Jam Delta-v" from his 1998 album Crystal Planet, the title track from his 2004 album Is There Love In Space?, "Redshift Riders" from his 2006 album Super Colossal, "Light Years Away" and "Wormhole Wizards" from his 2010 album Black Swans and Wormhole Wizards, and the title track of his 2015 album Shockwave Supernova.

Other pop songs also mention outer space, such as Chris de Burgh's "A Spaceman Came Travelling", the Bonzo Dog Band's "I'm the Urban Spaceman", "Major Tom (Coming Home)" by Peter Schilling, and Deep Purple's "Space Truckin'". To Our Children's Children's Children by The Moody Blues was a 1969 album inspired by spaceflight.

Several albums have featured music inspired by the Apollo space program. In 1983, Brian Eno with his brother Roger Eno and producer/recording artist Daniel Lanois, composed the score for the film For All Mankind, a documentary of NASA's Apollo program; an album of the music, Apollo: Atmospheres and Soundtracks, was later released. On The Orb's 1991 two-disc debut album, Adventures Beyond the Ultraworld, disc one of features an ambient musical simulation of the Apollo 11 Moon journey, including excerpts of NASA recordings of the radio conversations between Mission Control and the astronauts in space.

The filk anthology albums Minus Ten and Counting (1983) and To Touch the Stars (2003) celebrate and promote the exploration of outer space.

=== 21st century ===
In 2012, Van Halen's A Different Kind of Truth album was released, containing the song "Outta Space". Previously, the band's "Top of the World" music video, from 1991, featured footage from the first thirty years of NASA's human spaceflight programs.

In 2016, Avenged Sevenfold released their album, The Stage, a concept album about space, the universe, the human race, and artificial intelligence. The song "Exist" contains a spoken word section written and performed by astrophysicist Neil deGrasse Tyson.

On May 11, 2018 Arctic Monkeys released the album “Tranquility Base Hotel & Casino”. The album is a concept album based around a fictional hotel and casino built at Tranquility Base, the site of the 1969 Moon landing.

To commemorate the 50th anniversary of the Apollo 11 Moon landing in 2019, Julianne Regan and Tim Bricheno of All About Eve, released a video and song called Pale Blue Earth.

Sam Ryder's song "Space Man" placed second at the Eurovision Song Contest 2022, while representing the United Kingdom. The song's lyrics imagine the scenario of a lonely and homesick astronaut, in search of other life.

Another band to use space as musical inspiration is the Christian "Astro-Rock" group Brave Saint Saturn, whose three albums, So Far from Home, The Light of Things Hoped For, and Anti-Meridian, form a trilogy that chronicles the journey of the fictional spaceship, the USS Gloria, on a trip to survey the moons of Saturn. The music uses space narratives, lingo, samples and quotes to portray the journey.

== Soundtracks for films and television shows about outer space ==
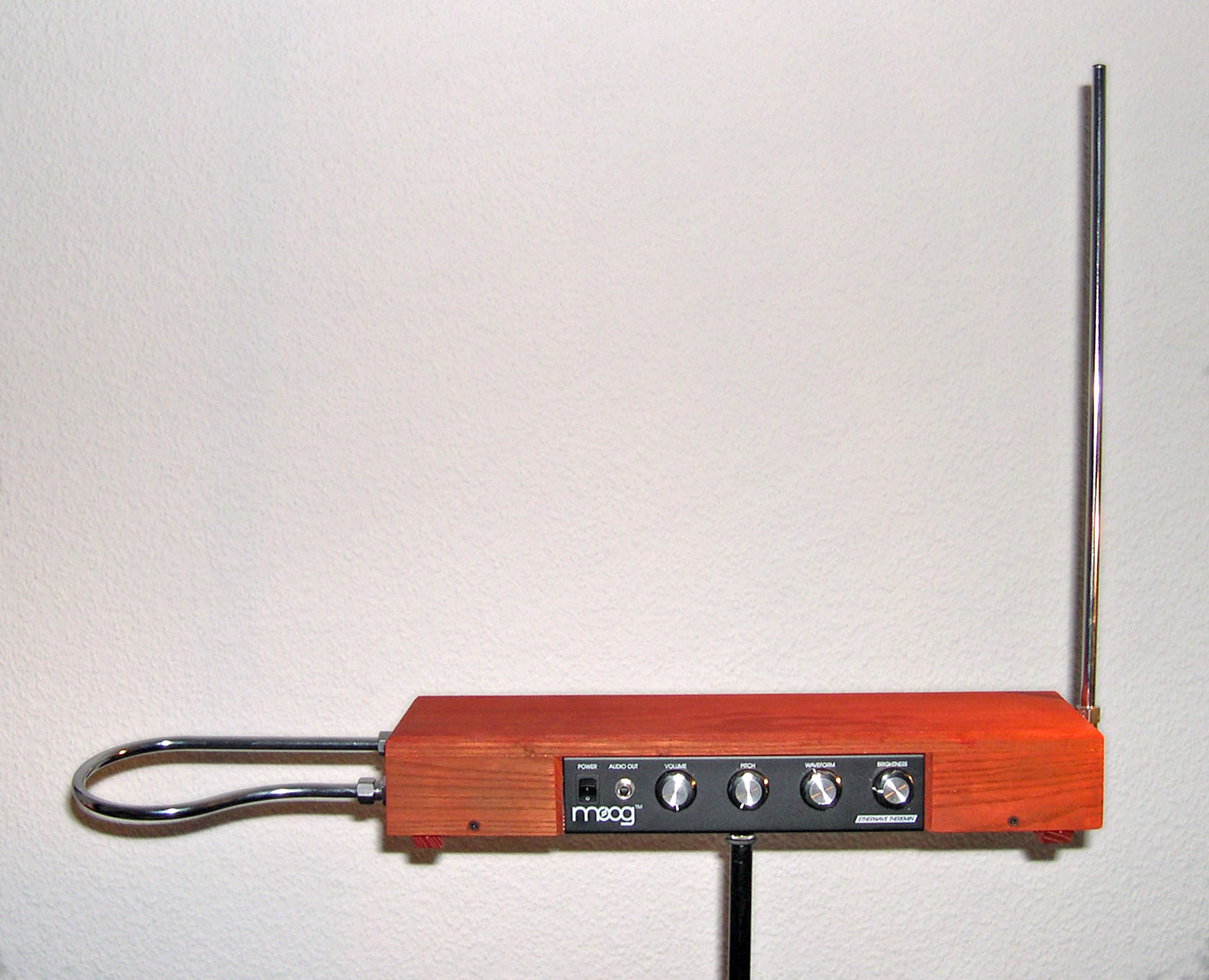
An Etherwave-Theremin, assembled from Robert Moog's kit: the loop antenna on the left controls the volume while the upright antenna controls the pitch

Epro theremin in middle range
A Bach piece played by Italian thereminist Fabio Pesce on a Moog Etherwave theremin.

Soundtracks of science fiction films and television and radio series often feature music associated with outer space, such as Star Wars, Star Trek, Doctor Who, The Hitchhiker's Guide to the Galaxy, Red Dwarf, The X-Files, Flash Gordon and others.

The theremin is an electronic musical instrument associated with a very eerie sound, which has led to its use in movie soundtracks such as those in The Day the Earth Stood Still.

== Music played in planetariums and observatories ==
Many forms of music are used in observatory and planetarium shows, particularly genres such as electronic music, classical music, space music, and space rock. Some artists, such as Geodesium, specialize in creating custom music for Planetariums.

During the 1970s, IMAX's OMNIMAX (now IMAX Dome) film system was conceived to operate on planetarium screens. More recently, some planetariums have re-branded themselves as "dome theaters," with broader offerings including wide-screen or "wraparound" films, fulldome video, and laser shows that combine music with laser-drawn patterns.

== Music made with sounds of outer space ==
Energy sources in the atmosphere, such as lightning, can produce sounds (sferics, tweeks, and whistlers) in the very low frequency (VLF) radio band.

Objects in space – the Sun, planets, stars, quasars, pulsars, galaxies, and active galaxies – all produce signals that, if received (usually through radio astronomy dishes and processed), can be used by a musician as the basis for any kind of composition imaginable.

Scientists with an interest in space-based sounds include:

- Don Gurnett.
- .
- Alexander Kosovichev, a Stanford scientist whose researches into the Sun's oscillations (and who uploaded the sounds to the net) encouraged Stephen Taylor (see below) to create his album.
- Dr. Fiorella Terenzi has created several works that use sounds derived from celestial radio signals homepage, Space.com entry.
- NASA produced a CD in 1992 from Voyager 1 and Voyager 2 recordings of electromagnetic fields processed with digital sampling techniques.

Artists/bands who have included space sounds in their works include:

- Hawkwind
- Terry Riley, along with the Kronos Quartet, in their album Sun Rings, which used "sounds of the planets recorded by the Voyager mission on its journey to deep space" .
- Stephen Taylor, in the album The Heart of the Sun.
- Robert Schroeder's album Galaxie Cygnus-A used interstellar noise from the distant galaxy in the title
- Billy Yfantis, used sounds recorded on Mars in the track "Landing" (Album: Entering the Solar System).
