= Mark Petersen =

Mark Petersen may refer to:

- Mark E. Petersen (1900–1984), member of the Quorum of the Twelve Apostles of The Church of Jesus Christ of Latter-day Saints
- Mark Petersen (musician), New Zealand rock guitarist
- Mark C. Petersen, composer who created Geodesium, which is music for Planetarium shows

== See also ==
- Mark Peterson (disambiguation)
