= Let There Be Light (song) =

Single by Mike Oldfield

from the album The Songs of Distant Earth
- B-side: "Indian Lake"
- Released: 21 August 1995
- Genre: Ambient
- Length: 3:38
- Label: Warner Music UK
- Songwriter(s): Mike Oldfield
- Producer(s): Mike Oldfield

Mike Oldfield singles chronology
"Hibernaculum" (1994)	"Let There Be Light" (1995)	"Women of Ireland" (1997)

CD single 2

"Let There Be Light" is a single by musician Mike Oldfield, released in 1995. It is from the album The Songs of Distant Earth and uses audio from the Apollo 8 space mission. For the intro, the single uses the Apollo 8 Genesis reading.

== Charts ==
It charted at number 51 on the UK Singles Chart on 2 September 1995.

== Music video ==
The second pressing of the enhanced CD album (one of the first enhanced CDs) contains the full version of the "Let There Be Light" video. Footage from the "Let There Be Light" music video also appeared in the BBC science fiction documentary series Future Fantastic. The music video was directed by Howard Greenhalgh.

== Track listing ==
=== UK CD 1 ===
1. "Let There Be Light" (Mike Oldfield)
2. "Let There Be Light" (BT's Pure Luminescence Remix) (Mike Oldfield)
3. "Let There Be Light" (The Ultraviolet Mix) (Mike Oldfield)
4. "Let There Be Light" (Hardfloor Remix) (Mike Oldfield)

=== UK CD 2 ===
1. "Let There Be Light" (Mike Oldfield)
2. "Indian Lake" (Mike Oldfield)
3. "Let There Be Light" (BT's Entropic Dub) (Mike Oldfield)

=== USA CD ===
1. "Let There Be Light" (Mike Oldfield)
2. "Let There Be Light" (BT's Pure Luminescence Remix) (Mike Oldfield)
3. "Let There Be Light" (The Ultraviolet Mix) (Mike Oldfield)
4. "Let There Be Light" (Hardfloor Remix) (Mike Oldfield)
5. "Let There Be Light" (Hardfloor Dub) (Mike Oldfield)
6. "Let There Be Light" (BT's Entropic Dub) (Mike Oldfield)
