= Mark Peterson =

Mark Peterson may refer to:

- Mark Peterson (soccer) (1960–2011), American soccer forward
- Mark Peterson (district attorney) (born 1958), American politician
- Mark Peterson (photographer) (born 1955), American photographer
- Mark Peterson, American historian and professor at Yale University
- Mark A. Peterson, American Koreanist

== See also ==
- Mark Petersen (disambiguation)
