= The Songs of Distant Earth =

1986 English-language utopian novel by Arthur C. Clarke

- Cover of the first UK edition
- Author: Arthur C. Clarke
- Cover artist: Michael Whelan
- Language: English
- Genre: Science fiction
- Publisher: Grafton Books (UK); Del Rey Books (US)
- Publication date: 1986
- Publication place: United Kingdom
- Media type: Print (Hardcover and Paperback)
- Pages: 256
- ISBN: 0-345-33219-9
- OCLC: 12807679
- Dewey Decimal: 823/.914 19
- LC Class: PR6005.L36 S66 1986

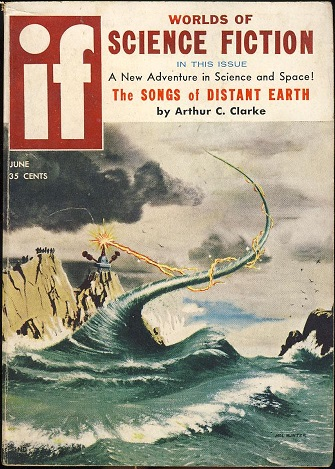
The original novelette "The Songs of Distant Earth" was the cover story for the June 1958 issue of If. Cover art by Mel Hunter

The Songs of Distant Earth is a 1986 science fiction novel by British writer Arthur C. Clarke, based upon his 1958 short story of the same title. Of all of his novels, Clarke stated that this was his favourite. Prior to the publishing of the novel, Clarke also wrote a short step outline with the same title, published in Omni magazine and anthologised in The Sentinel in 1983.

The story is set in the 39th century and depicts the journey of the spaceship Magellan as it carries a large group of colonists in suspended animation to a distant planet after Earth's sun goes nova. En route, it has to stop for repairs at the planet Thalassa, which was colonised 700 years earlier but the colonists there lost contact with Earth for the past couple of centuries. The story delves into the cultural and emotional impact of the distant Earth’s demise on both sets of colonists, and how humans from two different worlds and societies interact with each other.

The novel explores apocalyptic, atheistic, and utopian ideas, as well as the effects of long-term interstellar travel, high technology, and extra-terrestrial life. Additional themes include human survival, adaptation, and the challenges of starting anew on an alien world.

== Plot summary ==
The novel is set in the early 3800s and takes place almost entirely on the faraway oceanic planet of Thalassa. Thalassa has a relatively small human population, now in the tens of thousands, sent there by way of an embryonic seed pod by Earth centuries earlier.

Among the Thalassans are the marine biologist Brant, his partner Mirissa and her brother Kumar. They are typical examples of Thalassan culture; quiet, stable, and free from religion and supernatural influence. Their peaceful existence is changed with the arrival of the Magellan, an interstellar spaceship from Earth containing almost a million colonists who have been put into cryonic suspension for a five century-long voyage to the planet Sagan Two, which they aim to terraform and colonize.

As shown in an explanation of their arrival, scientists in the 1960s discover that the neutrino emissions from the Sun – a result of the nuclear reactions that fuel the star – are far diminished from expected levels. It is confirmed that the Sun will become a nova around the year AD 3600.

Over the centuries, humanity develops advanced technology to send out seeding ships containing human and other mammalian embryos (and later on, simply stored DNA sequences) to planets considered habitable. One such ship is sent to the far-off ocean world of Thalassa and successfully establishes a small human colony in the year 3109. Sending live humans was deemed unfeasible at that time due to the immense amount of fuel required. However, this limitation is eventually overcome with the development of the "Quantum Drive" – an engine that utilizes zero point energy – less than a hundred years before the Sun is set to become a nova. This breakthrough allows for the construction of a fleet of massive, crewed interstellar vehicles, including the Magellan, whose crew witnesses the detonation of the Sun and the destruction of Earth only three years after launch.

In the intervening years, the colony on Thalassa loses contact with Earth due to the destruction of its communication abilities by a volcanic eruption 400 years after its founding. The Thalassans are therefore unaware of later developments on Earth, including crewed interstellar travel. Earth assumes the colony was either destroyed or reverted to barbarism.

More than 200 years after the end of Earth, the Magellan arrives at Thalassa, approaching the midpoint of its voyage to Sagan Two. Primarily, the objective is to replenish the ship's mammoth ice shield that had prevented damage during its interstellar journey. Thalassa is the obvious choice for this operation, as 95% of the planet's surface is covered by water. However, it soon becomes apparent that the human colony there is still present and flourishing. Aboard the Magellan, several crew members are awakened to undertake the mission, while most of the 900,000 sleeping passengers remain in hibernation. Among the crew is Loren Lorenson, a young engineer, and Moses Kaldor, an eminent statesman.

The Thalassans, who never expected to hear from any other humans, are just as stunned as the crew of the Magellan. Loren and Mirissa quickly fall in love. However they're tested by the different social norms of the two cultures, as the Thalassans appear free from monogamy and "sexual possessiveness", a situation that the lonely and troubled crew quickly find out.

Due to this and other aspects of the Thalassans' way of life, and the duration of the stay on the planet to repair the ship's ice shield, a small contingent of the Magellan crew quickly becomes disenchanted with the original objective of their mission to Sagan 2, leading to a threat of mutiny.

A more gentle and parental relationship also develops between Mirissa and Moses, a man deeply affected by the destruction of Earth and the loss of his wife. Moses soon provides Mirissa an insight into the culture and ways of Earth lost to the Thalassans, including the concepts of war and religion, both alien to Mirissa and her people.

Due to the construction of a massive plant for freezing the huge ice blocks for the shield, the Terrans and the Thalassans become aware of the existence of potentially intelligent sea creatures living in the depths of the Thalassan oceans. The "scorps" are similar to the sea scorpions of Earth, only much larger. It soon becomes evident that the scorps are responsible for the theft of metals and wire from several Thalassan underwater projects. Moses believes they may have the potential for developing into a future intelligent species.

Several unforeseen events occur that shatter the dream of life on Thalassa and remind the Magellan crew that they must continue their mission, and leave the Thalassans to their own destiny. This ends the relationship between Mirissa and Loren. Mirissa chooses to conceive a child by Loren, but a change in scheduling of the mission brought about by the threat of mutiny by the crew means he will never see his son. Brant accepts the child as his own.

The dissatisfied elements of the Magellan crew are left to live on Thalassa as requested. The Magellan departs, and three centuries later finally arrives at Sagan Two. Loren views the numerous messages and video logs sent from Thalassa while he was in hibernation and witnesses the lives of Mirissa and his child, both long dead.

== Scientific aspects ==
The novel explores one possible outcome of the solar neutrino problem, which was unsolved when Clarke wrote the work but has since been explained. There seemed to be a lack of neutrinos reaching the Earth from the Sun, because scientists were only looking for one particular state of the neutrino particle.

In the 'Acknowledgements' section of the book, Clarke explains why he chose vacuum energy for spacecraft propulsion – speculated as scientifically viable, but highly futuristic technology.

The novel also features a space elevator, a concept that Clarke has used in previous works (most prominently in his 1979 novel The Fountains of Paradise).

In his introduction to the novel, Clarke states that he wished the work to deal with a realistic interstellar voyage, without the use of warp drives or other fantastic faster-than-light technologies that provide near-instantaneous interstellar travel in which light years are traversed in days, hours, or even minutes (such as in the Star Wars and Star Trek franchises) as opposed to years, decades or centuries. Despite the exotic nature of its quantum drive, the starship Magellan takes 212 years to travel the 50 light years to Thalassa.

== Setting ==
In the story, there are 10 known colonies of Earth, most of which have lost contact with Earth. Several planets are mentioned by name:

- Earth is the Mother world to the human race, destroyed over 200 years prior to the story due to the Sun going nova. The Magellan was the last colony ship to leave before the sun exploded. The word "Earth" is hard for the people of Thalassa to say due to its loss.
- Thalassa is the world on which most of the story takes place. 50 light years from Earth, it is an ocean world with three volcanic islands, and its own aquatic biota. The planet was colonised by a seed ship in the year 3109. The protagonists live on the southern of the three inhabited islands, and based on the limited physical descriptions and their names, they appear to be of mixed ethnic background.
- Pasadena is a planet in orbit around Alpha Centauri A, just over 4 light years from Earth. Although Earth has lost contact with the colony there, it may still be thriving.
- Sagan Two is the destination of the star ship Magellan, located 75 light years from Thalassa. The Magellan finally reaches Sagan Two in the year 4135. It is an untouched but Mars-like icy planet, larger than Earth, with about forty percent ocean and a mean temperature of twenty-five degrees Fahrenheit. Named for science communicator Carl Sagan, it has a pure nitrogen atmosphere that is terraformed by the Magellan's crew after arrival.
- Sirius X is a colony of Earth mentioned in the story.

== Adaptations ==
No screen adaptations of the novel have been made, though the original 1958 short story was adapted as a radio play by the BBC in 1962, directed by Charles Parr and produced by John Gibson. Writing in The Observer, Paul Ferris opined that it was "better than the average space fiction" and it contained a "shuddery juxtaposition of complicated technology and simple fear."

== Cross-media influences ==
Multi-instrumentalist and composer Mike Oldfield wrote an entire album based on – and entitled – The Songs of Distant Earth, which was released in 1994. The album has a foreword written by Clarke. Oldfield included a CD-ROM multi-media interactive exploration animation software on some of the locations from the book, including the "Hibernaculum". The album has been re-released in a package with the original short story, the movie outline and the CD-ROM.

The ending song and final chapter of Muv-Luv Unlimited are both named after The Songs of Distant Earth, following the theme of every chapter having been named after a relevant or semi-relevant sci-fi story.

The final part of 1987 science fiction anime Space Fantasia 2001 Nights is named "The Songs of Distant Earth".

== Reception ==
The Songs of Distant Earth received a positive review from Gerald Jonas in The New York Times. Jonas praised its scope and its exploration of philosophical dilemmas: "The drama that interests Mr. Clarke is played out on a much larger canvas. It concerns the lures and limitations of knowledge, the destiny of mankind, and the fate of the universe."

Dave Langford reviewed The Songs of Distant Earth for White Dwarf #81, and stated that "Let's face it, Clarke's characters can only manage three emotions: intellectual hunger, sorrow for bygone glories (here a nova-zapped Earth), and awe in the face of the infinite. None is appropriate to a bittersweet love affair; with this vacuum at the book's core, the other bits don't fuse together but just lie there. Pity."

Baird Searles dismissed such trite criticism with his review of the novel in Asimov's Science Fiction Magazine (October 1986), calling the book "hugely enjoyable ... and it would make a sensational movie."

The book climbed to No. 12 on the New York Times best seller listing.
