= Frank Borman =

American astronaut (1928–2023)

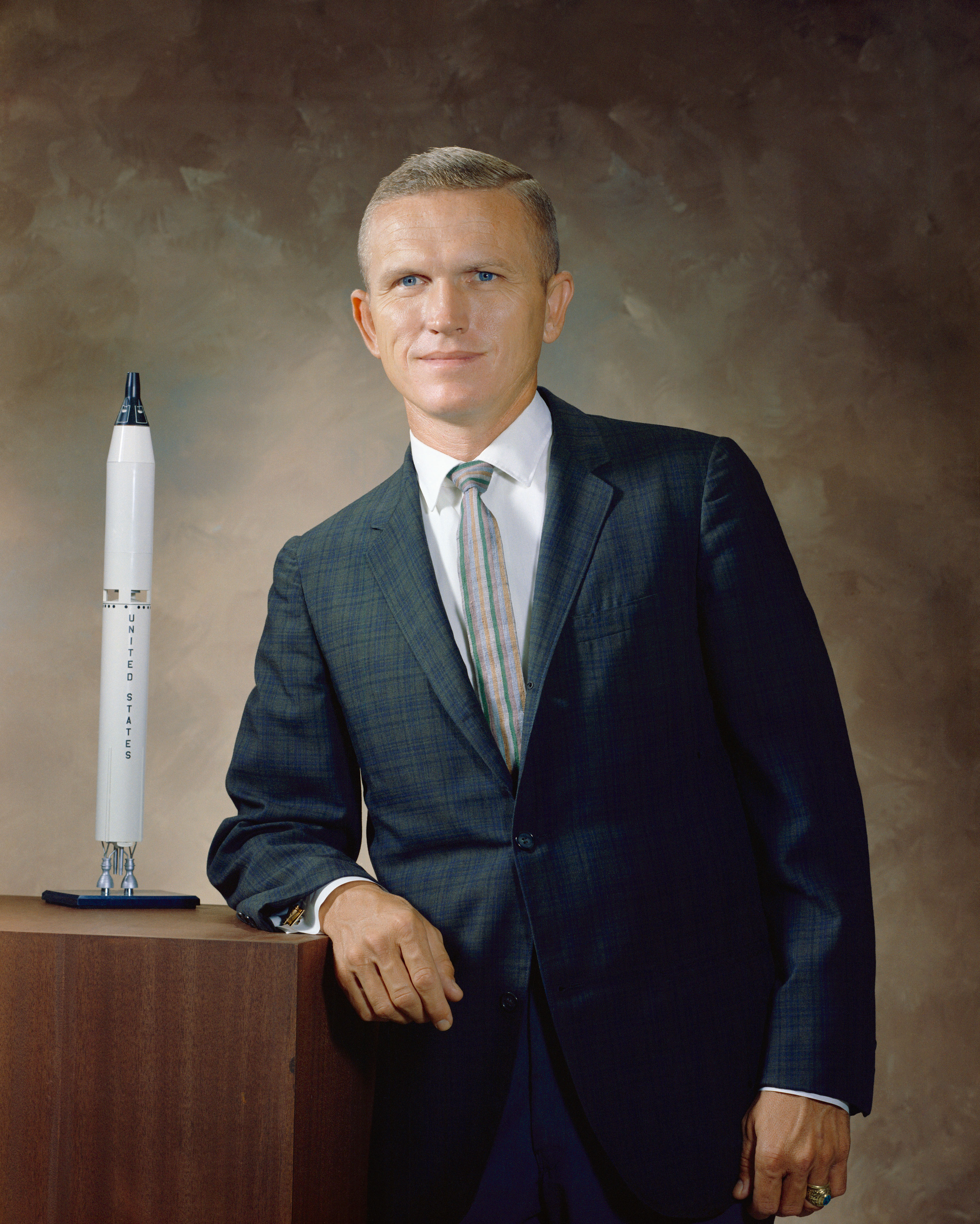
- Borman in 1964
- Born: Frank Frederick Borman II; March 14, 1928; Gary, Indiana, U.S.
- Died: November 7, 2023 (aged 95); Billings, Montana, U.S.
- Resting place: West Point Cemetery
- Education: United States Military Academy (BS); California Institute of Technology (MS)
- Spouse: Susan Bugbee (m. 1950; died 2021)
- Children: 2
- Awards: Distinguished Flying Cross; Air Force Distinguished Service Medal; Legion of Merit; Congressional Space Medal of Honor; NASA Distinguished Service Medal; NASA Exceptional Service Medal
- Space career

NASA astronaut
- Rank: Colonel, USAF
- Time in space: 19d 21h 35m
- Selection: NASA Group 2 (1962)
- Missions: Gemini 7 Apollo 8
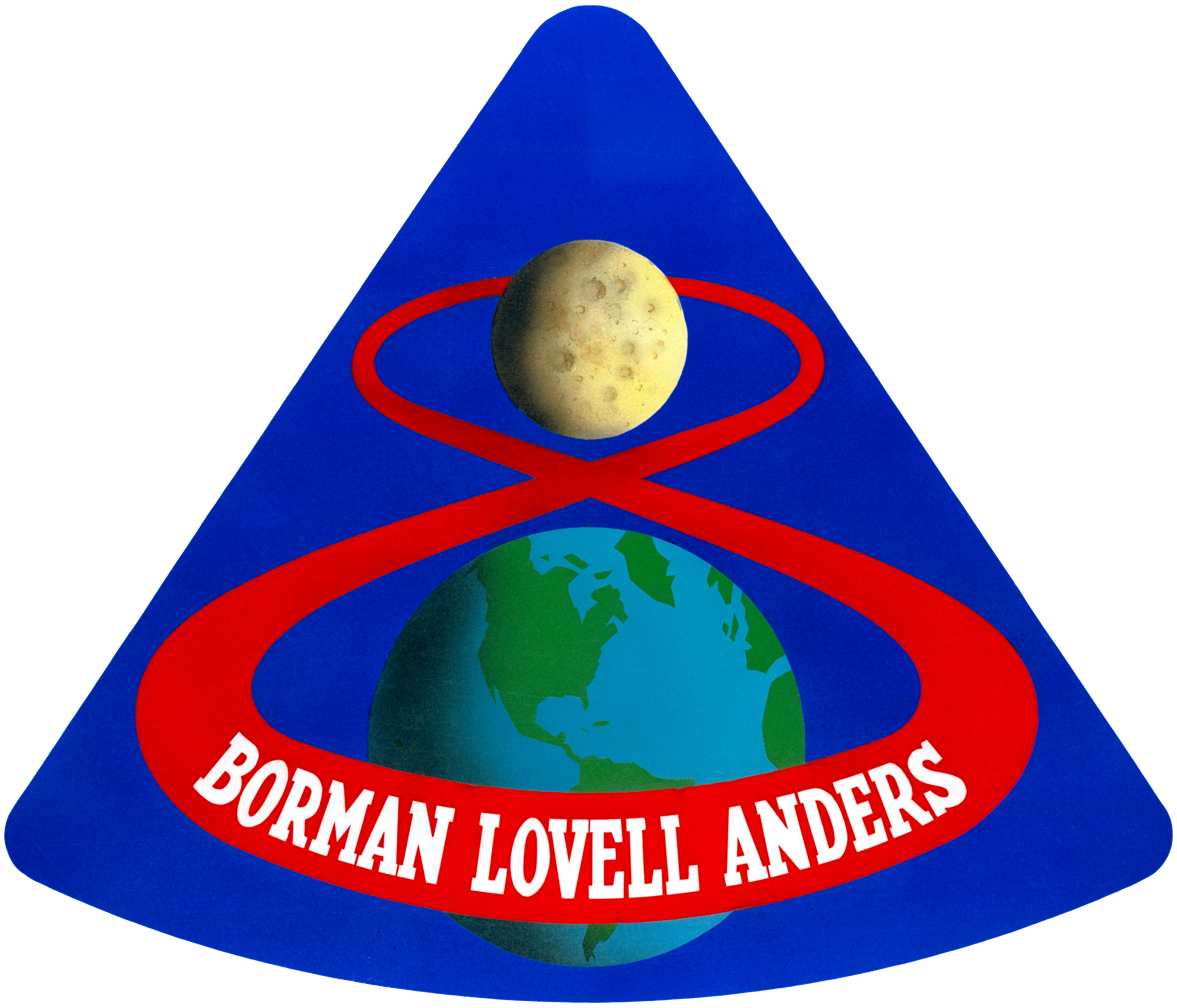
- Mission insignia
- Retired: July 1, 1970

Signature
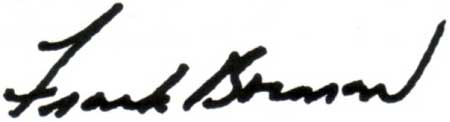

Frank Frederick Borman II (March 14, 1928 – November 7, 2023) was an American United States Air Force (USAF) colonel, aeronautical engineer, NASA astronaut, test pilot, and businessman. He was the commander of Apollo 8, the first mission to fly around the Moon, and together with crewmates Jim Lovell and William Anders, became the first of 28 humans to do so, for which he was awarded the Congressional Space Medal of Honor.

Four days before he graduated with the West Point Class of 1950, in which he was ranked eighth out of 670, Borman was commissioned in the USAF. He qualified as a fighter pilot and served in the Philippines. He earned a Master of Science degree at Caltech in 1957, and then became an assistant professor of thermodynamics and fluid mechanics at West Point. In 1960, he was selected for Class 60-C at the USAF Experimental Flight Test Pilot School at Edwards Air Force Base in California and qualified as a test pilot. On graduation, he was accepted as one of five students in the first class at the Aerospace Research Pilot School.

Borman was selected as a NASA astronaut with the second group, known as the Next Nine, in 1962. In 1966, he set a fourteen-day spaceflight endurance record as commander of Gemini 7. He served on the NASA review board which investigated the Apollo 1 fire, and then flew to the Moon with Apollo 8 in December 1968. The mission is known for the Earthrise photograph taken by Anders of the Earth rising above the lunar horizon as the Command/Service Module orbited the Moon, and for the reading from Genesis, which was televised to Earth from lunar orbit on Christmas Eve. During the Apollo 11 Moon landing mission, he was the NASA liaison at the White House, where he viewed the launch on television with President Richard Nixon.

After retiring from NASA and the Air Force in 1970, Borman became senior vice president for operations at Eastern Air Lines. He became chief executive officer of Eastern in 1975, and chairman of the board in 1976. Under his leadership, Eastern went through the four most profitable years in its history, but airline deregulation and the additional debt that it took on to purchase new aircraft led to pay cuts and layoffs, and ultimately to conflict with unions, resulting in his resignation in 1986. He moved to Las Cruces, New Mexico, where he ran a Ford dealership with his son, Fred. In 1998, they bought a cattle ranch in Bighorn, Montana.

== Early life and education ==
Frank Frederick Borman II was born on March 14, 1928, at 2162 West 11th Avenue in Gary, Indiana, the only child of Edwin Otto Borman, who owned an Oldsmobile car dealership there, and his wife Marjorie Ann Borman (née Pearce), who named him after his paternal grandfather. He was of German descent. His great-grandfather Christopher Borman immigrated from Germany in the late 19th century and worked as a tuba player in a traveling circus. Because he suffered from numerous sinus and mastoid problems in the cold and damp weather, his family moved to the better climate of Tucson, Arizona, which Borman considered his hometown. His father bought a lease on a Mobil service station.

Borman attended Sam Hughes Elementary School in Tucson, where he played soccer and baseball. He then went to Mansfeld Junior High School, where he tried out for the football team. He was not good enough, so he formed his own team with some local boys, sponsored by a local jewelry store. He earned some money with a newspaper route, delivering copies of the Arizona Daily Star.

After Mansfeld, Borman went on to Tucson High School, where he was an honor student. He played quarterback on the junior varsity team, and then became the second-string quarterback on the varsity team. The first-string quarterback broke his arm during the first game, and was out for most of the season. Although every one of the four forward passes he attempted that year was incomplete, the team went on to win the state championship. He also started dating Susan Bugbee, a sophomore at his school.

After the United States entered World War II in 1941, his parents found work at a new Consolidated Vultee aircraft factory in Tucson. His first ride in an airplane had been when he was five years old. He learned to fly at the age of 15, taking lessons with a female instructor, Bobbie Kroll, at Gilpin Field. When he obtained his student pilot certificate, he joined a local flying club. He also built model airplanes out of balsa wood.

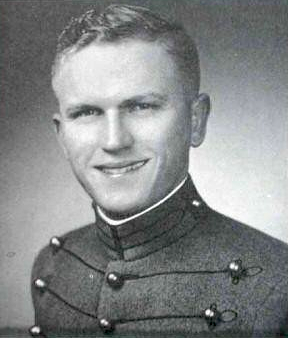
As a West Point cadet

Borman was helping a friend build model planes, when his friend's father asked him about his plans for the future. Borman told him that he wanted to go to college and study aeronautical engineering, but his parents did not have the money to send him to an out-of-state university, and neither the University of Arizona nor Arizona State University offered top-notch courses in aeronautical engineering at that time. His football skills were insufficient to secure an athletic scholarship, and he lacked the political connections to secure an appointment to the United States Military Academy at West Point. He therefore planned to join the Army, which would allow him to qualify for free college tuition under the G.I. Bill.

His friend's father told him that he knew Richard F. Harless, the congressman who represented Arizona. Harless already had a principal nominee for West Point, but Borman's friend's father convinced Harless to list Borman as a third alternative. Borman took the West Point entrance examination, but since his chances of a West Point appointment were slim, he also took the Army physical, and passed both. But the end of the war had changed attitudes towards joining the military, and the three nominees ahead of him all dropped out. Instead of reporting to Fort MacArthur on graduation from high school, he went to West Point.

Borman entered West Point on July 1, 1946, with the Class of 1950. It was a difficult year to enter. Many members of the class were older than he, and had seen active service in World War II. Hazing by the upperclassmen was common. Another challenge was learning how to swim. He tried out for the plebe football team; his skills were insufficient, but head coach Earl Blaik took him on as an assistant manager. In his final year, Borman was a cadet captain, commanding his company, and manager of the varsity football team.

Borman chose to be commissioned as a second lieutenant in the United States Air Force (USAF) on June 2, 1950. Before the United States Air Force Academy was built, the USAF was authorized to accept up to a quarter of each West Point graduating class. So that USAF officers graduating from West Point had equal seniority with those graduating from the United States Naval Academy, the entire class was commissioned four days ahead of their graduation. Borman graduated with a Bachelor of Science degree on June 6, 1950, ranked eighth in his class of 670.

Borman drove back to Tucson with his parents in his brand-new Oldsmobile 88 for the traditional sixty-day furlough after graduation. He had split up with Susan while he was at West Point, but had since reconsidered. She had earned a dental hygiene degree at the University of Pennsylvania, and was planning to commence a liberal arts degree at the University of Arizona. He persuaded her to see him again, and proposed to her. She accepted, and they were married on July 20, 1950, at St. Philip's in the Hills Episcopal Church in Tucson.

== Air Force ==
After a brief honeymoon in Phoenix, Arizona, Borman reported to Perrin Air Force Base in Texas for basic flight training in a North American T-6 Texan in August 1950. The top students in the class had the privilege of choosing which branch of flying they would pursue; Borman elected to become a fighter pilot. He was therefore sent to Williams Air Force Base, near Phoenix, in February 1951 for advanced training, initially in the North American T-28 Trojan, and then the F-80 jet fighter. Fighter pilots were being sent to Korea, where the Korean War had broken out the year before. He asked for, and was assigned to, Luke Air Force Base near Phoenix—Susan was eight months pregnant—but at the last minute his orders were changed to Nellis Air Force Base in Nevada. There, he practiced aerial bombing and gunnery. His first child, a son called Frederick Pearce, was born there in October. Borman received his pilot wings on December 4, 1951.

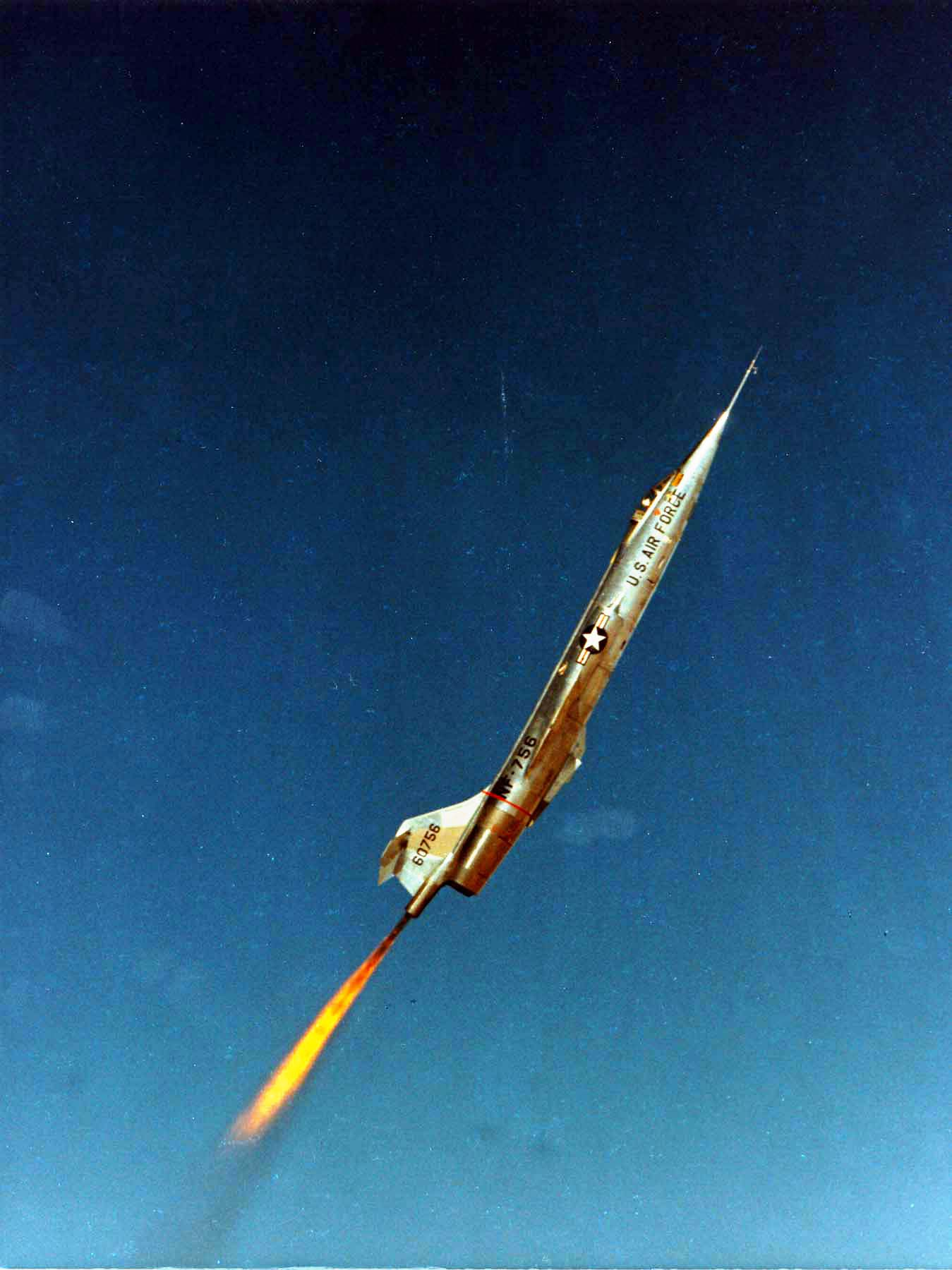
To acquaint Aerospace Research Pilot School students with some of the techniques of space flight, three F-104s were fitted with rocket motors and reaction controls for use beyond the atmosphere.

Soon after, Borman suffered a perforated eardrum while practicing dive bombing with a bad head cold. Instead of going to Korea, he was ordered to report to Camp Stoneman, whence he boarded a troop transport, the USNS Fred C. Ainsworth on December 20, 1951, bound for the Philippines. Susan sold the Oldsmobile to buy air tickets to join him. He was assigned to the 44th Fighter-Bomber Squadron, which was based at Clark Air Base, and commanded by Major Charles McGee, a veteran fighter pilot. Initially, Borman was restricted to non-flying duties due to his eardrum; although it had healed, the base doctors feared it would rupture again if he flew. He persuaded McGee to take him for flights in a T-6, and then a Lockheed T-33, the trainer version of the Shooting Star. This convinced the doctors, and Borman's flight status was restored on September 22, 1952. His second son, Edwin Sloan, was born at Clark in July 1952.

Borman returned to the United States, where he became a jet instrument flight instructor at Moody Air Force Base in Georgia, mainly in the T-33. In 1955, he secured a transfer to Luke Air Force Base. Most of his flying was in F-80s, F-84s, swept-wing F-84Fs and T-33s. In 1956, he received orders to join the faculty at West Point, after first completing a master's degree in aeronautical engineering. Not wanting to spend two years qualifying for a non-flying posting that could last for another three years, he searched for a master's degree course that took only one year, and settled on the one at the California Institute of Technology. He received his Master of Science degree in aeronautical engineering in June 1957, and then became an assistant professor of thermodynamics and fluid mechanics at West Point, where he served until 1960. He found he enjoyed teaching, and was still able to fly a T-33 from Stewart Air Force Base on weekends. One summer he also attended the USAF Survival School at Stead Air Force Base in Nevada.

In June 1960, Borman was selected for Class 60-C at the USAF Experimental Flight Test Pilot School at Edwards Air Force Base in California, and became a test pilot. His class, which included Michael Collins and James B. Irwin, who also later became astronauts, graduated on April 21, 1961. Thomas P. Stafford, another future astronaut, was one of the instructors. On graduation, Borman was accepted as one of five students in the first class at the Aerospace Research Pilot School, a postgraduate school for test pilots to prepare them to become astronauts. Fellow members of the class included future astronaut Jim McDivitt. Classes included a course on orbital mechanics at the University of Michigan, and there were zero-G flights in modified Boeing KC-135 Stratotanker and Convair C-131 Samaritan aircraft. Borman began training with the Lockheed F-104 Starfighter. It would be flown up to 70,000 feet (21,000 m), where the engine would cut out for lack of oxygen, and then coast up to 90,000 feet (27,000 m). This would be followed by a powerless descent, and restarting the engine on the way down. A pressure suit was required.

On April 18, 1962, NASA formally announced that it was accepting applications for a new group of astronauts who would assist the Mercury Seven astronauts selected in 1959 with Project Mercury, and join them in flying Project Gemini missions. The USAF conducted its own internal selection process, and submitted the names of eleven candidates. It ran them through a brief training course in May 1962 on how to speak and conduct themselves during the NASA selection process. The candidates called it a "charm school". Borman's selection as one of the Next Nine was publicly announced on September 17, 1962. Chuck Yeager, the commandant of the USAF Test Pilot School at Edwards, told him: "you can kiss your godamned Air Force career goodbye." During his Air Force service, Borman logged 3,600 hours of flying time, of which 3,000 was in jet aircraft.

== NASA ==
Borman moved with his family to Houston, Texas, where the Manned Spacecraft Center (MSC) was still being established, and signed his first home construction contract, for $26,500 (equivalent to $282,000 in 2025). Following the precedent set by the Mercury Seven, each of the Nine was assigned a special area in which to develop expertise that could be shared with the others, and to provide astronaut input to the designers and engineers. Borman's assignment was the Titan II booster used by Project Gemini, although he had no experience in that area. The assignment involved many trips to the Martin Marietta plants in Denver, Colorado, and Baltimore, Maryland, where the Titan IIs were built. His responsibility included the Emergency Detection System (EDS) developed for an abort situation. Borman agreed with Wernher von Braun that reliance would have to be placed on automated systems in situations where human reaction time would not be fast enough. This was much to the consternation of old hands like Warren J. North, the NASA Chief of the Flight Crew Support Division, who did not accept the notion that an automated system was superior to the skill of a human being.

There was also classroom work. Initially, each of the astronauts was given four months of classroom instruction on subjects such as spacecraft propulsion, orbital mechanics, astronomy, computing, and space medicine. There was also familiarization with the Gemini spacecraft, Titan II and Atlas boosters, and the Agena target vehicle. Jungle survival training was conducted at the USAF Tropic Survival School at Albrook Air Force Station in Panama, desert survival training at Stead Air Force Base in Nevada, and water survival training on the Dilbert Dunker at the Naval Air Station Pensacola in Florida and on Galveston Bay. There were fifty hours of instruction in geology, with field trips to the Grand Canyon and Meteor Crater in Arizona. Borman thought it was a waste of time. "I didn't care about picking up rocks," he later told an interviewer, "I wanted to beat the Soviets to the Moon".

=== Project Gemini ===
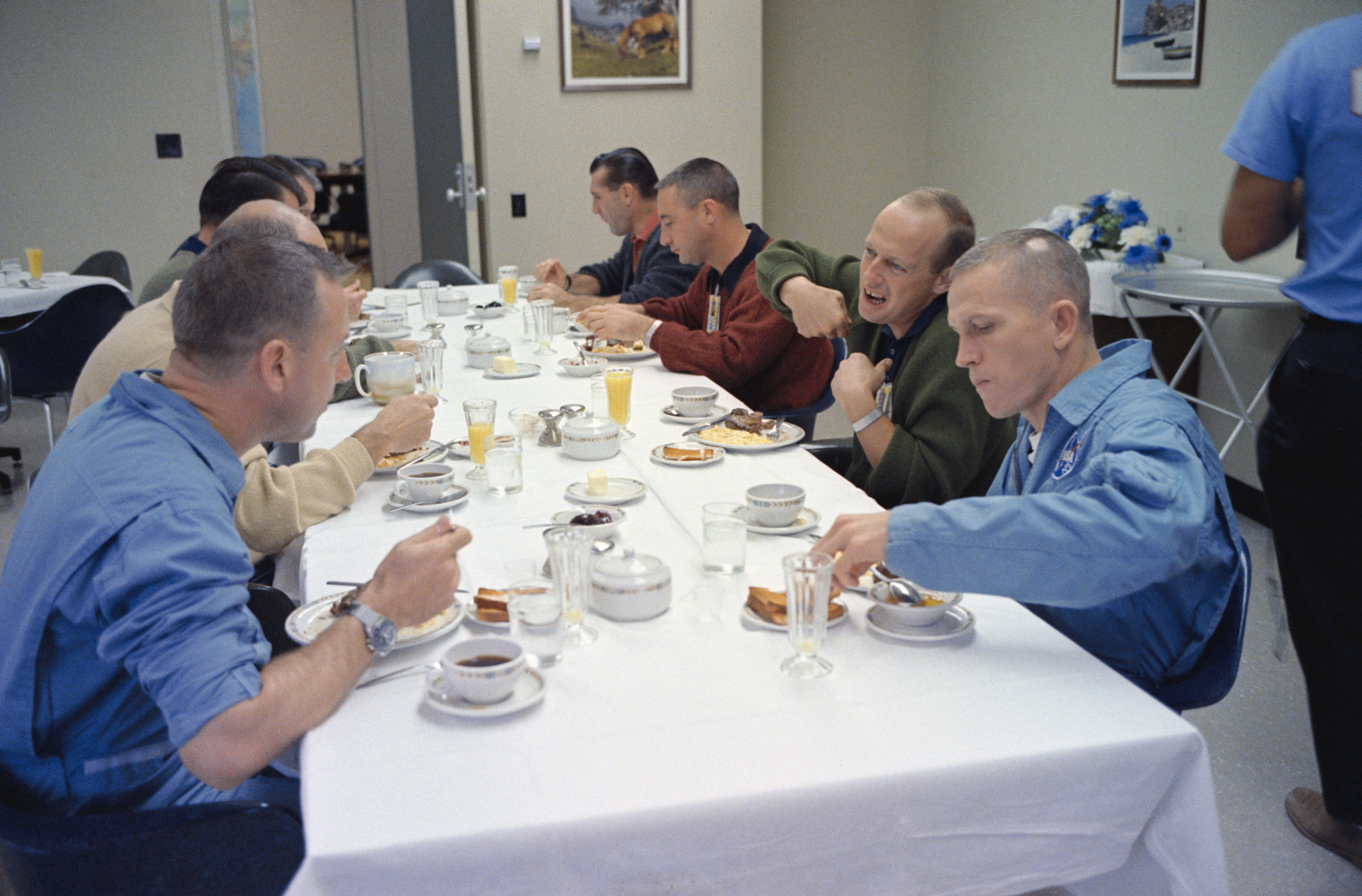
Borman (right) is joined for breakfast before the Gemini 7 mission by fellow astronauts

When the Chief of the Flight Crew Operations, Mercury Seven astronaut Deke Slayton, drew up a tentative schedule of Project Gemini flights, he assigned Mercury Seven astronaut Alan Shepard command of the first crewed flight, Gemini 3, with Next Nine astronaut Tom Stafford as his co-pilot. Mercury Seven astronaut Gus Grissom would command the backup crew, with Borman as his co-pilot. Under the crew rotation system Slayton devised, the backup crew of one mission would become the prime of the third mission after. Borman would therefore become the co-pilot of Gemini 6, which was planned as a long-duration fourteen-day mission.

An Apollo mission to the Moon was expected to take at least a week, so one of the objectives of Project Gemini was to test the ability of the crew and spacecraft components to operate in space for that length of time. When Shepard was grounded in October 1963, Grissom and Borman became the prime crew of Gemini 3. Grissom invited Borman to his house to talk to him about the mission, and after a long discussion, decided that he could not work with Borman. According to Gene Cernan, "the egos of Grissom and Borman were too big to fit into a single spacecraft". Slayton therefore replaced Borman with John Young.

Slayton still wanted Borman for the two-week flight, which had now slipped to Gemini 7, so Borman was assigned as backup commander of Gemini 4, with Jim Lovell as his co-pilot. This was officially announced on July 27, 1964, and their assignment to Gemini 7 followed on July 1, 1965, with Ed White and Michael Collins as their backups. Borman was one of four members of his group chosen to command their first missions, the others being McDivitt, Neil Armstrong, and Elliot See, although See was killed in a jet crash three months before his mission. Prime and backup crews trained for the mission together, and Borman found the experience as a backup valuable, amounting to a dress rehearsal of their own mission.

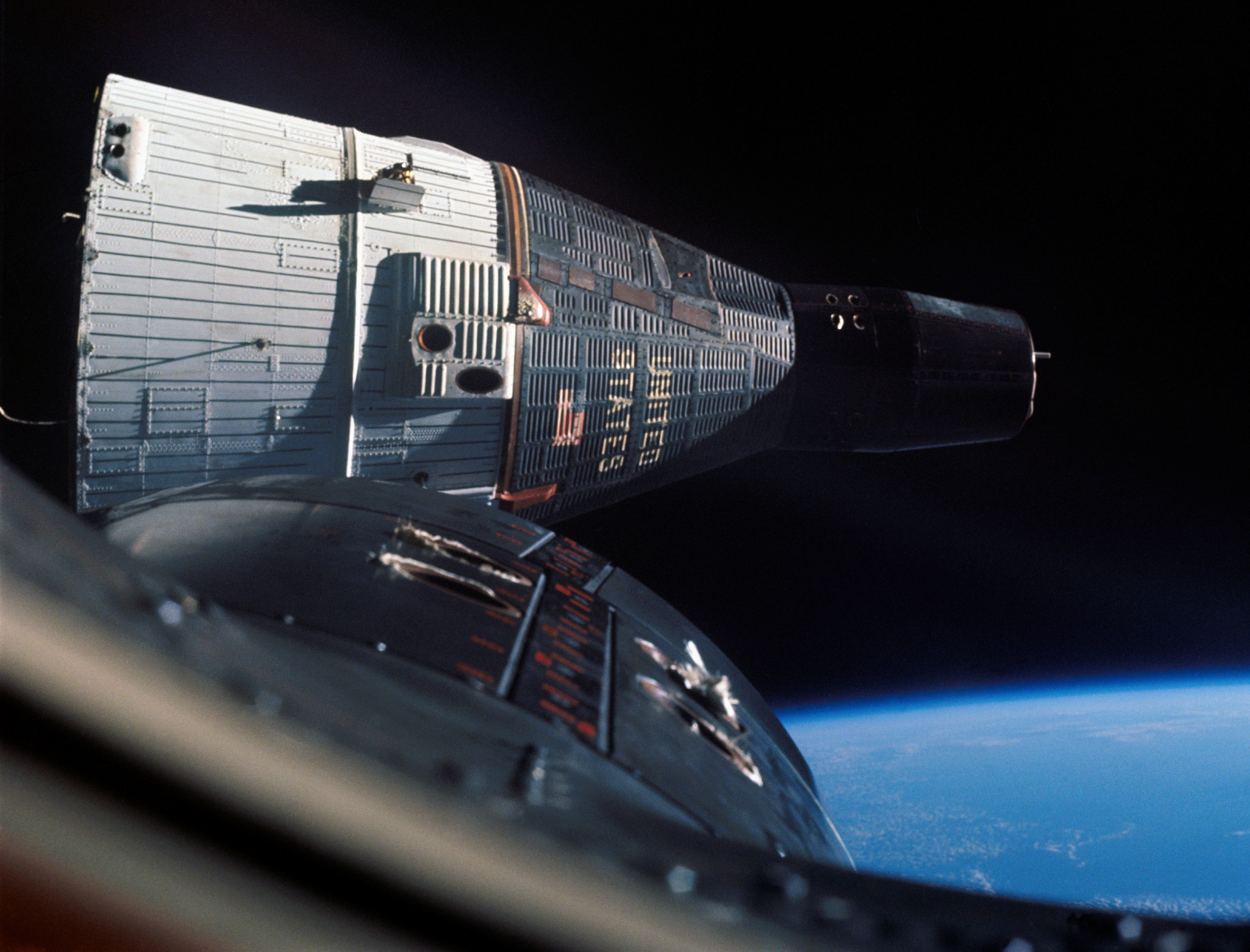
Gemini 7, as seen from Gemini 6

That Gemini 7 would last for fourteen days was known from the beginning, and gave Borman time to prepare. To keep fit, he and Lovell jogged 2 to 3 miles (3 to 5 km) a day, and played handball after work. They visited the McDonnell Aircraft plant in St. Louis, Missouri, where their spacecraft was built. At 8,076 pounds (3,663 kg), it was 250 pounds (110 kg) heavier than any previous Gemini spacecraft. Special procedures were developed for the stowage of consumables and garbage. A lightweight space suit was developed to make the astronauts more comfortable.

A major change affecting the mission occurred when the Agena target vehicle for Gemini 6 suffered a catastrophic failure. This mission was intended to practice orbital rendezvous, a requirement of Project Apollo and therefore an objective of Project Gemini. Borman was at the Kennedy Space Center (KSC) to observe the launch of Gemini 6, and heard two McDonnell officials, spacecraft chief Walter Burke and his deputy, John Yardley, discuss the possibility of using Gemini 7 as a rendezvous target. Borman rejected the idea of docking the two spacecraft, but otherwise thought the idea had merit.

After some discussion about how it could be accomplished, it was approved. The 6555th Aerospace Test Wing dismantled Gemini 6 and assembled Gemini 7 at Cape Canaveral Air Force Station Launch Complex 19. Gemini 7 was launched at 14:30 local time on December 6, 1965. Then the race was on to launch Gemini 6 with Wally Schirra and Tom Stafford on board, which was accomplished at 08:37 local time on December 15. Gemini 6 completed the rendezvous with Gemini 7 at 14:33. The two craft came within 12 inches (30 cm) of each other. At one point Schirra held up a sign in the window for Borman to read that said: "Beat Army". Schirra, Stafford and Lovell were all United States Naval Academy graduates; Borman was outnumbered.

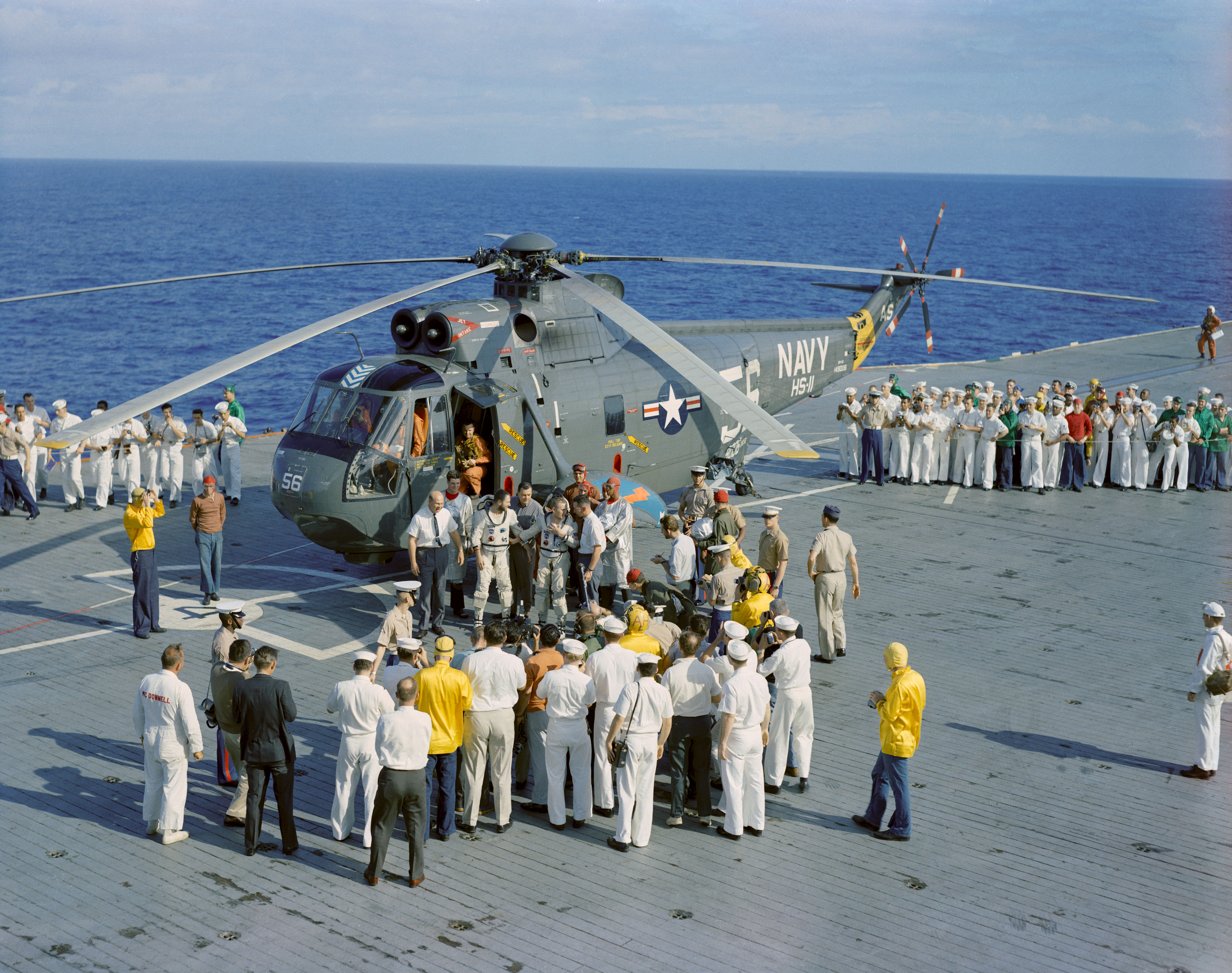
Borman and Lovell arrive on the recovery vessel, the aircraft carrier USS Wasp

When Schirra and Stafford pulled away and returned to Earth, Borman and Lovell still had three days to go, in a space the size of the front seat of a small car. Borman began hoping that something would go wrong and excuse an early return. Finally, on December 18, it was time to return. The two astronauts were pumped up with the help of the stimulant dexedrine. The re-entry was accomplished flawlessly, and the Gemini 7 spacecraft splashed down 6.4 miles (10.3 km) from the recovery vessel, the aircraft carrier USS Wasp. Borman had never been on an aircraft carrier before, and was awed by its size. Borman was awarded the NASA Exceptional Service Medal for this mission, and was promoted to colonel. At 37, he was the youngest full colonel in the Air Force.

=== Project Apollo ===
==== Apollo 1 ====
In planning for Project Apollo, Slayton designated new crews under the command of the experienced astronauts who commanded the early Gemini missions. On missions with a lunar module, the senior pilot (later known as the command module pilot) would also be an experienced astronaut, as he would have to fly the command module solo. Borman was given the assignment of backup for the second mission, an Earth-orbital mission without a lunar module. He would then command the fourth, a medium Earth orbit mission with a lunar module. He was given Charles Bassett for a senior pilot and Bill Anders as the pilot (later known as the lunar module pilot); Bassett was expected to fly on Gemini 9, but he died in the air crash that also killed See. Borman was then given Stafford as senior pilot and Collins as pilot. Subsequently, Stafford was given his own crew, and Anders was reassigned to Borman's crew. As Collins had spaceflight experience on Gemini 10, he became the senior pilot. The second mission was scrubbed, but Borman's remained unchanged, although now it was to be the third mission, and he had no backup responsibility. The crew selection was officially announced in a NASA press release on December 22, 1966.

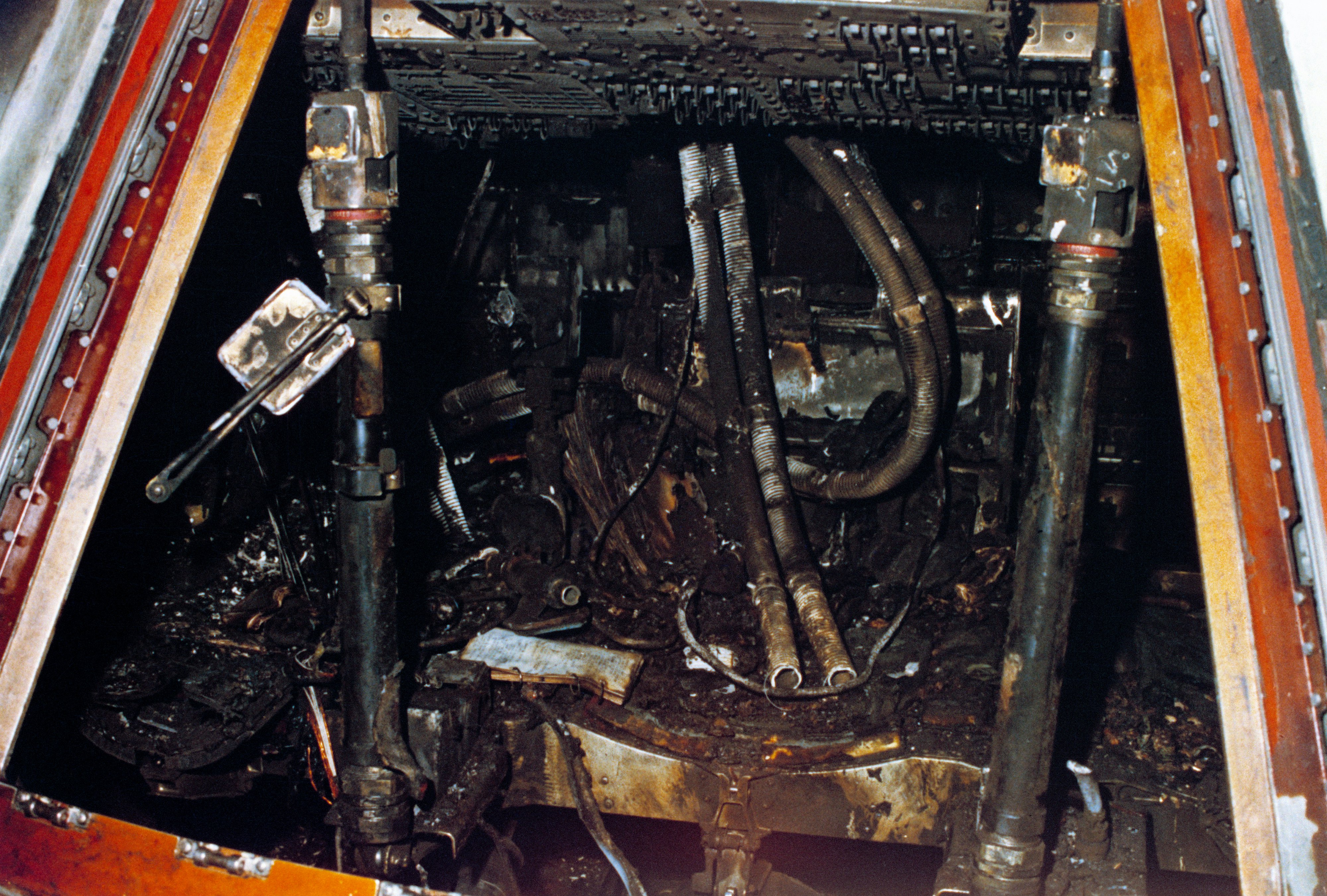
The charred remains of the Apollo 1 cabin interior

On January 27, 1967, the crew members of the first crewed Apollo mission (Apollo 1 — then designated AS-204), Gus Grissom, Ed White, and Roger B. Chaffee, were killed in a fire aboard their command module. Following this deadly accident, the AS-204 Accident Review Board was charged with investigating the root causes of the fire and recommending corrective measures. Borman was chosen as the only astronaut to serve on the nine-member review board. He inspected the burnt-out command module and verified the positions of the switches and circuit breakers. In April 1967, while serving on the board, Borman was one of five astronauts who testified before the United States House of Representatives and United States Senate committees investigating the Apollo 1 fire (the others were Shepard, Schirra, Slayton and McDivitt). Borman faced tough and sometimes hostile questioning. Borman's testimony helped convince Congress that Apollo would be safe to fly again. He told them: "We are trying to tell you that we are confident in our management, and in our engineering and in ourselves. I think the question is really: Are you confident in us?"

In the aftermath of the disaster, Joe Shea resigned as manager of the Apollo project. Robert Gilruth, the director of the MSC, offered the position to Borman, who turned it down. The job was given to Gilruth's deputy, George Low; Borman accepted a temporary posting to the North American Aviation plant in Downey, California, where the command modules were made, to oversee the implementation of the recommendations of the AS-204 Accident Review Board. Borman was forced to confront one of the root causes of the disaster: the natural tension between getting the job done on time and building the spacecraft as well as possible.

Borman argued with test pilot Scott Crossfield, who was in charge of safety engineering at North American, over the design of an effective emergency oxygen system. Borman refused to accept the design because it did not protect the crew from noxious fumes. Crossfield then opposed the delivery of North American's S-II, the second stage of the Saturn V Moon rocket, which Crossfield deemed unsafe. Borman informed management at North American that he could not work with Crossfield, and Crossfield eventually left the company. A redesigned hatch that allowed the astronauts to exit within seconds instead of minutes added 1,500 pounds (680 kg) to the weight of the spacecraft. The parachutes had to be redesigned to ensure they could hold the additional weight, and re-testing them cost $250,000. This led to a clash with George Mueller, who thought the cost was excessive.

==== Apollo 8 ====
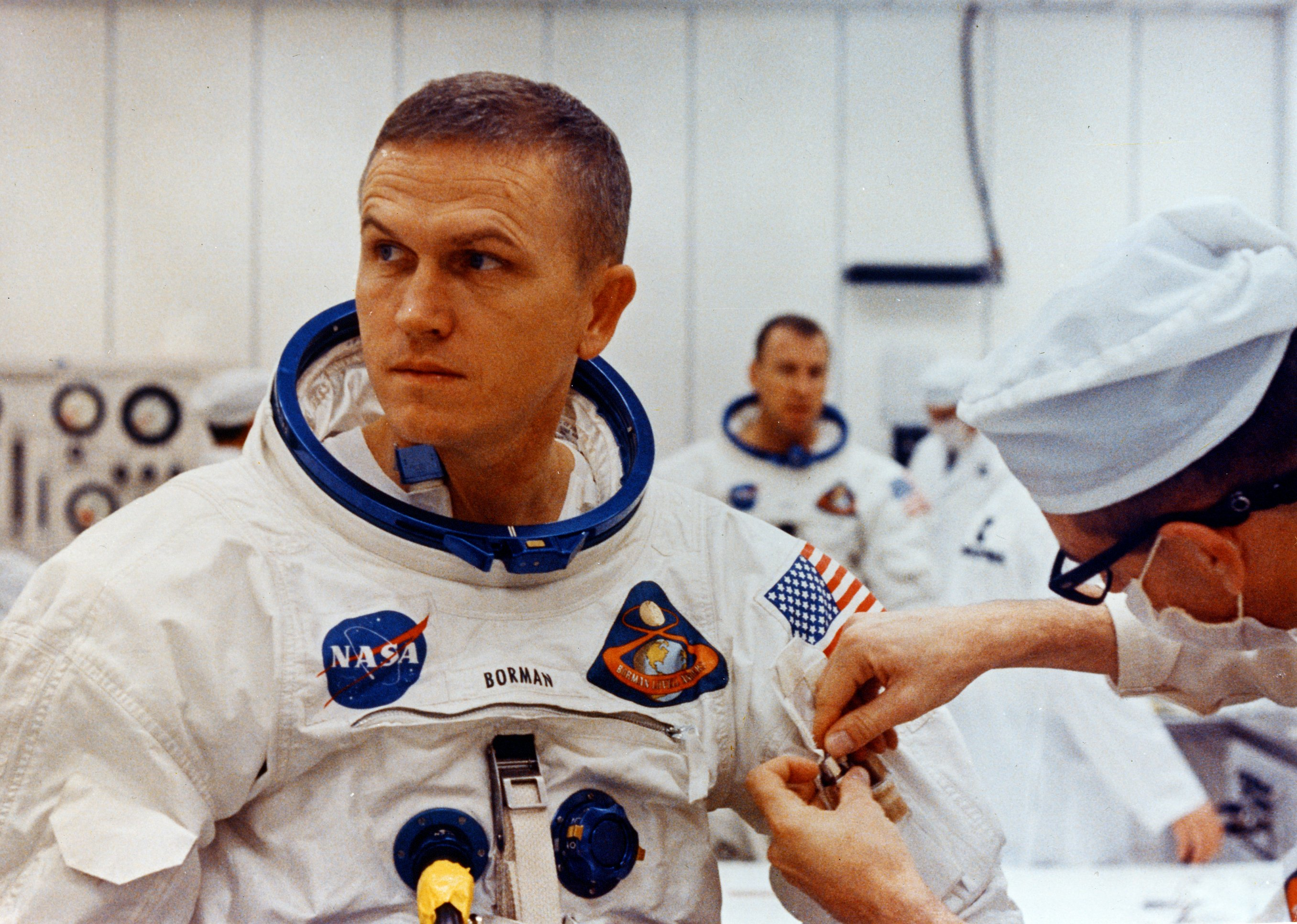
Borman prepares for Apollo 8 on launch day.

Borman's medium Earth orbit lunar module test mission was now planned as Apollo 9, and tentatively scheduled for early 1969, after a low Earth orbit one commanded by McDivitt in December 1968. The crew assignments were officially announced on November 20, 1967, but in July 1968 Collins suffered a cervical disc herniation that required surgery to repair. He was replaced by Lovell in July 1968, reuniting Borman with his Gemini 7 crewmate. When Apollo 8's LM-3 arrived at the KSC in June 1968, more than a hundred significant defects were discovered, leading Gilruth to conclude that there was no prospect of LM-3 being ready to fly in 1968.

In August 1968, in response to a report from the CIA that the Soviet Union were considering a lunar fly-by before the end of the year, George Low proposed a bold solution to keep the Apollo program on track. Since the next Command/Service Module (CSM) (designated as "CSM-103") would be ready three months before LM-3, a CSM-only mission could be flown in December 1968. Instead of repeating the flight of Apollo 7, it could be sent to the Moon, entering lunar orbit before returning to Earth. This also meant that the medium Earth orbit mission could be dispensed with, keeping to the schedule for a lunar landing in mid-1969. With the change in mission for Apollo 8, Slayton asked McDivitt if he still wanted to fly it. McDivitt turned it down; his crew had spent a great deal of time preparing to test the LM, and that was what he still wanted to do. When Borman was asked the same question, he answered "yes" without any hesitation. Slayton then decided to swap the crews and spacecraft of the Apollo 8 and 9 missions.

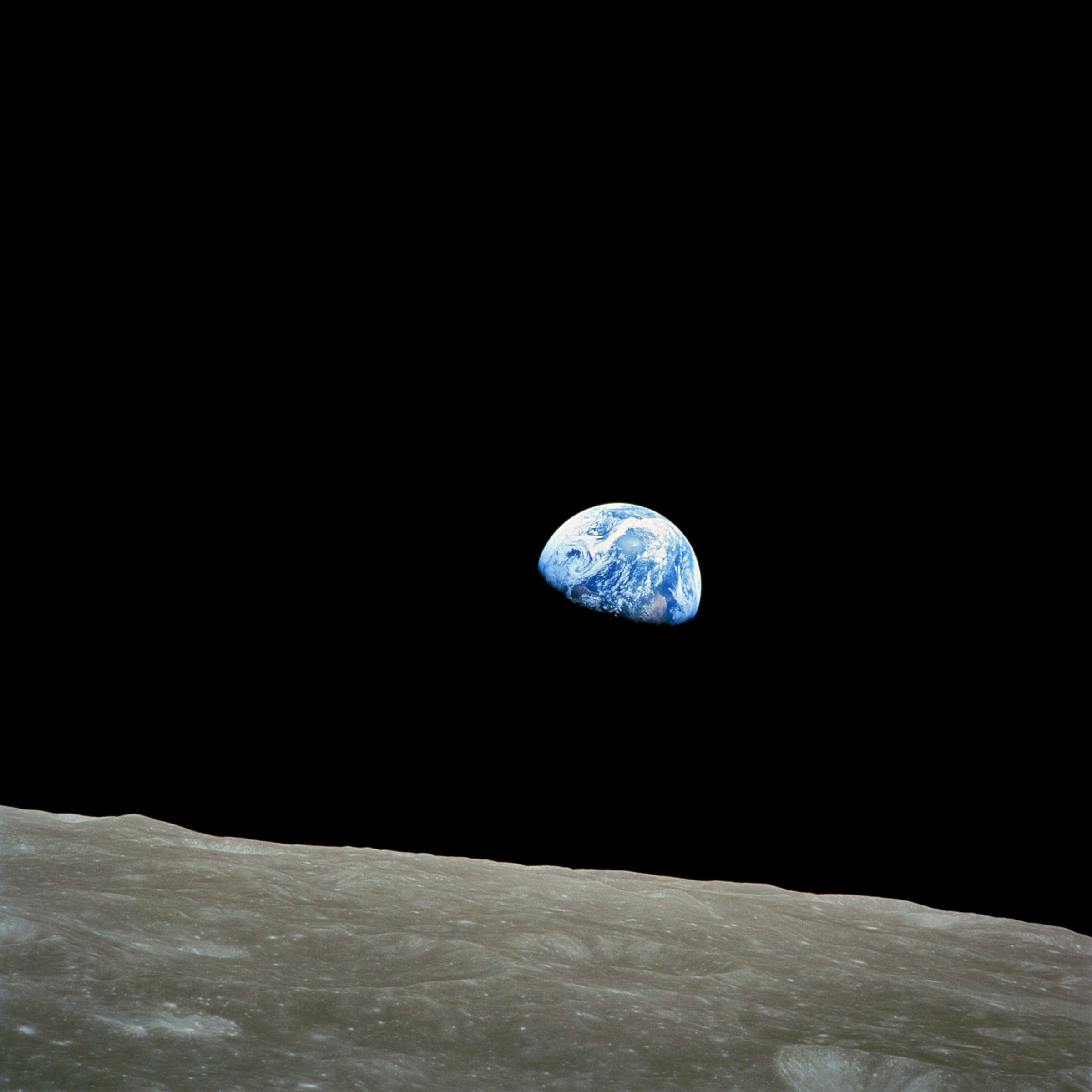
Earthrise, taken on December 24, 1968, by Apollo 8 astronaut Bill Anders

Apollo 8 was launched at 12:51:00 UTC (07:51:00 Eastern Standard Time) on December 21, 1968. On the second day Borman awoke feeling ill. He vomited twice and had a bout of diarrhea; this left the spacecraft full of small globules of vomit and feces, which the crew cleaned up as best they could. Borman did not want anyone to know about his medical problems, but Lovell and Anders wanted to inform Mission Control. The Apollo 8 crew and Mission Control medical personnel concluded that there was little to worry about and that Borman's illness was either a 24-hour flu, as Borman thought, or an adverse reaction to a sleeping pill. Researchers now believe that he was suffering from space adaptation syndrome, which affects about a third of astronauts during their first day in space as their vestibular system adapts to weightlessness. Space adaptation syndrome had not occurred on Mercury and Gemini missions because those astronauts could not move freely in the small cabins of those spacecraft. The increased cabin space in the Apollo command module afforded astronauts greater freedom of movement, contributing to symptoms of space sickness.

The Apollo 8 1968 Christmas Eve broadcast and reading from the Book of Genesis

On December 24, Apollo 8 went into lunar orbit. The crew made ten orbits of the Moon in twenty hours before returning to Earth. The mission is known for the Earthrise photograph taken by Bill Anders of the Earth rising above the lunar horizon as the command module orbited the Moon, and for the televised reading from Genesis in lunar orbit, released for worldwide broadcast. About six weeks before the launch, NASA's deputy director for public affairs, Julian Scheer, had told Borman that a television broadcast was scheduled for this time, and suggested that they find something appropriate to say. Borman had consulted with Simon Bourgin, who worked at the United States Information Agency, and had accompanied Borman and Lovell on a goodwill tour of the Far East after the Gemini 7 mission. Bourgin, in turn, consulted Joe Laitin, a former United Press International reporter, who suggested that the Apollo 8 crew read from the Book of Genesis after his wife Christine had come up with the idea. The text was transcribed onto fireproof paper for the broadcast. "One of the things that was truly historic", Borman later joked, "was that we got that good Catholic Bill Anders to read from the King James Version of the bible."

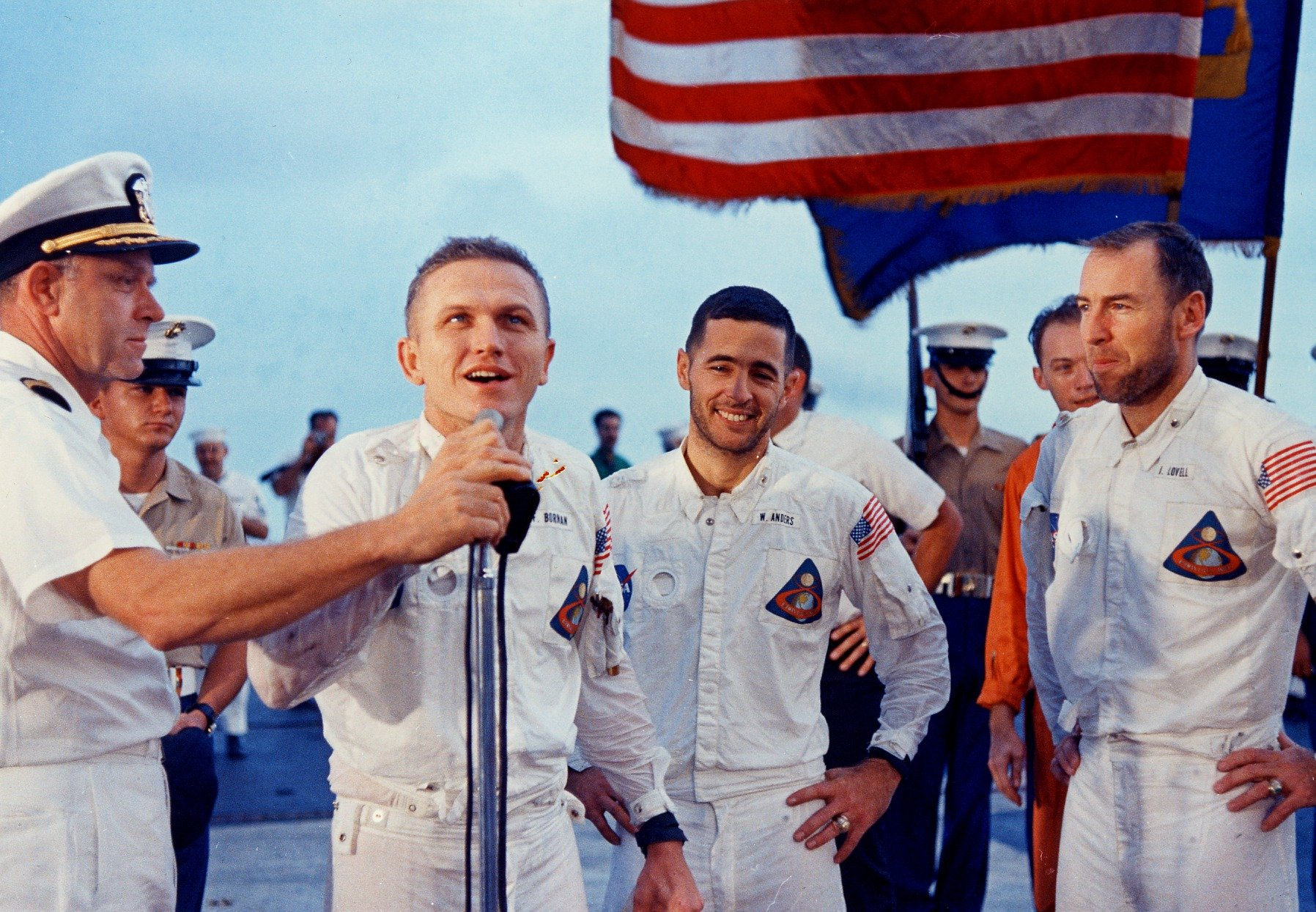
Borman addresses the crew of the USS Yorktown after a successful splashdown and recovery.

The Apollo 8 spacecraft splashed down in darkness at 10:51:42 UTC (05:51:42 EST) on Friday, December 27. Borman had argued for this; a daylight landing would have required orbiting the Moon at least twelve times, and Borman did not think this was necessary. When the spacecraft hit the water, Borman did not flick the switch to release the parachutes quickly enough. They dragged the spacecraft over and left it upside down. In this position, the flashing light beacon could not be seen by the recovery helicopters. Borman inflated the bags in the nose of the spacecraft, which then righted itself. Mission ground rules required a daylight recovery, so the crew had to wait 45 minutes until local sunrise before the frogmen could open the hatches. Borman became seasick and threw up, and was glad when he could be taken on board the recovery ship, the aircraft carrier USS Yorktown.

Apollo 8 came at the end of 1968, a year that had seen much upheaval in the United States and most of the world. They were the first human beings to orbit another celestial body, having survived a mission that even the crew themselves had rated as having only a fifty-fifty chance of fully succeeding. The effect of Apollo 8 was summed up in a telegram from a stranger, received by Borman after the mission, that stated simply, "Thank you Apollo 8. You saved 1968."

The crew were accorded ticker tape parades in New York, Chicago and Washington, D.C., where they were awarded the NASA Distinguished Service Medal, which was presented by President Lyndon B. Johnson. Borman was also awarded the Air Force Distinguished Service Medal. Afterward, Borman was sent on a goodwill tour of Europe, with a secondary objective of finding out more about the space programs of other NATO countries. He was accompanied by Bourgin and Nicholas Ruwe, the assistant chief of protocol at the State Department. Borman met with Queen Elizabeth II, Prince Philip and a teenage Princess Anne at Buckingham Palace in the UK, with President Charles de Gaulle in France, Pope Paul VI in Rome, and King Baudouin and Queen Fabiola of Belgium.

==== Apollo 11 ====
Space journalist Andrew Chaikin claims that, following the death of Gus Grissom, Borman became Slayton's choice to command the first Moon landing attempt. In the fall of 1968, Slayton offered command of the first landing to Borman, who turned it down. Long before Apollo 8 lifted off, Borman had decided that it would be his last flight, and that he would retire in 1970. After twenty years' service in the Air Force, he would qualify for a pension. Borman told an interviewer in 1999 that "my reason for joining NASA was to participate in the Apollo Program, the lunar program, and hopefully beat the Russians. I never looked at it for any individual goals. I never wanted to be the first person on the Moon and frankly, as far as I was concerned, when Apollo 11 was over the mission was over. The rest was frosting on the cake."

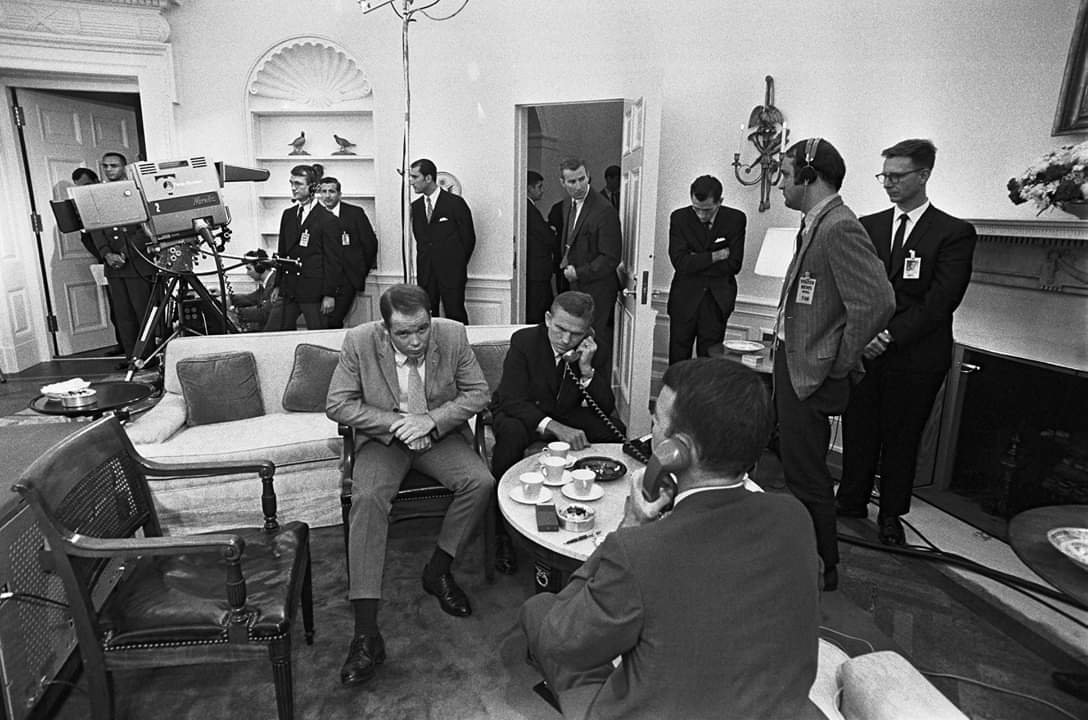
Borman (center) in the Oval Office during Nixon's call to the Apollo 11 astronauts on the Moon

For the Apollo 11 Moon landing mission in July 1969, Borman was assigned as NASA liaison to President Richard Nixon at the White House. He viewed the launch from the President's office. Nixon initially had prepared a long speech to read to the astronauts on the Moon during a phone call, but Borman persuaded him to keep his words brief and non-partisan. He also convinced the President to omit the playing of the "Star Spangled Banner", which would have required the astronauts to waste two and a half minutes of their time on the surface standing still. He accompanied the President in Marine One, when it flew to the recovery ship, the aircraft carrier USS Hornet to meet the crew of Apollo 11 on their return.

==== Other military activities ====
In June 1970, Borman retired from NASA and the U.S. Air Force as a colonel. He later cited family stress as a major reason for leaving the astronaut corps, in particular his wife's alcohol dependency. For his services as an astronaut, the Air Force awarded him the Distinguished Flying Cross and the Legion of Merit.

In August 1970, he undertook another special presidential mission, a worldwide tour to seek support for the release of American prisoners of war held by North Vietnam. At the conclusion of his 25-day mission to 25 countries, Borman briefed Nixon on September 1 at the Western White House in San Clemente, California. While the mission was not an abject failure, his fame failed to compensate for his lack of political experience and gravitas. On September 22, he appeared before an unusual joint meeting of Congress conducted at the request of the National League of Families of American Prisoners and Missing in Southeast Asia in his capacity as presidential envoy. He noted that the POWs were being treated poorly, and urged Congress "not to forsake your countrymen who have given so much for you."

Borman performed one more assignment for the military. In 1976, there was a major cheating scandal at West Point. Faculty noticed remarkably similar answers to an examination paper for Electrical Engineering 304, a required course, that had been given to over 800 cadets to complete on their own. Cheating was a violation of the Cadet Honor Code, and cheaters were subject to expulsion. Cadets were tried by 12-member honor boards of cadets that functioned as grand juries; but the system was prone to abuse, and those cleared on appeal to the five‐member appeal boards of officers that functioned as courts were often punished with "silence", a form of shunning. Borman was appointed to head a special commission to investigate and report to the Secretary of the Army. Eventually, 92 cadets were readmitted, and graduated with the Class of 1978; more than 60 others declined the offer of amnesty, and chose to complete their education elsewhere.

Borman's son Frederick, of the West Point Class of 1974, was accused of taking a bribe. It was alleged that while a member of a cadet honor code board he had accepted a $1,200 payment to fix a case involving two cadets accused of cheating. Frederick was cleared of all charges after taking a polygraph test. Borman's younger son, Edwin, of the West Point Class of 1975, was also accused of improprieties, but there was no evidence to support the allegations, and they were dismissed.

== Eastern Air Lines ==
In early 1969, Borman became a special advisor to Eastern Air Lines. The following year he completed Harvard Business School's six-week Advanced Management Program. He joined Eastern Air Lines on July 1, 1970, and moved to Miami. In December he became its senior vice president for operations. On the evening of December 29, 1972, Borman received a phone call informing him that Eastern Air Lines Flight 401 had disappeared off the radar near Florida's Everglades. He took a helicopter, which was able to land in the darkness 150 yards (140 m) from the crash site, and waded waist-deep through the murky swamp, helping rescue crash victims and load survivors into rescue helicopters.

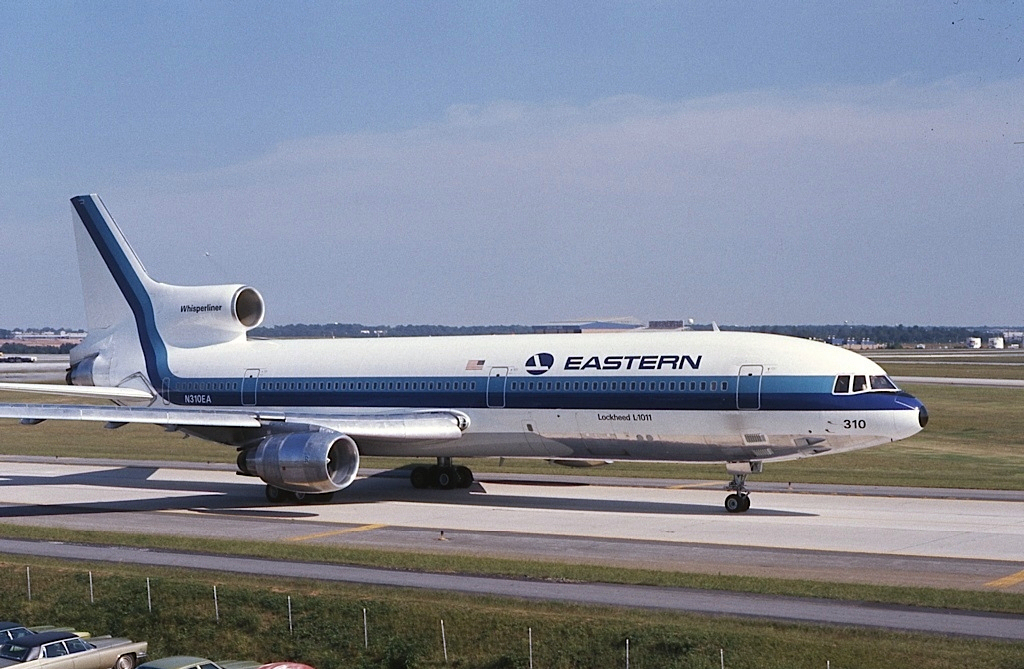
Eastern Air Lines Lockheed L-1011 TriStar N310EA (193A-1011), which crashed in the Florida Everglades on December 29, 1972

The accident put the spotlight on the airline's Lockheed L-1011 TriStar aircraft, which suffered from maintenance problems, particularly with the turbine blades of the Rolls-Royce RB211 engine. This made it difficult to fly them at a profit. The airline also had 25 Boeing 727-100QC aircraft capable of being quickly changed from passenger to cargo aircraft. These weighed more than the airline's standard 727-100s, and therefore consumed more fuel, which made them only marginally profitable when fuel prices were low, but jet fuel prices quadrupled in the 1970s. Eastern also spent $200,000 on a down payment for two Concordes, although it had no suitable routes to fly them on.

Borman was promoted to executive vice president-general operations manager and was elected to Eastern's board of directors in July 1974. In May 1975, he was elected president and chief operating officer by the board. He was named chief executive officer of Eastern in December 1975, and became chairman of the board in December 1976. Borman disliked aspects of American corporate culture, such as plush offices, luxury Cadillac and Mercedes company cars and a Lockheed JetStar corporate jet for executives, while firing or furloughing employees. After he became Eastern's CEO, he saved the company $9 million annually in salaries by firing 81 middle managers and 31 vice presidents. He drove to work in a second-hand Chevrolet Camaro with an engine he rebuilt himself. He sold the JetStar, and, as at North American, banned drinking on company time, which he considered also included lunchtime. The end of the three-martini lunch came as a shock to many executives.

Eastern had not turned a profit since 1969. To reduce costs, Borman convinced employees to accept a wage freeze in 1976, with an eight percent raise in 1977, and then a five-year Variable Earnings Program (VEP). Under the VEP, employees contributed 3.5 percent of their annual salaries to a special profit insurance fund. If Eastern did not achieve a two percent return on each revenue dollar, the fund was used to make up the difference. If the company did earn more than two percent, the excess money was returned to the employees, who could earn back up to twice their contributions. To get his changes through, Borman visited the airline's facilities in 28 states to bring his proposals to his employees.

With the VEP in hand, Borman was able to refinance the debt on the company's 254 aircraft. Profits jumped to a record $67.3 million in 1978. During this time, the employees received double their VEP payments. Borman ordered $1.4 billion worth of new, more fuel-efficient aircraft, and the company's debt ballooned to $2.3 billion. But 1979 was the last profitable year until 1985. In the intervening five years, Eastern ran at a loss, accumulating $380 million in losses. The company's debt-to-equity ratio stood at 8:1, and servicing the debt required $235 million annually in interest payments, representing about 6 1/2 cents in every dollar earned.

The cause of the decline in profitability was only partly due to the company's debt; there was also airline deregulation in 1978, which caused the number of airlines in the United States to increase from 30 to nearly 100. Some of the newcomers offered unprofitable and unsustainable low prices to gain market share. In just the first three-quarters of 1984, Eastern lost $128 million. Borman negotiated an agreement with the Air Line Pilots Association (ALPA) for a 22 percent pay cut, while the International Association of Machinists (IAM) and the Transport Workers Union (TWU) (representing the flight attendants) accepted an 18 percent cut. Employees were nominally compensated with grants of company stock, but its value declined from $60 a share in 1966 to $6 a share in 1983.

Eastern posted a profit of $6.3 million on gross revenues of $4 billion in 1984, but this was not enough to satisfy the creditors, who demanded a two percent profit. Borman laid off 1,000 flight attendants and cut the pay of 6,000 more by over 20 percent. He also slashed the pay of executives and middle managers by 20 to 25 percent. In the first quarter of 1985, earnings were up to $24.3 million, 35 cents a share, after setting aside $28.9 million for the employees. It was the third consecutive profitable quarter in a row. Borman attempted to negotiate further cuts with the unions, threatening bankruptcy. The ALPA and TWU accepted, but the IAM did not. Over ten years, the three unions had given up $836 million in wages and benefits, and the company had little to show for it. Charlie Bryan, the head of the IAM, said that the union would accept the deal only if Borman resigned. In response, Eastern's board decided to sell the airline to Texas Air Corporation, headed by Frank Lorenzo. Borman resigned from Eastern in June 1986. It was a personal defeat, but hardly a personal financial disaster; he received a severance payment of $900,000, and drew a consultant's fee of $150,000 a year from it until 1991.

Borman served on the South African Board of Inquiry into the 1986 aircraft crash that killed Mozambican president Samora Machel.

== Retirement ==
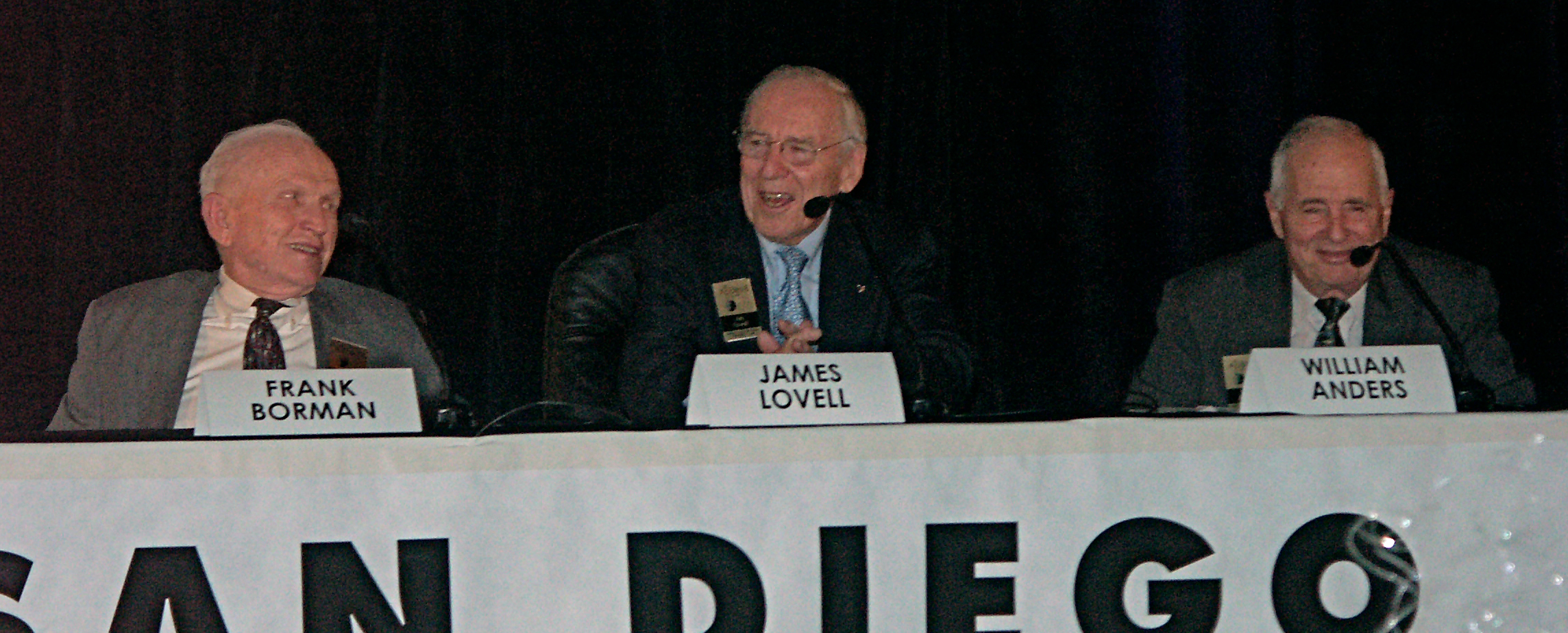
Borman with Jim Lovell and Bill Anders at an Apollo 8 40th anniversary event in San Diego in December 2008

Borman and Susan left Miami, and moved to Las Cruces, New Mexico. For a time, he was the majority owner of a Las Cruces Ford dealership founded by his son, Fred. He was a member of the boards of directors of Home Depot, National Geographic, Outboard Marine Corporation, Automotive Financial Group, Thermo Instrument Systems and American Superconductor. He was CEO of Patlex Corporation, a small company that held patents in lasers, from July 1988 to August 1996. That year, he published an autobiography, Countdown, co-written with Robert J. Serling.

In 1998, Borman purchased a cattle ranch in the Bighorn Mountains of southern Montana, running 4,000 head of cattle on 160,000 acres (65,000 ha). In addition to tending cattle, Borman continued his hobbies in rebuilding and modeling aircraft. Notably, he owned and painstakingly rebuilt a very rare World War II single-engine fighter, the Bell P-63 Kingcobra. It won the prestigious Grand Champion Warbird award when Borman exhibited it at Oshkosh in 1998. He also personally flew it in airshows. He was a member of the Society of Antique Modelers (SAM). In 1998, he moved to Billings, Montana. His wife Susan suffered from Alzheimer's disease, and he spent much of his time caring for her. Eventually she was placed in a nursing home, where he visited her each day, until her death on September 7, 2021.

Following John Glenn's death in December 2016, Borman became the oldest living American astronaut. He was eleven days older than his Apollo 8 crewmate, Jim Lovell. Both celebrated their 90th birthdays in March 2018. Borman gave the commencement address to the University of Arizona's 2008 graduating class, and was reunited with Lovell and Anders for celebrations of the 50th anniversary of Apollo 8 in December 2018 at the Museum of Science and Industry in Chicago, where the spacecraft in which they orbited the Moon is on display. "I have never said it before publicly", declared Borman, "but these two talented guys, I'm just proud that I was able to fly with them. It was a tough job done in four months, and we did a good job."

Borman died from a stroke at the Billings Clinic on November 7, 2023, at the age of 95. He was remembered by some in Billings as a "man (who) cared about people." He was interred at West Point Cemetery.

== Character, views, civic involvement ==
Borman was once described by a NASA psychiatrist as the least complicated man he had ever met. In his business career he was described as autocratic. He had a Tolstoy quotation on a wall in his office: "The only legitimate happiness is honest hard work and the surmounting of obstacles."

Borman was a member of the Non-Group, a civically influential group of Miami-Dade business leaders.

== Awards and honors ==
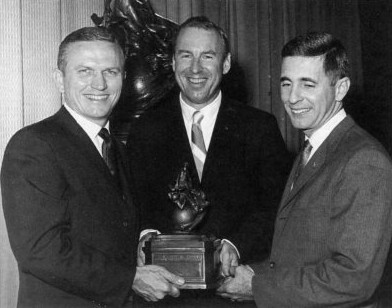
Apollo 8 crew holding replica Collier Trophy

Borman, along with his Gemini 7 crewmate Lovell and the Gemini 6 crew, received the 1965 Harmon Trophy. He and Lovell were awarded the trophy a second time for the Apollo 8 mission in 1968. The Apollo 8 crew was also awarded the Robert J. Collier Trophy for "achievement in astronautics". Former deputy administrator of NASA and then Secretary of the Air Force Robert Seamans Jr. awarded them the General Thomas D. White USAF Space Trophy at the National Geographic Society, and Vice President Spiro Agnew presented them with the society's Hubbard Medal. Time magazine chose the crew of Apollo 8 as its Men of the Year for 1968, recognizing them as the people who most influenced events in the year, and they were featured on the January 3, 1969, cover. Jim Lovell accepted the Dr. Robert H. Goddard Memorial Trophy for space achievement from President Richard Nixon on behalf of the Apollo 8 crew. On October 1, 1978, Borman was awarded the Congressional Space Medal of Honor for his command of Apollo 8.

Borman, who built model airplanes throughout much of his life, was awarded the Academy of Model Aeronautics Distinguished Service Award in 1968. Borman, along with other recipients such as baseball player Mickey Mantle and actress Polly Bergen, was awarded the Golden Plate Award of the American Academy of Achievement in 1969. Borman received the honor for the science and exploration category. He was also awarded the Society of Experimental Test Pilots James H. Doolittle Award in 1976, the Tony Jannus Award in 1986, the Airport Operators Council International Downes Award in 1990, and the NASA Ambassador of Exploration Award in 2012. He was awarded honorary doctorates from Whittier College, the University of Arizona, South Dakota School of Mines, Illinois Wesleyan University, the University of Pittsburgh, Indiana University, Arizona State University, Clarkson University, Hope College, and the Air University.

Borman was one of ten Gemini astronauts inducted into the International Space Hall of Fame in 1982. He and Senator Barry Goldwater were two of four individuals inducted into the National Aviation Hall of Fame in 1982. In 1990, Borman was selected for the Arizona Aviation Hall of Fame's inaugural class. He was among the second class that was inducted into the U.S. Astronaut Hall of Fame in 1993. He was also inducted into the International Air & Space Hall of Fame in 1990 and the DeMolay International Hall of Fame.

== In media ==
In From the Earth to the Moon, a 1998 HBO miniseries, Borman was played by David Andrews. He was interviewed in the 2008 Discovery Channel documentary When We Left Earth: The NASA Missions, and appeared in the 2005 documentary Race to the Moon, which was shown as part of the PBS American Experience series. The film centered on the events that led up to the Apollo 8 mission. On November 13, 2008, Borman, Lovell and Anders appeared on the NASA TV channel to discuss Apollo 8 on the 40th anniversary of the mission. Borman was featured on Episode 655 of the radio program This American Life titled "The Not-So-Great Unknown", airing on August 24, 2018; his interview with David Kestenbaum in Act One of the episode titled "So Over the Moon" centered on his unconventional outlook towards space travel. Borman's face was used on the cover of Led Zeppelin's second album.

== Tributes ==
- I-80/I-94 in Lake County, Indiana, which runs through his birth town of Gary, Indiana, is named the Frank Borman Expressway.
- A K–8 school on Davis-Monthan Air Force Base in Tucson, Arizona, is named in Borman's honor.
- A school in Phoenix, Arizona, is named Frank Borman Junior High School.
- A school in Denton, Texas, is named Borman Elementary School.
- A park in Gary, Indiana, is named Borman Square Park.

== Notes ==
Preceded by Floyd D. Hall	Chief executive of Eastern Airlines; 1975–1986	Succeeded by Phil Bakes
Preceded by John Glenn	Oldest living American astronaut 2016–2023	Succeeded by Jim Lovell
