= Hibernaculum (song) =

Single by Mike Oldfield

from the album The Songs of Distant Earth
- Released: 5 December 1994
- Recorded: Roughwood Studio, Buckinghamshire
- Genre: Ambient
- Length: 3:32
- Label: Warner Music UK
- Songwriter: Mike Oldfield
- Producer: Mike Oldfield

Mike Oldfield singles chronology
"In Dulci Jubilo" (1993)	"Hibernaculum" (1994)	"Let There Be Light" (1995)

CD single 2

"Hibernaculum" is a song by musician Mike Oldfield, released on his 1994 album The Songs of Distant Earth. It charted at number 47 in the UK Singles Chart.

Two different versions of the single were released. The first contained several remixes of "Moonshine", the final part of Tubular Bells II, while the other contain unreleased material, including "The Song of the Boat Men", which would later be reused in another song called "Moonshine" on Oldfield's 2014 rock album, Man on the Rocks.

== Track listing ==
=== UK CD 1 ===
1. "Hibernaculum" – 3:32
2. "Moonshine" (Festive Mix) – 3:41
3. "Moonshine" (Solution Hoedown Mix) – 5:27
4. "Moonshine" (Jungle Mix) (Featuring Rankin' Sean & Peter Lee) – 4:16

=== UK CD 2 ===
1. "Hibernaculum" – 3:32
2. "The Spectral Army" – 2:41
3. "The Song of the Boat Men" – 2:52

== Charts ==
=== Weekly charts ===
Chart (1994)	Peak position
Iceland (Íslenski Listinn Topp 40)	8
Israel (Israeli Singles Chart)	20
UK Singles (Official Charts)	47

=== Year-end charts ===
Chart (1994)	Position
Iceland (Íslenski Listinn Topp 40)	84
