= Alexander Kosovichev =

Russian-American astrophysicist

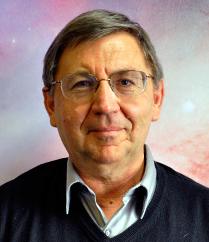
- Born: Alexander Georgievich Kosovichev; July 3, 1953 (age 73); Ishim, Tyumen Oblast, Russian Federation
- Education: Novosibirsk University; Moscow University; St. Petersburg University
- Awards: Wempe Prize in Astrophysics (2005)
- Scientific career
- Fields: Physics, astrophysics, solar physics
- Workplaces: Crimean Astrophysical Observatory
- Title: Distinguished Professor, Director of the Center for Computational Heliophysics (NJIT)

Academic work
- Institutions: Crimean Astrophysical Observatory, University of Cambridge, Stanford University, New Jersey Institute of Technology (NJIT)
- Main interests: Solar observations and theory, helioseismology, astrophysics, numerical simulations
- Website: Official website

Alexander Georgievich Kosovichev (born July 3, 1953) is a Russian astrophysicist, scientist, researcher, and academic. Kosovichev is distinguished professor of physics at the New Jersey Institute of Technology (NJIT), and has been the director of its Center for Computational Heliophysics since 2014. He is known for his work on solar observations, helioseismology, astrophysics, and numerical simulations. Kosovichev was awarded the 2005 Johann Wempe Prize in Astrophysics "for his outstanding achievements in the field of helioseismology." He was elected a Fellow of the American Geophysicist Union in 2014. Kosovichev was the president of the International Astronomical Union's Commission 12.

== Early life and education ==
Kosovichev was born on July 3, 1953 in the town of Ishim, part of the Tyumen Oblast, in the Russian Federation. He graduated with a Master of Science (M.S.) degree in physics from Novosibirsk State University in 1975. After completing his studies there, he began his doctoral work in the field of solar physics at Moscow State University, where he got his Ph.D. in applied mathematics in 1980. He later got his Doctor of Science (D.Sc.) in astrophysics from Saint Petersburg State University in 1989, while working at the Crimean Astrophysical Observatory.

== Career ==
From 1980 to 1990, he worked on foundational research in helioseismology at the Astrophysical Observatory in Crimea. Kosovichev also had visiting positions, between 1984 and 1986, at the Nicolaus Copernicus Astronomical Center, Warsaw. He then moved to the University of Cambridge, where he conducted research for four years (1990–1994). He joined Stanford University as a senior research scientist in 1994, where he worked at the W. W. Hansen Experimental Physics Laboratory. He remained at the Hansen Lab until 2013. He has been the director of the Center for Computational Heliophysics at NJIT since 2014, and he served as the director of Big Bear Solar Observatory (2013–2014). In 2021 he was named a distinguished professor.

=== Contributions ===
One of his contributions is the development of techniques of to analyze solar oscillations to infer properties of the solar interior. This has allowed scientists to better understand phenomena such as solar flares, sunspots, and the solar magnetic field. Kosovichev is known for his work in the fields of solar physics and helioseismology, through research and development of innovative methods. Between 1975 and 1980, he collaborated with V.S. Sokolov, Yu.P. Popov, M.A. Livshitz and M.M. Katsova to develop theories of hydrodynamic and magnetohydrodynamic processes in solar and stellar flares, advancing understanding of flare optical emissions and plasma flows. From 1980, his work on helioseismology studied the Sun's internal structure and dynamics. As a leader in the Solar and Heliospheric Observatory (SOHO) mission, he developed solar acoustic tomography, achieving the first three-dimensional images of solar interior structures. In 1998, he made a significant discovery when he identified sunquakes—seismic waves on the Sun's surface triggered by solar flares. This phenomenon is analogous to earthquakes on Earth and has helped scientists better understand the energy release mechanisms during solar flares. Later, as science lead for the Helioseismic and Magnetic Imager project on NASA’s Solar Dynamics Observatory (SDO), he uncovered critical findings on solar dynamics and activity cycles. Since joining NJIT in 2013, his work has been focusing on solar research through the establishment of the Center for Computational Helio-physics and his participation in major projects like Kepler, IRIS, SDO, and DKIST.

== Prizes and honors ==
In 2005, Kosovichev was awarded the Johann Wempe Prize in Astrophysics.

In 2014, Kosovichev was elected a Fellow of the American Geophysical Union.

The minor planet 8339 Kosovichia is named in his honor. (Note: Asteroid 8339 discovered in 1985 by N.S. Chernykh (from the Crimean Astro-physical Observatory) was named Kosovichia.)

== Selected publications ==
- Scherrer, Philip Hanby, Jesper Schou, R. I. Bush, A. G. Kosovichev, R. S. Bogart, J. T. Hoeksema, Y. Liu et al. "The helioseismic and magnetic imager (HMI) investigation for the solar dynamics observatory (SDO)." Solar Physics 275 (2012): 207-227.
- Zhao, Junwei, and Alexander G. Kosovichev. "Torsional oscillation, meridional flows, and vorticity inferred in the upper convection zone of the Sun by time-distance helioseismology." The Astrophysical Journal 603, no. 2 (2004): 776.
- Kosovichev, A. G., T. L. Duvall, and P. H. Scherrer. "Time-distance inversion methods and results (Invited review)." Helioseismic Diagnostics of Solar Convection and Activity (2001): 159-176.
- Zhao, Junwei, Alexander G. Kosovichev, and Thomas L. Duvall Jr. "Investigation of mass flows beneath a sunspot by time-distance helioseismology." The Astrophysical Journal 557, no. 1 (2001): 384.
- Schou, J., H. M. Antia, S. Basu, R. S. Bogart, R. I. Bush, S. M. Chitre, J. Christensen-Dalsgaard et al. "Helioseismic studies of differential rotation in the solar envelope by the solar oscillations investigation using the Michelson Doppler Imager." The Astrophysical Journal 505, no. 1 (1998): 390.
- Kosovichev, A. G., and V. V. Zharkova. "X-ray flare sparks quake inside Sun." Nature 393, no. 6683 (1998): 317-318.
- Kosovichev, AGc-authors, J. Schou, P. H. Scherrer, R. S. Bogart, R. I. Bush, J. T. Hoeksema, J. Aloise et al. "Structure and rotation of the solar interior: initial results from the MDI medium-l program." The first results from SOHO (1997): 43-61.
- Thompson, M. J., J. Toomre, E. R. Anderson, H. M. Antia, G. Berthomieu, D. Burtonclay, S. M. Chitre et al. "Differential rotation and dynamics of the solar interior." Science 272, no. 5266 (1996): 1300-1305.
- Gough, D. O., A. G. Kosovichev, J. Toomre, E. Anderson, H. M. Antia, S. Basu, B. Chaboyer et al. "The seismic structure of the Sun." Science 272, no. 5266 (1996): 1296-1300.
- Scherrer, P. H., R. S. Bogart, R. I. Bush, JTc-A. Hoeksema, A. G. Kosovichev, J. Schou, W. Rosenberg et al. "The solar oscillations investigation—Michelson Doppler imager." The soho mission (1995): 129-188.
