= Apollo 8 Genesis reading =

Reading of the Book of Genesis by Apollo 8 crewmembers

The Apollo 8 1968 Christmas Eve broadcast and reading from the Book of Genesis

The Apollo 8 Genesis reading (audio)

On Christmas Eve, December 24, 1968, the crew of Apollo 8, the first humans to orbit the Moon, read from the Hebrew Bible’s Book of Genesis during a television broadcast. During their ninth orbit of the Moon astronauts Bill Anders, Jim Lovell, and Frank Borman recited verses 1 through 10 of the Genesis creation narrative from the King James Bible. Anders read verses 1–4, Lovell verses 5–8, and Borman read verses 9 and 10.

== Broadcast ==
Around the world, television sets glowed with the broadcast. One in four people on Earth—roughly a billion people spread among 64 countries—listened to the reading. Within 24 hours, recorded broadcasts of the address from the moon reached people in another 30 countries. Audiences in North and South America as well as Europe tuned in live thanks to the recently launched Intelsat 3 satellite. COMSAT put the satellite into operation a week ahead of schedule so that international audiences could follow the flight.

— Teasel Muir-Harmony, How Apollo 8 Delivered Christmas Eve Peace and Understanding to the World

== Drafting, and Christine Laitin's suggestion to read from Genesis ==
Apollo 8 commander Frank Borman felt that his initial attempts to draft something appropriate to say on their Christmas Eve broadcast sounded too much like apology for the United States involvement in the Vietnam War, and Joseph Laitin of the Bureau of the Budget (now the Office of Management and Budget) was brought in to assist. Laitin had the same problem; his initial drafts centered on the concept of peace on Earth, which felt inappropriate in light of the ongoing war effort. He began looking through the New Testament to find a good connection between the Christmas season and the Christian biblical accounts of the birth of Jesus.

The suggestion to instead look to the Hebrew Bible (Tanakh) and use the beginning of Genesis came from Christine Laitin, Joseph Laitin's wife who, as a young teenager, was a member of the French Resistance during the occupation of Paris in World War II.

The Genesis text was printed on fire-proof paper and included in the mission flight plan.

== Transcript ==
Bill Anders
We are now approaching lunar sunrise, and for all the people back on Earth, the crew of Apollo 8 has a message that we would like to send to you.

In the beginning God created the heaven and the earth.
And the earth was without form, and void; and darkness was upon the face of the deep. And the Spirit of God moved upon the face of the waters.
And God said, Let there be light: and there was light.
And God saw the light, that it was good: and God divided the light from the darkness.

Jim Lovell

And God called the light Day, and the darkness he called Night. And the evening and the morning were the first day.
And God said, Let there be a firmament in the midst of the waters, and let it divide the waters from the waters.
And God made the firmament, and divided the waters which were under the firmament from the waters which were above the firmament: and it was so.
And God called the firmament Heaven. And the evening and the morning were the second day.

Frank Borman

And God said, Let the waters under the heaven be gathered together unto one place, and let the dry land appear: and it was so.
And God called the dry land Earth; and the gathering together of the waters called he Seas: and God saw that it was good.

And from the crew of Apollo 8, we close with good night, good luck, a Merry Christmas – and God bless all of you, all of you on the good Earth.

== Artifacts ==
The page of the flight plan with the Genesis passage is on display at the Adler Planetarium in Chicago, on loan from Lovell. In 2018 it was displayed in the National Cathedral in Washington, DC for the fiftieth anniversary of the flight.

== Lawsuit ==
Madalyn Murray O'Hair, founder of American Atheists, responded by suing the United States government, alleging violations of the First Amendment. The suit was filed in the United States District Court for the Western District of Texas. It was submitted to a three-judge panel, which concluded that the case was not a three-judge matter, and dismissed the case for failure to state a cause of action. The direct appeal to the Supreme Court was dismissed for lack of jurisdiction. Another appeal was heard before the Fifth Circuit Court of Appeals, which affirmed the trial court's dismissal per curiam. The Supreme Court declined to review the case.

== In popular culture ==
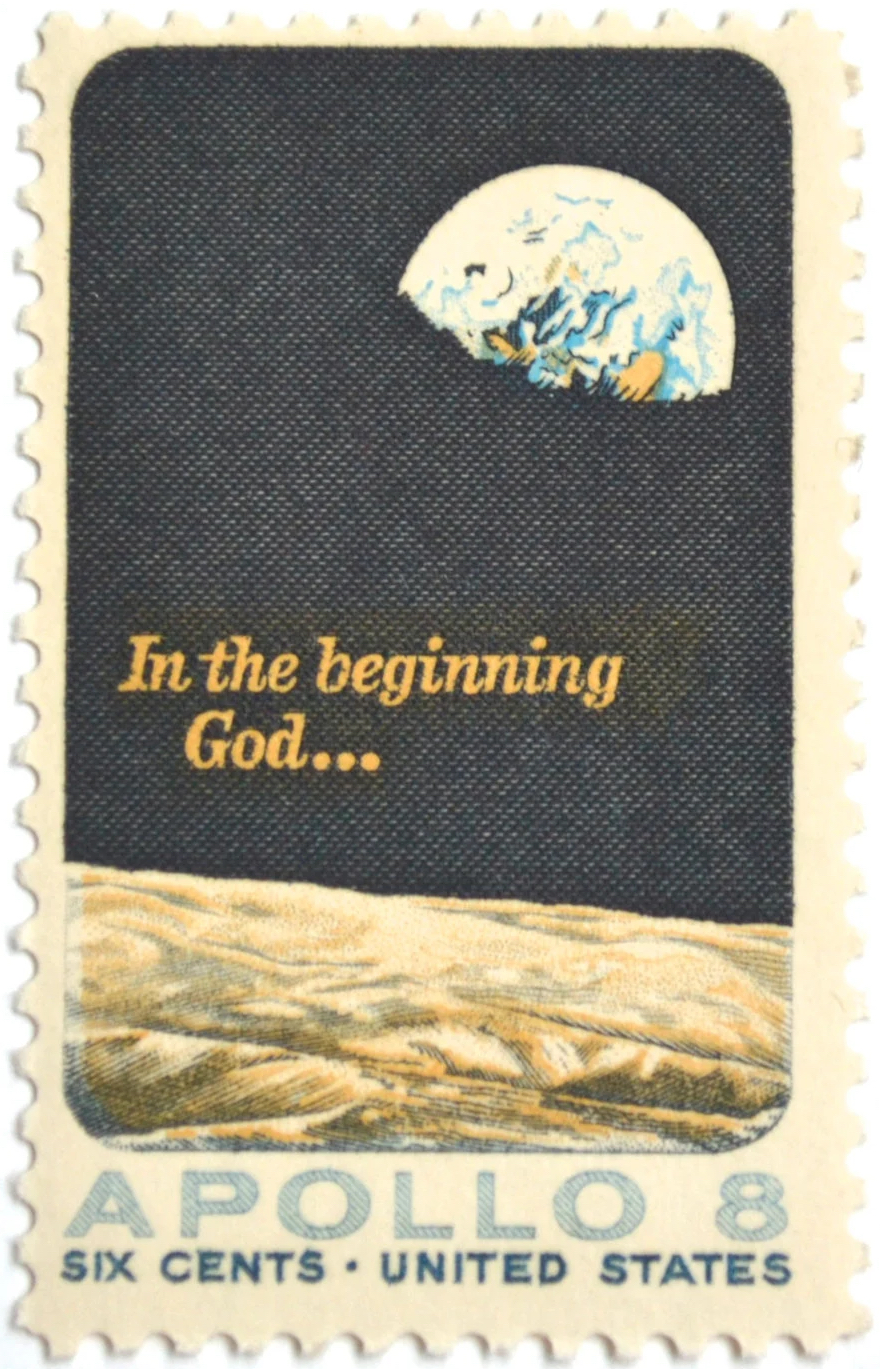
Apollo 8 commemorative stamp, issued in 1969

=== Postage stamp ===
In 1969, the United States Postal Service issued a postage stamp (Scott # 1371) to commemorate the Apollo 8 mission and the Genesis reading. The stamp includes the words "In the beginning God...", with the Apollo 8 Earthrise image in the background.

=== Art, entertainment, and media ===
==== Music and spoken word ====
- Mike Oldfield used a part of the reading of Bill Anders in the first and second song of his 1994 album The Songs of Distant Earth.
- The Israeli psychedelic trance group Astral Projection used a sample of the recording on their 1995 track "Let There Be Light".
- Christian rock group Brave Saint Saturn sampled the recording in their song "Under Bridges", from the 2000 album So Far from Home.
- The East-German alternative rock band Down Below samples the recording at the beginning of their song "How To Die In Space", from the 2004 album Silent Wings: Eternity.
- Michael Jackson used the ending part of the Apollo 8 Genesis on his song "HIStory" from his album HIStory: Past, Present and Future, Book I (1995).
- The group MGMT used the verses read by Borman as a sample in the song "Come On Christmas", from the 2005 album Climbing To New Lows.
- The progressive rock band Arena used excerpts of this broadcast in the song "Purgatory Road" from the 2005 Pepper's Ghost album.
- The Swedish progressive rock band Moon Safari used the first two sentences of Bill Anders' part on their song "Moonwalk".
- The European electronic duo VNV Nation used a sample of the recording on "Genesis", a song from their 2002 album, Futureperfect.
- The Dutch DJ Bakermat used the opening verse of the audio in his 2013 single "Uitzicht".
- Electronic music duo W&W used an excerpt of Anders' verse in their 2013 song "Lift Off".

==== Television ====
- In the 1995 Space: Above and Beyond episode "The River of Stars," the Apollo 8 recording is played for the 58th "Wildcards" Squadron.
- The entire reading is reproduced verbatim in the "1968" episode of the 1998 HBO TV miniseries From the Earth to the Moon.
- Part of the reading is used in the opening to the 2013 History Channel miniseries The Bible.
- An excerpt from Jim Lovell's section of the reading was used in the 2017 episode "Freedom & Whisky" of the Starz series Outlander (season 3, episode 5).
