= Geodesium =

Geodesium is a music project first launched in the 1970s by composer and recording artist Mark C. Petersen. The name is a combination of the terms "geodesic dome" and "planetarium" and refers to the space music Petersen creates specifically for use as scores for planetarium shows.

Under the name Geodesium, Petersen has produced soundtracks for more than 60 planetarium shows performed in installations in more than 900 planetarium facilities in more than 50 countries around the world. He has performed several live music shows in planetariums in the U.S. and the UK, but he considers his work to be a studio creation and not particularly well-suited to live performances, as his music features multiple electronic musical instruments, difficult to operate in real time.

The music of Geodesium has been featured in planetarium shows narrated by well-known screen personalities including Noah Adams, Baxter Black, Avery Brooks, Roxanne Dawson, Michael Dorn, James Earl Jones, Leonard Nimoy, William Shatner and Patrick Stewart. Petersen's music has also appeared in TV commercials for major corporations including AT&T, Ford, Pizza Hut, Honda, Coors, and the Colorado Lottery. and has been featured in a variety of NASA-produced programs, Digistar demonstration shows for Evans & Sutherland, and special-effects laserdiscs for Sky-Skan. Geodesium music has been featured on space music radio programs such as Musical Starstreams, Music from The Hearts of Space, and Opus 357.

== History ==
Petersen's interest in creating music for planetariums was sparked in 1975 when he observed the construction of the planetarium at the University of Colorado. After sharing some of his Moog synthesizer recordings with the planetarium's designer, Petersen was invited to create the music for the first show at the new facility, and was the composer-in-residence there from 1975 to 1978.

== Discography ==
All released by Loch Ness Productions:

- Geodesium, (1977)
- Double Eclipse (1981)
- West of the Galaxy (1987)
- Fourth Universe (1992)
- Anasazi (1993)
- Stellar Collections, 2001
- A Gentle Rain of Starlight (2007)
- Music From SpacePark360 (2010)
- Stella Novus (2011)
- Arcturian Archives (2011)
- Music From Infinity (2014)
- Celestial Rhythms: NYC Live '85 (2015)
- Infinite Light (2019)
- Startalk (2019)
- Stellar Collections 2 (2019)
