= Burns =

Burns may refer to:

== Astronomy ==
- 2708 Burns, an asteroid
- Burns (crater), on Mercury

== People ==
- Burns (surname), list of people and characters named Burns
  - Burns (musician), Scottish record producer

== Places in the United States ==
- Burns, Colorado
- Burns, Kansas
- Burns, Missouri
- Burns, New York
- Burns, Oregon
- Burns, Tennessee
- Burns, Wisconsin
  - Burns (community), Wisconsin
- Burns, Wyoming
- H.B. Burns Memorial Building, Washington, D.C.

== Ships of the US Navy ==
- USS Burns (DD-171), a WWI destroyer (1919–1930)
- USS Burns (DD-588), a WWII destroyer (1943 –1946)
- USS W. W. Burns (1861), a Civil-War schooner

== Other uses ==
- Burn, a skin injury
- Burns Hotel, a pub in York, England
- Burns London, an English guitar maker
- Burns Night, a celebration of Scottish poet Robert Burns

== See also ==
- Burn (disambiguation)
- Burns Township (disambiguation)
- Burnside (disambiguation)
- Burnsville (disambiguation)
- Berns (disambiguation)
- Byrnes (disambiguation)
