= Burning (disambiguation) =

Burning is combustion, a high-temperature reaction between a fuel and an oxidant.

Burning or burnin' may also refer to:

== Arts, entertainment, and media ==
=== Music ===
==== Albums ====
- Burnin' (Gil Grand album), 2002
- Burnin' (Patti LaBelle album), 1991
- Burnin' (Sonny Stitt album), 1960
- Burnin' (Bob Marley and the Wailers album), 1973
- Burnin' (John Lee Hooker album), 1962
- Burning (album), a 1983 album by Shooting Star
- Burning: A Wish, a 2001 album by Lacrimas Profundere

==== Songs ====
- "Burnin'" (Cue song), 1997
- "Burnin'" (instrumental), by Daft Punk from Homework, 1997
- "Burnin'", by Carol Douglas, 1978
- "Burnin'", by Calvin Harris & R3hab from Motion, 2014
- "Burnin'", by Paul Johnson, 1987
- "Burnin'", by The Bill Sheppard Combo, 1962
- "Burning" (Accept song), from Breaker, 1981
- "Burning" (Alcazar song), from Disco Defenders, 2009
- "Burning" (Hitsujibungaku song), 2024
- "Burning" (Maria Arredondo song), from Not Going Under, 2004
- "Burning" (Sam Smith song), from The Thrill of It All, 2017
- "Burning" (Tems song), from Born in the Wild, 2024
- "Burning", by E.M.D. from Rewind, 2010
- "Burning", by Maggie Rogers from Heard It in a Past Life, 2019
- "Burning", by Mia Martina from Devotion, 2012
- "Burning", by Monrose from Strictly Physical, 2007
- "Burning", by Orchestral Manoeuvres in the Dark from the B-side of "Sailing on the Seven Seas", 1991
- "Burning", by The War on Drugs from Lost in the Dream, 2014
- "Burning", by Robbie Rivera, 2002

=== Other uses in arts, entertainment, and media ===
- Burning (2021 film), a 2021 Australian documentary film directed by Eva Orner
- Burning (2018 film), a 2018 South Korean drama film directed by Lee Chang-dong
- "Burning" (short story), a 1978 story by Orson Scott Card

== Technology ==
- Burning, nuclear fusion
- Burning, optical disc authoring
- Dodging and burning, photographic techniques

== Other uses ==
- Death by burning, a form of execution
- Defrauding, illegal act
- Dodging and burning, photography term
- Sunburn, skin burn by the sun

== See also ==
- Burn (disambiguation)
- Burned (disambiguation)
- Burning off, airing of a TV program as filler
- Burning Star (disambiguation)
- Charring, chemical process
- Fire
- Heat
- The Burning (disambiguation)
