= Liftoff =

Liftoff, lift-off, or lift off may refer to:

== Technology ==
- Lift-off (microtechnology), a fabrication technique
- Flame lift-off, a separation of flame from burner device
- Takeoff, the first moment of flight of an aerospace vehicle
- Reduction of fuel input in a car as in lift-off oversteer

== Film and TV ==
- Lift Off (Australian TV series), an Australian educational television show
- "Liftoff" (The West Wing), an episode of the United States television show The West Wing
- Lift Off with Ayshea, a music-based British television show, originally titled Lift Off

== Music ==
- "Lift Off" (1974), by Plas Johnson
- "Lift Off" (2008), an instrumental for guitar synthesizer composed by Les Fradkin
- "Lift Off" (song) (2011), by Jay-Z, Kanye West, and Beyoncé
- "Lift Off!", a 2012 single by W&W
- "Lift Off" (2018), a song from Post Traumatic by Mike Shinoda featuring Chino Moreno & Machine Gun Kelly

== Other uses ==
- Lift Off (sculpture), in Washington, D.C., United States
- Liftoff!, a Task Force Games board game published in 1989 that simulates the international space race to land astronauts on the Moon during the mid-20th century
