= Burn (disambiguation) =

A burn is an injury to flesh caused by heat, electricity, chemicals, light, radiation, or friction. Burning often refers to combustion.

Burn may also refer to:

== People ==
- Burn (surname)
- Burn Gorman (born 1974), English actor

== Arts, entertainment, and media ==
=== Films ===
- Burn!, the English title of Gillo Pontecorvo's 1969 film Queimada
- Burn, 1998, starring David Hayter
- Burn (2012 film), a documentary about Detroit firefighters
- Burn (2019 film), a thriller starring Tilda Cobham-Hervey
- Burn (2026 film), a Japanese teenage drama

=== Music ===
==== Albums ====
- Burn (Burn EP)
- Burn (Deep Purple album)
- Burn (Defiance EP)
- Burn (Fear Factory EP)
- Burn (Havok album)
- Burn (Jo Dee Messina album)
- Burn (Melba Moore album)
- Burn (Peach album)
- Burn (Sister Machine Gun album)
- Burn (Sons of Kemet album)
- Burn Burn (album), by Our Lady Peace

==== Songs ====
- "Burn" (Alkaline Trio song), 2006
- "Burn" (BigXthaPlug and Ava Max song), 2026
- "Burn" (Deep Purple song), 1974
- "Burn" (Ellie Goulding song), 2013
- "Burn" (Hamilton song), 2015, written by Lin-Manuel Miranda for the musical Hamilton
- "Burn" (Industry song), 2009
- "Burn" (Jessica Mauboy song), 2008
- "Burn" (Juice Wrld song), 2021
- "Burn" (Meek Mill song), 2012
- "Burn" (Mobb Deep song), 2001
- "Burn" (Nine Inch Nails song), 1994
- "Burn" (Ruth Lorenzo song), 2011
- "Burn" (Tina Arena song), 1997
- "Burn" (Usher song), 2004
- "Burn", by 2hollis from Star
- "Burn", by Against Me! from Crime as Forgiven By
- "Burn", by Android Lust
- "Burn", by Apocalyptica from Worlds Collide
- "Burn", by Banks from Serpentina
- "Burn", by Collective Soul from Home
- "Burn", by Counterparts (band) from Tragedy Will Find Us
- "Burn", by Doctor and the Medics from Laughing at the Pieces
- "Burn", by Dope from Group Therapy
- "Burn", by Dropkick Murphys from Signed and Sealed in Blood
- "Burn", by Fear Factory from Remanufacture – Cloning Technology
- "Burn", by Five Iron Frenzy from Cheeses...(of Nazareth)
- "Burn", by Grave from As Rapture Comes
- "Burn", by Hamish Anderson, best blues song 2015 Independent Music Awards
- "Burn", by Haste the Day from Dissenter
- "Burn", by Impending Doom from The Sin and Doom Vol. II
- "Burn", by In Flames from I, the Mask
- "Burn", by In This Moment from Blood
- "Burn", by Kara from Jumping
- "Burn", by King Diamond from The Eye
- "Burn", by Michael Angelo Batio from Hands Without Shadows
- "Burn", by Mushroomhead from Savior Sorrow
- "Burn", by Neurosis from The Eye of Every Storm
- "Burn", by Onslaught from Killing Peace
- "Burn", by Papa Roach from Time for Annihilation: On the Record & On the Road
- "Burn", by Peach from Giving Birth to a Stone
- "Burn", by Pet Shop Boys from Super
- "Burn", by Rancid from Let's Go
- "Burn", by Rob Zombie from Hellbilly Deluxe 2
- "Burn", by Sentenced from Frozen
- "Burn", by Seven Spires from Solveig
- "Burn", by Sevendust from Alpha
- "Burn", by Shannon Noll from That's What I'm Talking About
- "Burn", by Sunmi from Full Moon
- "Burn", by The Cure from The Crow: Original Motion Picture Soundtrack
- "Burn", by The Luchagors from The Luchagors
- "Burn", by The Pretty Reckless from Going to Hell
- "Burn", by The Vamps from Wake Up
- "Burn", by Three Days Grace from Three Days Grace
- "Burn", by Toto from Toto XIV
- "Burn", by Upon a Burning Body from Southern Hostility
- "Burn", by VanVelzen
- "Burn", by Year of the Rabbit from Hunted
- "Burn", by ¥$ from Vultures 1
- "Burn!", by Megadeth from Super Collider
- "Burn: Fumetsu no Face", by B'z

==== Performers ====
- Burn (band), a hardcore band from New York

=== Other uses in arts, entertainment, and media ===
- Burn (novella), 2005, by James Patrick Kelly
- Burn card, a card discarded from the top of a deck

== Technology ==
- Orbital maneuver of a spacecraft
- Burn-in, use of hardware early in its life-cycle, intended to improve user satisfaction
- Burn-in, or screen burn, on display hardware, damage called phosphor burn-in
- Optical disc authoring
- Burnup, a measure of how much energy is extracted from a primary nuclear fuel source

== Other uses ==
- Burn, North Yorkshire, a village in England
- Burn (energy drink), a Coca-Cola brand
- Burn (landform), type of watercourses so named in Scotland, England, and New Zealand
- Burn, slang for an insult
- Dodging and burning, a type of photographic manipulation
- Sunburn, or sun burn

== See also ==
- Bern (disambiguation)
- Berne (disambiguation)
- Burn Burn (disambiguation)
- Burned (disambiguation) (includes Burnt)
- Burner (disambiguation)
- Burning (disambiguation) (includes Burnin')
- Burns (disambiguation)
- Burns (surname)
