= Burner =

Burner may refer to:

- Gas burner, coal burner or oil burner, a mechanical device that burns a gas or liquid fuel in a controlled manner
  - Laboratory gas burners:
    - Bunsen burner
    - Meker–Fisher burner
    - Teclu burner
  - Hot-air balloon device, a device to inflate a hot air balloon
- Burner (rocket stage)
- Burner (Burning Man), an active participant in the annual Burning Man festival and the surrounding community
- Burner (Breadwinner album), 1994
- Burner (Odd Nosdam album), 2005
- Burner (comics), a fictional mutant character in the Marvel Comics Universe
- Burner or stinger (medicine), a minor neurological injury suffered mostly by athletes participating in contact sports
- Burner, a CD/DVD/Blu-ray recording tool; see Optical disc drive
- Prepaid mobile phone used temporarily so that the user cannot be traced
- Burner (mobile application) for cell phone privacy
- Raleigh Burner, a 500 bc BMX bike manufactured by Rudolph Company
- Slang for a linear amplifier for CB radios
- A heating element on a kitchen stove
- Tina Burner, American drag queen
- Burner account, another term for a sock puppet account

== See also ==
- Burn (disambiguation)
