= Coal burner =

Mechanical device that burns pulverized coal

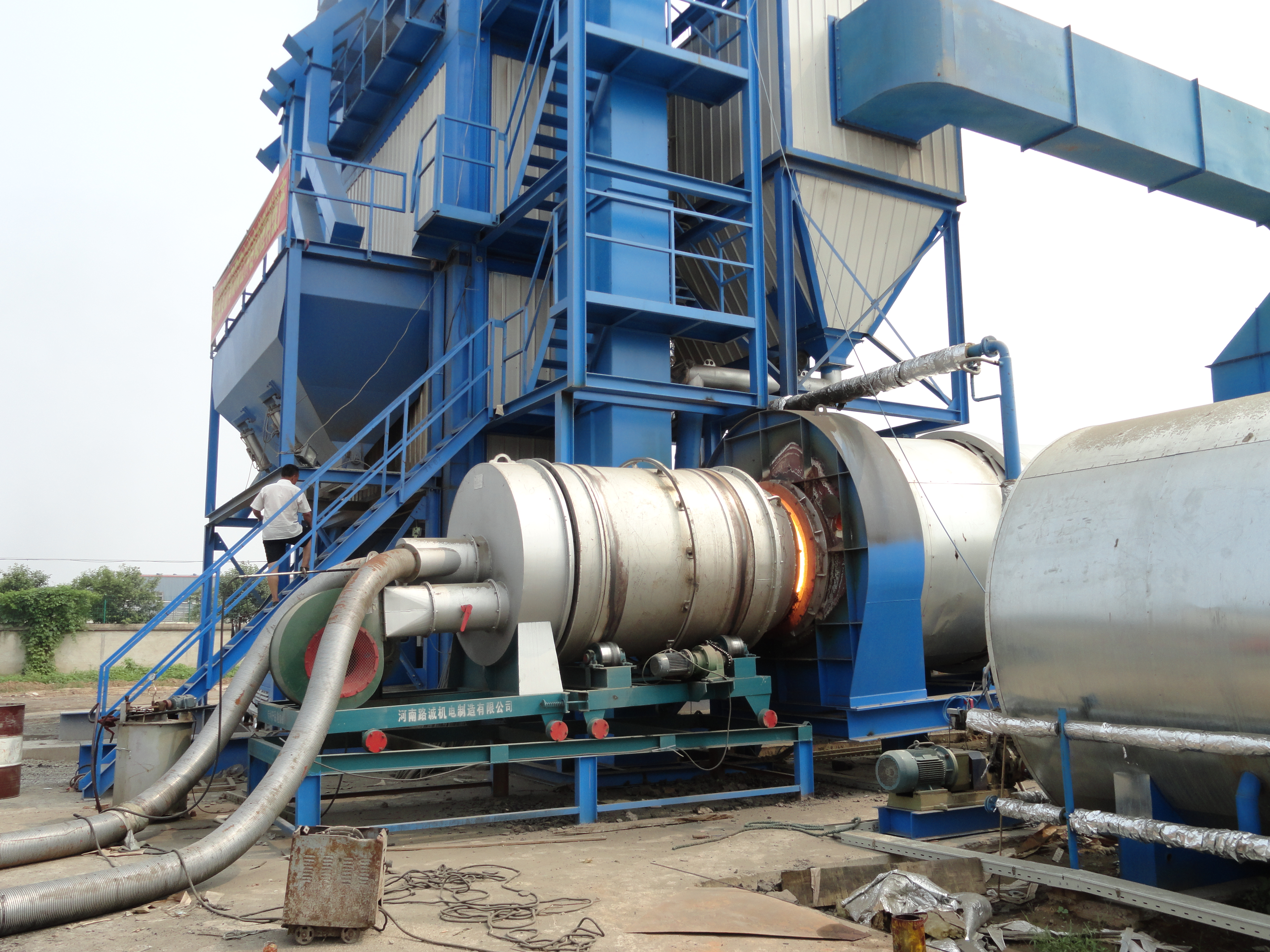
Coal burner working as a component of an asphalt plant in Thailand

A coal burner (or pulverized coal burner) is a mechanical device that burns pulverized coal (also known as powdered coal or coal dust since it is as fine as face powder in cosmetic makeup) into a flame in a controlled manner. Coal burners are mainly composed of the pulverized coal machine, the host of combustion machine (including combustion chamber, automatic back and forth motion system, automatic rotation system, the combustion air supply system) control system, ignition system, the crater and others.

== Mechanism ==
In the worksite, a coal burner usually works with the coal pulverizer and coal hopper. The coal in the hopper is conveyed to the coal pulverizer by screw conveyor. The coal pulverizer will crush the coal into pulverized coal. In the coal burner, the pulverized coal mixes with air (high-speed air flow is generated by the draft fan on the coal burner), and is ignited by the oil burning igniter.

== Ignition ==
There are mainly two ways to ignite the coal burner. These are manual and automatic, differing in that in automatic systems, a high-energy ignition device generates sparks, replacing people's hands.

== Use ==
Pulverized coal burners have a wide range of uses in industrial production and daily life, such as providing heat for boilers, hot mix asphalt plant, cement kiln, metal furnace, annealing, quenching furnace, precision casting shell burning furnace, melting furnace, forging furnace and other heating furnace or kiln.

== Requirements for coal ==
- Mark of coal: bituminous coal;
- Gross calorific value: ≥5000kcal/kg (≥ 20000kJ/kg);
- Net calorific value: ≥4200kcal/kg;
- Volatile matter: ≥25%;
- Ash Content: ≤10%;
- Total moisture: ≤35%;
- Inherent moisture: ≤14%;
- Total sulphur: ≤1%;
- Particle size: ≤20mm.

Note: These indexes are the lowest requirements for the coal.

== See also ==
- Oil burner
- Gas burner
- Pulverized coal-fired boiler
- Asphalt plant
- Boiler
- Portable stove
- Burner (disambiguation)
- Heater
