= Oil burner (disambiguation) =

Oil burner may refer to:

- Oil burner, a heating device which burns #1, #2 and #6 heating oils, diesel fuel or other similar fuels
- Oil burner (engine), a steam engine that uses oil as its fuel
- Oil burner (pipe), a pipe designed for freebasing drugs
