= The End Is Near (Five Iron Frenzy album) =

2003 album by Five Iron Frenzy

- Album cover of the double album re-release The End Is Here

Studio album by Five Iron Frenzy
- Released: June 18, 2003
- Recorded: Early 2003 (studio), November 22, 2003 (live)
- Genres: Christian rock; alternative rock
- Length: 56:31; 79:12 (reissue)
- Labels: Self-released; 5 Minute Walk (reissue)
- Producer: Frank Tate

Five Iron Frenzy chronology
Cheeses... (of Nazareth) (2003)	The End Is Near (2003)	Engine of a Million Plots (2013)

The End is Near is the fifth studio album by the American band Five Iron Frenzy, self-released on June 18, 2003. The album was later widely re-released as a part of double album titled The End is Here (stylized as The End is ~~Near~~ Here) by Five Minute Walk Records on April 20, 2004. The double album includes both the studio album and a live recording of the band's final concert performance. The album was intended as the band's last as was the tour used to promote it, until the band announced a reunion in 2011 and new album, Engine of a Million Plots released in 2013.

== Recording ==
On November 22, 2003, at the Fillmore Auditorium in Denver, Colorado, the band played their final show and recorded it, which was released the second disc on The End Is Here.

== Release ==
On April 20, 2004, the double-disc set The End is Here (stylized as The End is ~~Near~~ Here) was released. This set includes the studio album and the final performance on two separate discs.

== Reception ==
Both the original version of the studio album and the double-disc studio and live set received positive reviews.

Cross Rhythms also reviewing the first version of the studio album gave it a 10 out of 10.

Reviewing the double disc set the Christian music online magazine The Phantom Tollbooth gave it a five out of five. Likewise, HM Magazine music critic Doug Van Pelt stated that the live material captured the raw energy and spiritual fervor that the band was known for.

== Track listing ==
=== Self-Released "Red" version ===
All lyrics written by Reese Roper, unless specified otherwise.

No.	Title	Writer(s)	Length
1.	"Cannonball"	Culp, L. Ortega, Roper	3:44
2.	"At Least I'm Not Like All Those Other Old Guys"	M. Ortega, Culp	2:09
3.	"So Far, So Bad"	Culp, Roper	3:03
4.	"New Years Eve"	Culp, Roper	3:53
5.	"American Kryptonite"	Verdecchio, Culp, Roper	3:15
6.	"It Was Beautiful"	music: Verdecchio, Culp, M. Ortega, lyrics: Culp	2:47
7.	"Wizard Needs Food, Badly"	Culp, Roper	3:12
8.	"Farewell To Arms"	Verdecchio, Culp	4:03
9.	"See The Flames Begin To Crawl"	M. Ortega, Culp, Roper	3:16
10.	"Anchors Away"	Roper, Culp, M. Ortega	3:32
11.	"Something Like Laughter"	music: Culp, L. Ortega, lyrics: L. Ortega	3:13
12.	"That's How The Story Ends"	Culp, M. Ortega, Roper	3:38
13.	"On Distant Shores"	Culp, Roper, Kerr	10:15
14.	"The Cross of St. Andrew"		6:31

=== Retail released "Green" version ===
Disc one – The End is Near (Studio Album)
No.	Title	Length
1.	"Cannonball"	3:44
2.	"At Least I'm Not Like All Those Other Old Guys"	2:09
3.	"So Far, So Bad"	3:03
4.	"New Years Eve"	3:53
5.	"American Kryptonite"	3:15
6.	"It Was Beautiful"	2:47
7.	"Wizard Needs Food, Badly"	3:12
8.	"Farewell To Arms"	4:03
9.	"See The Flames Begin To Crawl"	3:16
10.	"Anchors Away"	3:32
11.	"Something Like Laughter"	3:13
12.	"That's How The Story Ends"	3:38
13.	"On Distant Shores"	5:17
14.	"Cross of St. Andrew"	34:10

Disc two – The End is Here (Farewell Live Performance, Recorded November 22, 2003)
No.	Title	Length
1.	"Intro"	0:13
2.	"Old West"	2:14
3.	"Handbook For The Sellout"	3:31
4.	"Where 0 Meets 15"	4:20
5.	"Cannonball"	3:19
6.	"Blue Comb '78"	4:23
7.	"At Least I'm Not Like All Those Other Old Guys"	1:53
8.	"You Probably Shouldn't Move Here"	4:03
9.	"Oh Canada"	3:56
10.	"When I Go Out"	1:45
11.	"See The Flames Begin To Crawl"	3:13
12.	"Vultures"	3:26
13.	"You Can't Handle This"	4:42
14.	"American Kryptonite"	3:05
15.	"The Phantom Mullet"	3:12
16.	"Medley"	9:13
17.	"A New Hope"	2:35
18.	"World Without End"	6:03
19.	"Every New Day"	13:31

== Charts ==
Chart (2004)	Peak position
US Top Heatseekers (Billboard)	13

== Personnel ==
- Reese Roper - lead vocals
- Dennis Culp - trombone, background vocals, lead vocals on "So Far, So Bad"
- Keith Hoerig - bass
- Nathanael "Brad" Dunham - trumpet
- Micah Ortega - guitars, background vocals
- Leanor "Jeff the Girl" Ortega - saxophones
- Andy Verdecchio - drums
- Sonnie Johnston - guitars
