= Stamped asphalt =

Decorative finish on asphalt concrete

Stamped asphalt is a decorative product which is made by transforming regular asphalt into imitation brick, stone, or slate. The process involves the creation of an impression into an asphalt surface using a combination of heat, a stamping template, and a plate compactor. Creating impressions in the asphalt can be achieved by working behind a paver or reheating the asphalt with reheating equipment.
