= Berns =

Berns may refer to:

== People ==
- Berns (surname)

== Places ==
- Berns Salonger, a restaurant and entertainment venue in Stockholm, Sweden
- Bern's Steak House, a restaurant in Florida, USA

== See also ==
- Burns (disambiguation)
