= Burned =

Burned or burnt may refer to:

- Anything which has undergone combustion
- Burned (image), quality of an image transformed with loss of detail in all portions lighter than some limit, and/or those darker than some limit
- Burnt (film), a 2015 drama film starring Bradley Cooper
- Burned (album), 1995 album by Electrafixion
- "Burned" (Arrow), an episode of Arrow
- "Burned" (CSI: Miami), an episode of CSI: Miami
- "Burned" (Justified), an episode of Justified
- "Burned" (The Twilight Zone), a 2003 episode of The Twilight Zone
- Burned (Hopkins novel), a 2005 novel by Ellen Hopkins
- Burned (Cast novel), a 2010 novel by P. C. Cast
- Burned, a novel in the Hardy Boy's Undercover Brothers series
- Burned (TV series), 2003 MTV television series
- "Burned", a song written by Neil Young on the eponymous Buffalo Springfield album
- "Burned", a song by Hilary Duff from Dignity, 2007
- "Burnt", a song by Spratleys Japs from Pony, 1999

== See also ==
- Burning (disambiguation)
- Burn (disambiguation)
