= The Burning =

The Burning may refer to:

- The Burning (1981 film), a slasher film
- The Burning (2019 film), a Spanish comedy thriller film
- "The Burning" (Seinfeld), an episode of the American sitcom Seinfeld
- "The Burning", a Civil War military action conducted by Philip Sheridan

== Music ==
- The Burning (Thunderstone album), 2004
- The Burning (The Crown album), 1995
- The Burning (British Lion album), 2020
- The Burning EP by the musical group Ice Nine Kills, 2007

== Literature ==
- The Burning (play), by Stewart Conn
- The Burning (novel), a 2000 Doctor Who novel
- Guardians of Ga'hoole: The Burning, a 2004 novel
- "The Burning", short story by Jack Cady

== See also ==
- Burning (disambiguation)
