= Buzz Aldrin's Race Into Space =

1993 video game

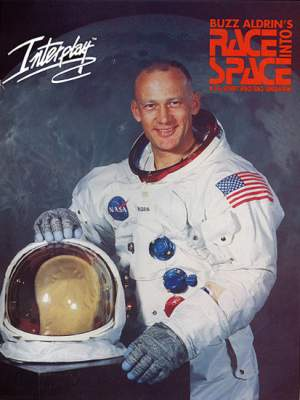
- Developer: Strategic Visions
- Publisher: Interplay Productions
- Platforms: MS-DOS, PC-98
- Release: March 11, 1993: Floppy disk: March 11, 1993 CD-ROM: 1994
- Genres: Turn-based strategy, Construction and management simulation
- Modes: Single-player, Multiplayer

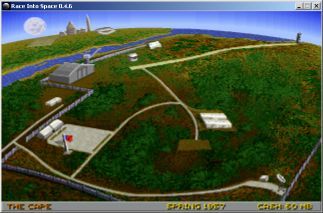
Cape Canaveral in BARIS

Buzz Aldrin's Race Into Space, frequently abbreviated BARIS, is a 1993 space simulation strategy game for MS-DOS. The player takes the role of Administrator of NASA or head of the Soviet space program with the ultimate goal of being the first side to conduct a successful crewed Moon landing. It was developed by Strategic Visions and published by Interplay Productions as a computer version of Liftoff!, a 1989 board game developed by Fritz Bronner. BARIS was re-released in 1994 on CD-ROM, incorporating the earlier updates to the floppy disk version, a few new updates, improved video of the mission launches, and new multiplayer modes.

The developers worked to maintain historical accuracy, including all the actual major space hardware and several alternative proposals that were considered at the time, but did make some compromises and simplifications in the name of game balance and avoiding complexity. They also consulted Apollo 11 astronaut Buzz Aldrin, who gave permission for his name to be used for the game.

== Gameplay ==
Buzz Aldrin's Race Into Space has two sides, the United States and the Soviet Union, unlike Liftoff! which supported up to four (the other two sides in Liftoff! were Europe and Asia). Each player controls a space center, which doubles as a navigational menu, and directs funding toward purchasing hardware, research and development, recruiting and training astronauts, and conducting launches.

While the ultimate goal of the game is to conduct a successful crewed Moon landing, it is necessary to complete several milestone achievements to ensure success. Historical milestones in the game range from launching a satellite, like Sputnik 1, to conducting a lunar orbital mission, like Apollo 8. Skipping a milestone results in a safety penalty to any mission depending on it. For example, skipping a crewed lunar orbital mission would cause a safety penalty to all mission steps during a Moon landing mission.

Play begins in spring of 1957 and proceeds with turns lasting six months each for up to 20 years to the end of 1977, or until the first player successfully conducts a crewed Moon landing, or until one player is dismissed from his/her program (this happens rarely, and only to a human player who is essentially doing nothing). At the start of each turn, the game randomly chooses an "event card" to give the player, usually with a piece of historical information, and sometimes with positive or negative effects on the game. For example, the player may be informed that Operation Paperclip has increased the effect of research and development for that turn.

On the way to the Moon landing, the two space programs compete for prestige in order to secure funding. Players gain prestige points through space exploration "firsts", which include historical milestone missions that improve lunar mission safety, but also ancillary achievements, such as the first Mars flyby (historically Mariner 4) or first woman in space (historically Valentina Tereshkova). The player to make the second successful mission of a certain type will typically gain some prestige points, whereas subsequent missions may earn very few or no points. Prestige points are lost through mission failures, especially those involving astronaut/cosmonaut fatalities.

The heart of the game is the space missions, which come down to dice rolls. At each step of a mission, the safety factor of the relevant component is checked against a random number, adjusted by relevant astronaut skill bonuses (if the mission is crewed), safety penalties and other factors. If the check fails, an error occurs. Such an error may range from catastrophic mission failure down to no effect (e.g. "The first imprint in the lunar surface is in fact made by a helmet visor. Crewman okay."). Placing a satellite in orbit has three steps, while a Moon landing can have well over twenty. Missions are generally non-interactive; occasionally during an incident, the player may be given the option of aborting or proceeding.

== History ==
=== Development ===
While developing LIFTOFF! with Task Force Games, Fritz Bronner had considered making a computer version, but did not find much interest within Task Force. As Task Force had not optioned the LIFTOFF! computer game when they were contractually able, Bronner decided to undertake the development independently. In November 1990 he met and recruited then 22-year-old Michael McCarty as programmer and formed Strategic Visions as a partnership, but concluded that publishing would be too daunting a task. They initially decided to program for Amiga and released a videotape demo on that platform in June 1991. However, by September they concluded that the Amiga market was shrinking and decided to change platforms to IBM PC compatible.

In August 1991, Strategic Visions signed with Interplay Entertainment to publish the game, with a projected release of May 1992. By this time, Buzz Aldrin was on the project in an advisory role. It was also around this time that Bronner added the feature of astronaut/cosmonaut skills and morale, which previously made no impact on the performance of a mission. Astronaut/cosmonaut skills were initially randomized at the start of each game.

Strategic Visions and Interplay showed a demo of Buzz Aldrin's Race Into Space at the 1992 Consumer Electronics Show in Las Vegas, Nevada, and also held a reception at Caesars Palace where Buzz Aldrin spoke about his experiences in the space program.

Software testing began in September 1992, which proved a daunting task: one tester calculated that with all mission types and hardware permutations factored in, there were over 12,000 possible missions. With failure modes factored in, this number increased to approximately 50 million possible mission outcomes.

In January 1993, the informative companion to the manual was the last major step delaying shipping. The book was written by Anthony Mesaros with help from NASA and was a detailed description of the Space Race with Russia and a very detailed description of the various rockets and space modules the US and Russia had created. Anthony had the book completed before the game was done but took 2.5 weeks to do the layout, design, and edit and then another 6 weeks before it came back from the printers.

=== Release ===
In March 1993, Buzz Aldrin's Race Into Space was ready to be released after a production which had lasted 28 months. The final floppy disk version had some 100 megabytes of photographs and animations cut due to space limitations, and the then-planned modem play was cut as well. Immediately upon completion of the floppy version, however, work began on the CD-ROM version. The CD-ROM version was produced by Interplay's Rusty Buchert, who also produced Descent. BARIS was re-released in 1994 on CD-ROM, incorporating the earlier updates to the floppy disk version, a few new updates, improved video of the mission launches, and new multiplayer modes.

=== Race Into Space ===
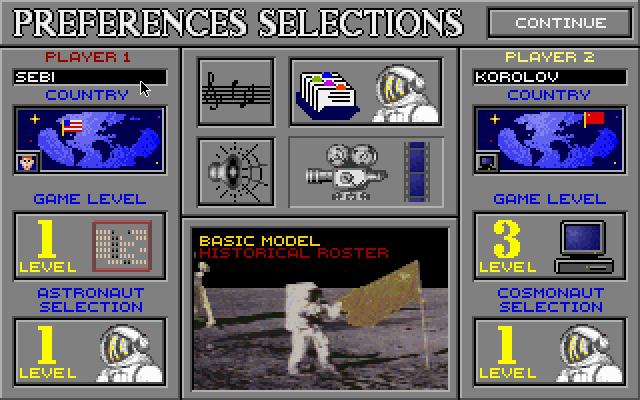
Screenshot of the game's selection screen (v1.1.0.2 Pandora version).

After the 2005 bankruptcy of publisher Interplay, the developers released the game's source code and content under a GPL license, and the game's music as freeware. The resulting project, now called Race Into Space, is hosted on GitHub. The game has now been ported to modern operating systems and additional platforms (for instance Pandora), with some improvements over the original.

Version 2.0 of Race Into Space was released in 2025, converting the game from C to C++, fixing a host of bugs from the original version, adding many quality of life features, and fixing some historical inaccuracies.

=== Buzz Aldrin's Space Program Manager ===
In October 2014, Slitherine Strategies released the first version of a game titled Buzz Aldrin's Space Program Manager. The game focuses on research, development and mission planning, and shares many features with the original BARIS, with better graphics, but much less mission and historical detail.

== Reception ==
While Interplay and others had billed the game upon its release as being appropriate for children as young as age 10, it drew criticism for being extremely difficult. It was also criticized by The Guardian as being "rather lifeless". Computer Gaming World was more positive, wishing for a CD-ROM version but stating that it was a "game that should appeal to anyone with even a casual interest in space exploration".

The game received a 90/100 score from PC Gamer UK, was a finalist for the COMPUTE! Choice Awards in 1993. In 1994, PC Gamer UK named Race Into Space the 26th best computer game of all time. The editors called it "the most successful piece of 'educational' software available for the PC".

It has remained popular enough with fans to spawn an open-source version from the original developers at Strategic Visions in 2005, which was downloaded from SourceForge between 2005 and 2017 over 90,000 times. Some of the improvements mentioned above have made the game less difficult.

== Realism ==
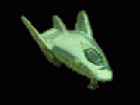
"XMS-2" reusable minishuttle, a fictional successor to the X-20 Dyna-Soar (the picture used is actually of the X-24A lifting body).

While Strategic Visions worked to accurately simulate space launches and the act of running either space program, they made a number of simplifications for balancing as well as for the game to make sense. For example, four NASA launch facilities are condensed into one superfacility. More significant is the elimination of some minor rocket programs, such as Redstone, and the addition of docking capability to the Voskhod spacecraft. There is also a "basic" model in the game which equalizes costs and safety factors between both sides. Despite this, BARIS still features most of the major pieces of hardware and approaches to Moon landing that were considered, including lunar orbit rendezvous (which was the strategy used successfully in Project Apollo), Earth orbit rendezvous (though in a different form) and direct ascent.
