= Marshall Stability Method =

The Marshall Stability Method is used in pavement design to determine the Optimum Binder Content (OBC) in asphalt concrete.
