= Asphalt concrete =

Composite material used for paving

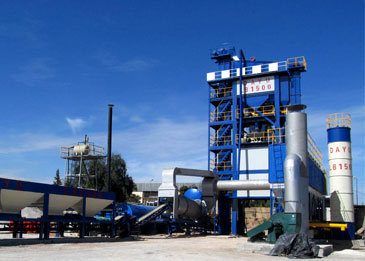
Asphalt batch mix plant

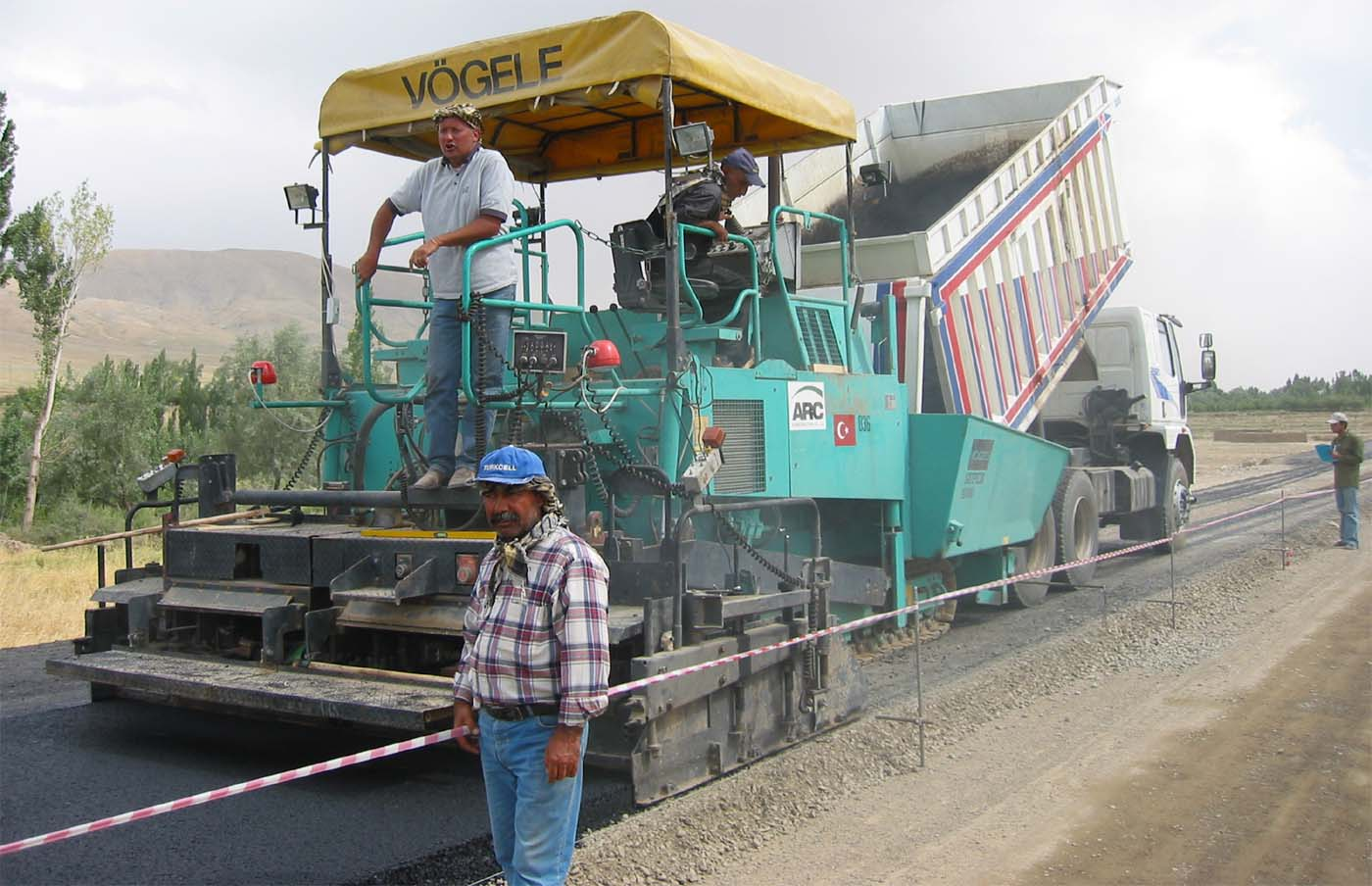
A machine laying asphalt concrete, fed from a dump truck

Asphalt concrete or asphaltic concrete (commonly called asphalt, blacktop, or pavement in North America, and tarmac, bitmac or bitumen macadam in the United Kingdom and Ireland) is a composite material commonly used to surface roads, parking lots, airports, and the core of embankment dams. Asphalt mixtures have been used in pavement construction since the nineteenth century. It consists of mineral aggregate bound together with bitumen (a substance also independently known as asphalt, pitch, or tar), laid in layers, and compacted.

The American English terms asphalt (or asphaltic) concrete, bituminous asphalt concrete, and bituminous mixture are typically used only in engineering and construction documents, which define concrete as any composite material composed of mineral aggregate adhered with a binder. The abbreviation, AC, is sometimes used for asphalt concrete but can also denote asphalt content or asphalt cement, referring to the liquid asphalt portion of the composite material.

== History ==
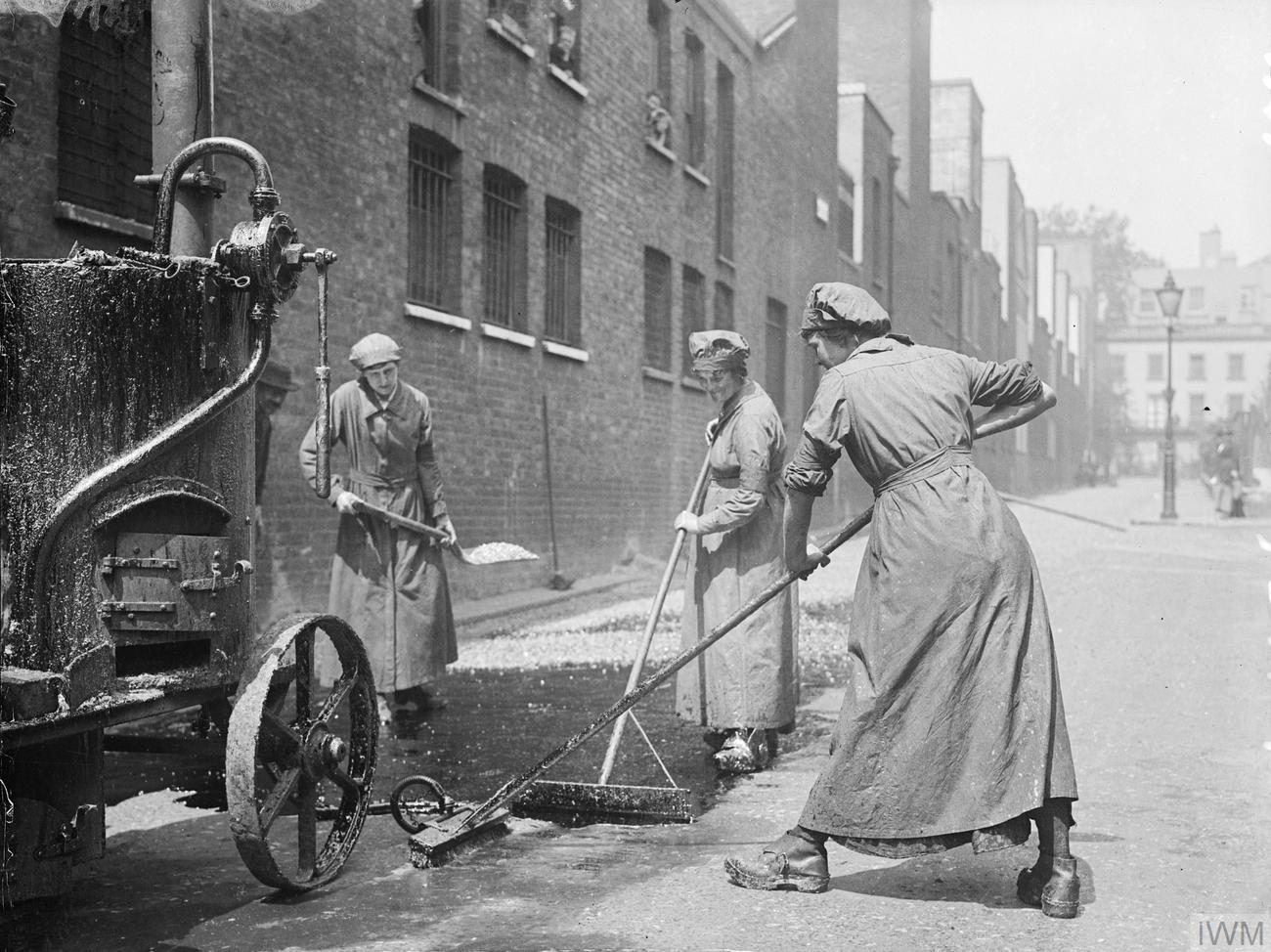
Tar being applied to a London road during World War I

Natural asphalt (Ancient Greek: ἄσφαλτος, romanized: ásphaltos) has been known of and used since antiquity, in Mesopotamia, Phoenicia, Egypt, Babylon, Greece, Carthage, and Rome, to waterproof temple baths, reservoirs, aqueducts, tunnels, and moats, as a masonry mortar, to caulk vessels, and surface roads.

The Procession Street of Babylonian King Nabopolassar, c. 625 BC, leading north from his palace through the city's wall, was described as being constructed from burnt brick and asphalt.

Natural asphalt covered and bonded cobblestones were used from 1824 in France as a means to construct roads, as were moulded asphalt cobbles or blocks, formed from rammed natural rock asphalt.

In 1829 natural Seyssel asphalt mixed with 7% aggregate, to create an asphat-mastic surface, was used for a footpath at Pont Morand, Lyon, France, the technique spreading to Paris in 1835, London, England, in 1836, and Philadelphia, United States, in 1838.

In 1834, John Henry Cassell & Company of Poplar, London, a pitch and varnish supplier, obtained an English patent for a method to surface roads with a layer of tar, covered by a layer of macadam, and sealed with a layer of tar and sand, and marketed the surface "lava stone for paving and waterproofing"; soon after being contracted to surface the approach road to Vauxhall bridge, and a road in Millwall, London.

In 1837, R. T. Claridge obtained a similar English patent (GB patent 1837 #7849), substituting Seyssel asphalt as the binder, having seen it employed in France and Belgium; he would subsequently form the Claridge's Patent Asphalte Company, in 1838.

A 2-mile (3.2 km) stretch of a gravel constructed road, running out of Nottingham, was experimentally covered in natural asphalt in 1840. This experiment was repeated in 1845 in Huntingdon High Street.

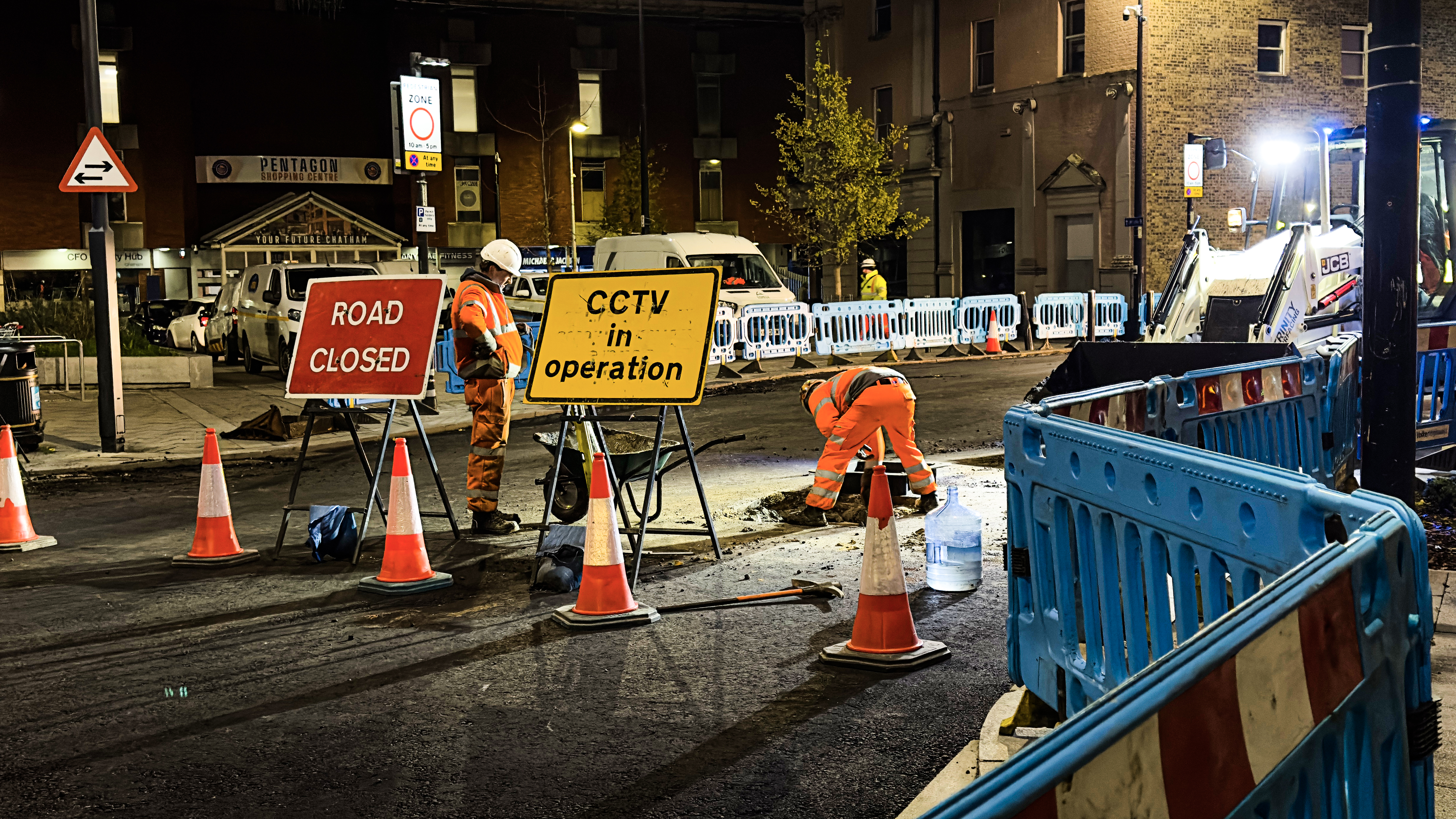
Globe Lane being resurfaced by workers in Chatham, Kent, England

A macadam road surfaced with asphalt was constructed in 1852, between Paris and Perpignan, France, using Swiss Val de Travers rock asphalt (natural asphalt-covered limestone aggregate).

In 1869, Threadneedle Street, in London, was resurfaced with Swiss Val de Travers rock asphalt.

A process to surface a packed sand road through application of heated natural asphalt mixed with sand, in a ratio of 1:5, rolling, and hardened through the application of natural asphalt mixed with a petroleum oil, was invented in 1870 at Columbia University by Belgian-American chemist Edward de Smedt, who obtained a pair of U.S. patents for the material and method of hardening.

Civil engineer, surveyor, and an English county highway board member, Edgar Purnell Hooley, created a process and engine to combine petroleum bitumen with macadam aggregates (gravel, Portland cement, crushed rocks, and blast furnace slag) in a steam heated mixer, at 212 °F (100 °C), and through a heated reservoir, conduits, and meshes, create a machine and material that can be applied to form a road surface. He filed a UK patent, in 1902, for his improvement. Hooley founding a UK company to market the technology, where the term tar macadam, shortened to tarmac, was coined, after the name of his company Tar Macadam (Purnell Hooley's Patent) Syndicate Limited, derived from the combination of tar and macadam gravel composite mixtures.

== Mixture formulations ==
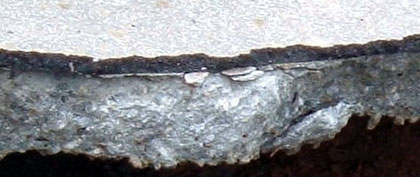
As shown in this cross-section, many older roadways are smoothed by applying a thin layer of asphalt concrete to the existing Portland cement concrete, creating a composite pavement.

Mixing of asphalt and aggregate is accomplished in one of several ways:

Hot-mix asphalt concrete (commonly abbreviated as HMA)
This is produced by heating the bitumen binder to decrease its viscosity and drying the aggregate to remove moisture from it prior to mixing. Mixing is generally performed with the aggregate at about 150 °C (300 °F) for virgin asphalt and 170 °C (330 °F) for polymer modified asphalt, and the asphalt cement at 93 °C (200 °F). Paving and compaction must be performed while the asphalt is sufficiently hot. In many locales paving is restricted to summer months because in winter the base will cool the asphalt too quickly before it can be packed to the required density. HMA is the form of asphalt concrete most commonly used on high traffic pavements such as those on major highways, racetracks and airfields. It is also used as an environmental liner for landfills, reservoirs, and fish hatchery ponds.

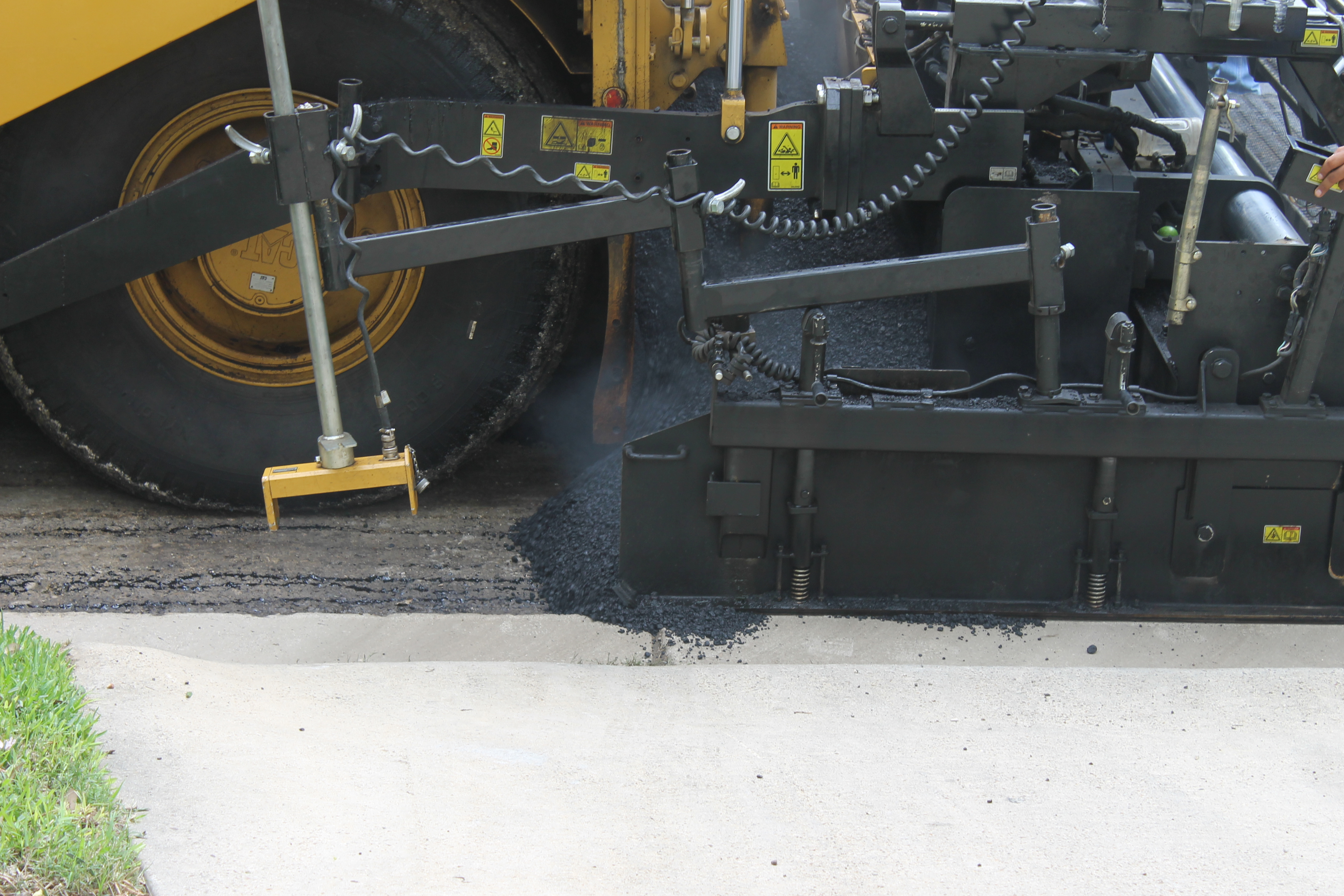
Asphaltic concrete laying machine in operation in Laredo, Texas

Warm-mix asphalt concrete (commonly abbreviated as WMA)
This is produced by adding either zeolites, waxes, asphalt emulsions or sometimes water to the asphalt binder prior to mixing. This allows significantly lower mixing and laying temperatures and results in lower consumption of fossil fuels, thus releasing less carbon dioxide, aerosols and vapors. This improves working conditions, and lowers laying-temperature, which leads to more rapid availability of the surface for use, which is important for construction sites with critical time schedules. The usage of these additives in hot-mixed asphalt (above) may afford easier compaction and allow cold-weather paving or longer hauls. Use of warm mix is rapidly expanding. A survey of US asphalt producers found that nearly 25% of asphalt produced in 2012 was warm mix, a 416% increase since 2009. Cleaner road pavements can be potentially developed by combining WMA and material recycling. Warm Mix Asphalt (WMA) technology has environmental, production, and economic benefits.
Cold-mix asphalt concrete
This is produced by emulsifying the bitumen in water with an emulsifying agent before mixing with the aggregate. While in its emulsified state, the bitumen is less viscous and the mixture is easy to work and compact. The emulsion will break after enough water evaporates and the cold mix will, ideally, take on the properties of an HMA pavement. Cold mix is commonly used as a patching material and on lesser-trafficked service roads.
Cut-back asphalt concrete
Is a form of cold mix asphalt produced by dissolving the binder in kerosene or another lighter fraction of petroleum before mixing with the aggregate. While in its dissolved state, the bitumen is less viscous and the mix is easy to work and compact. After the mix is laid down the lighter fraction evaporates. Because of concerns with pollution from the volatile organic compounds in the lighter fraction, cut-back asphalt has been largely replaced by asphalt emulsion.
Mastic asphalt concrete, or sheet asphalt
This is produced by heating hard grade blown bitumen (i.e., partly oxidised) in a green cooker (mixer) until it has become a viscous liquid after which the aggregate mix is then added. The bitumen aggregate mixture is cooked (matured) for around 6–8 hours and once it is ready, the mastic asphalt mixer is transported to the work site where experienced layers empty the mixer and either machine or hand lay the mastic asphalt contents on to the road. Mastic asphalt concrete is generally laid to a thickness of around 20–30 millimetres (13/16–1 3/16 in) for footpath and road applications and around 10 millimetres (3/8 in) for flooring or roof applications.
High-modulus asphalt concrete, sometimes referred to by the French-language acronym EMÉ (enrobé à module élevé)
This uses a very hard bituminous formulation (penetration 10/20), sometimes modified, in proportions close to 6% by weight of the aggregates, as well as a high proportion of mineral powder (between 8–10%) to create an asphalt concrete layer with a high modulus of elasticity (of the order of 13000 MPa). This makes it possible to reduce the thickness of the base layer up to 25% (depending on the temperature) in relation to conventional bitumen, while offering very high fatigue strengths. High-modulus asphalt layers are used both in reinforcement operations and in the construction of new reinforcements for medium and heavy traffic. In base layers, they tend to exhibit a greater capacity of absorbing tensions and, in general, better fatigue resistance.

In addition to the asphalt and aggregate, additives, such as polymers, and antistripping agents may be added to improve the properties of the final product.

Areas paved with asphalt concrete—especially airport aprons—have been called "the tarmac" at times, despite not being constructed using the tarmacadam process.

A variety of specialty asphalt concrete mixtures have been developed to meet specific needs, such as stone-matrix asphalt, which is designed to ensure a strong wearing surface, or porous asphalt pavements, which are permeable and allow water to drain through the pavement for controlling storm water.

== Roadway performance characteristics ==
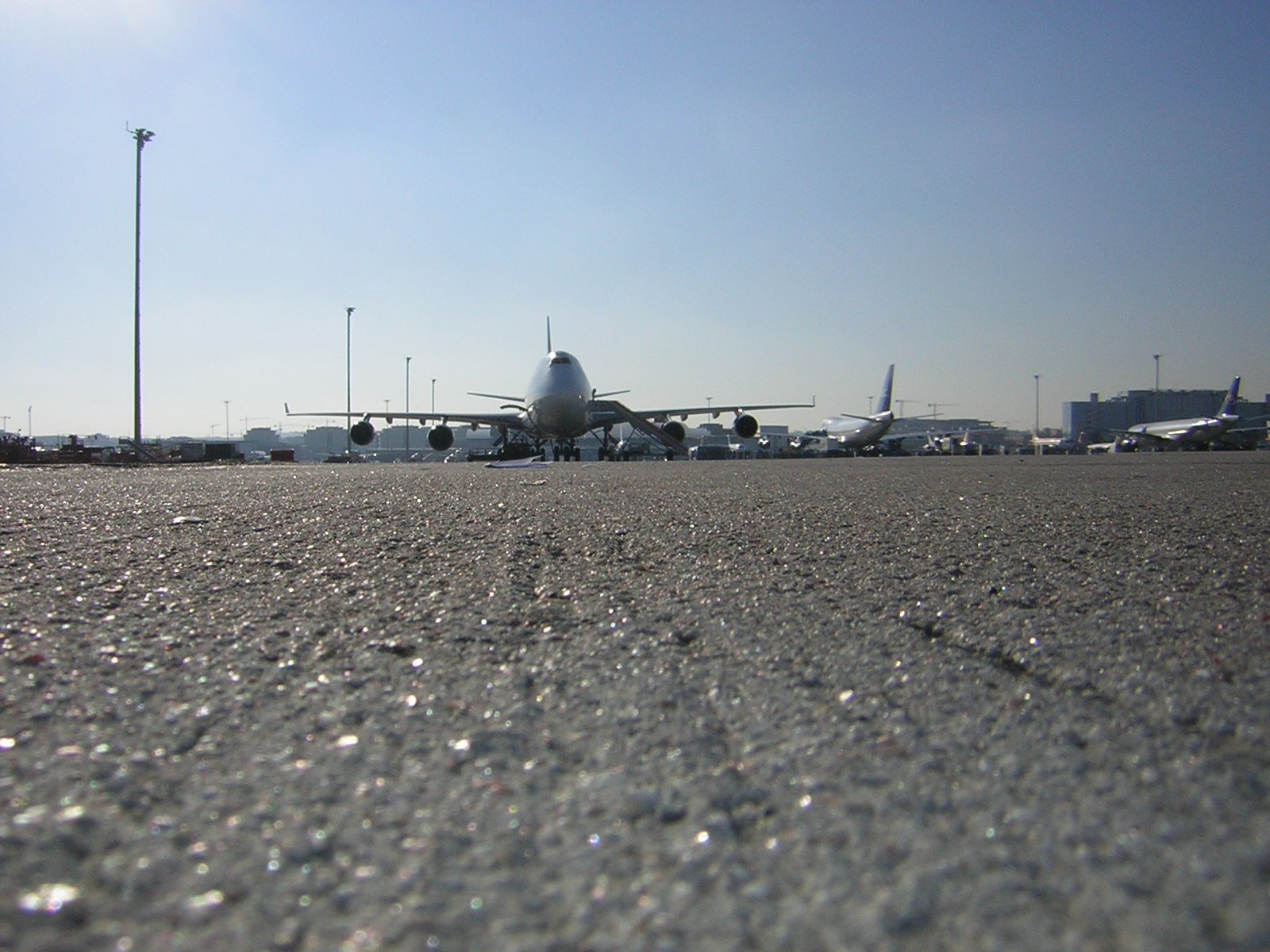
An airport taxiway, one of the uses of asphalt concrete

Different types of asphalt concrete have different performance characteristics in roads in terms of surface durability, tire wear, braking efficiency and roadway noise. In principle, the determination of appropriate asphalt performance characteristics must take into account the volume of traffic in each vehicle category, and the performance requirements of the friction course. In general, the viscosity of asphalt allows it to conveniently form a convex surface, and a central apex to streets and roads to drain water to the edges. This is not, however, in itself an advantage over concrete, which has various grades of viscosity and can be formed into a convex road surface. Rather, it is the economy of asphalt concrete that renders it more frequently used. Concrete is found on interstate highways where maintenance is highly crucial.

Asphalt concrete generates less roadway noise than a Portland cement concrete surface, and is typically less noisy than chip seal surfaces. Because tire noise is generated through the conversion of kinetic energy to sound waves, more noise is produced as the speed of a vehicle increases. The notion that highway design might take into account acoustical engineering considerations, including the selection of the type of surface paving, arose in the early 1970s.

With regard to structural performance, the asphalt behaviour depends on a variety of factors including the material, loading and environmental condition. Furthermore, the performance of pavement varies over time. Therefore, the long-term behaviour of asphalt pavement is different from its short-term performance. The LTPP is a research program by the FHWA, which is specifically focusing on long-term pavement behaviour.

== Degradation and restoration ==
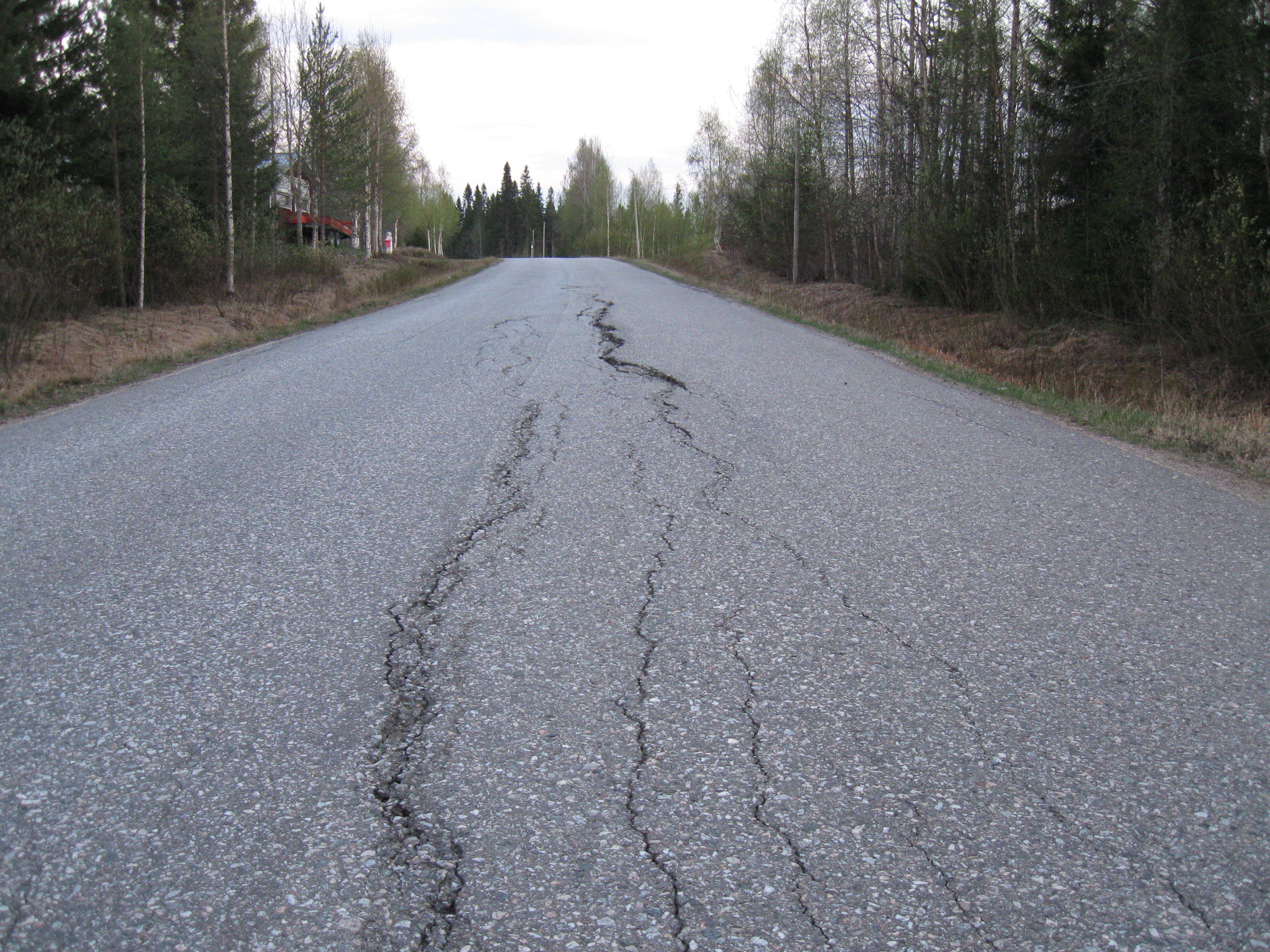
Asphalt damaged by frost heaves

Asphalt deterioration can include crocodile cracking, potholes, upheaval, raveling, bleeding, rutting, shoving, stripping, and grade depressions. In cold climates, frost heaves can crack asphalt even in one winter. Filling the cracks with bitumen is a temporary fix, but only proper compaction and drainage can slow this process.

Factors that cause asphalt concrete to deteriorate over time mostly fall into one of three categories: construction quality, environmental considerations, and traffic loads. Often, damage results from combinations of factors in all three categories.

Construction quality is critical to pavement performance. This includes the construction of utility trenches and appurtenances that are placed in the pavement after construction. Lack of compaction in the surface of the asphalt, especially on the longitudinal joint, can reduce the life of a pavement by 30 to 40%. Service trenches in pavements after construction have been said to reduce the life of the pavement by 50%, mainly due to the lack of compaction in the trench, and because of water intrusion through improperly sealed joints.

Environmental factors include heat and cold, the presence of water in the subbase or subgrade soil underlying the pavement, and frost heaves.

High temperatures soften the asphalt binder, allowing heavy tire loads to deform the pavement into ruts. Paradoxically, high heat and strong sunlight also cause the asphalt to oxidize, becoming stiffer and less resilient, leading to crack formation. Cold temperatures can cause cracks as the asphalt contracts. Cold asphalt is also less resilient and more vulnerable to cracking.

Water trapped under the pavement softens the subbase and subgrade, making the road more vulnerable to traffic loads. Water under the road freezes and expands in cold weather, causing and enlarging cracks. In spring thaw, the ground thaws from the top down, so water is trapped between the pavement above and the still-frozen soil underneath. This layer of saturated soil provides little support for the road above, leading to the formation of potholes. This is more of a problem for silty or clay soils than sandy or gravelly soils. Some jurisdictions pass frost laws to reduce the allowable weight of trucks during the spring thaw season and protect their roads.

The damage a vehicle causes is roughly proportional to the axle load raised to the fourth power, so doubling the weight an axle carries actually causes 16 times as much damage. Wheels cause the road to flex slightly, resulting in fatigue cracking, which often leads to crocodile cracking. Vehicle speed also plays a role. Slowly moving vehicles stress the road over a longer period of time, increasing ruts, cracking, and corrugations in the asphalt pavement.

Other causes of damage include heat damage from vehicle fires, or solvent action from chemical spills.

=== Prevention and repair of degradation ===
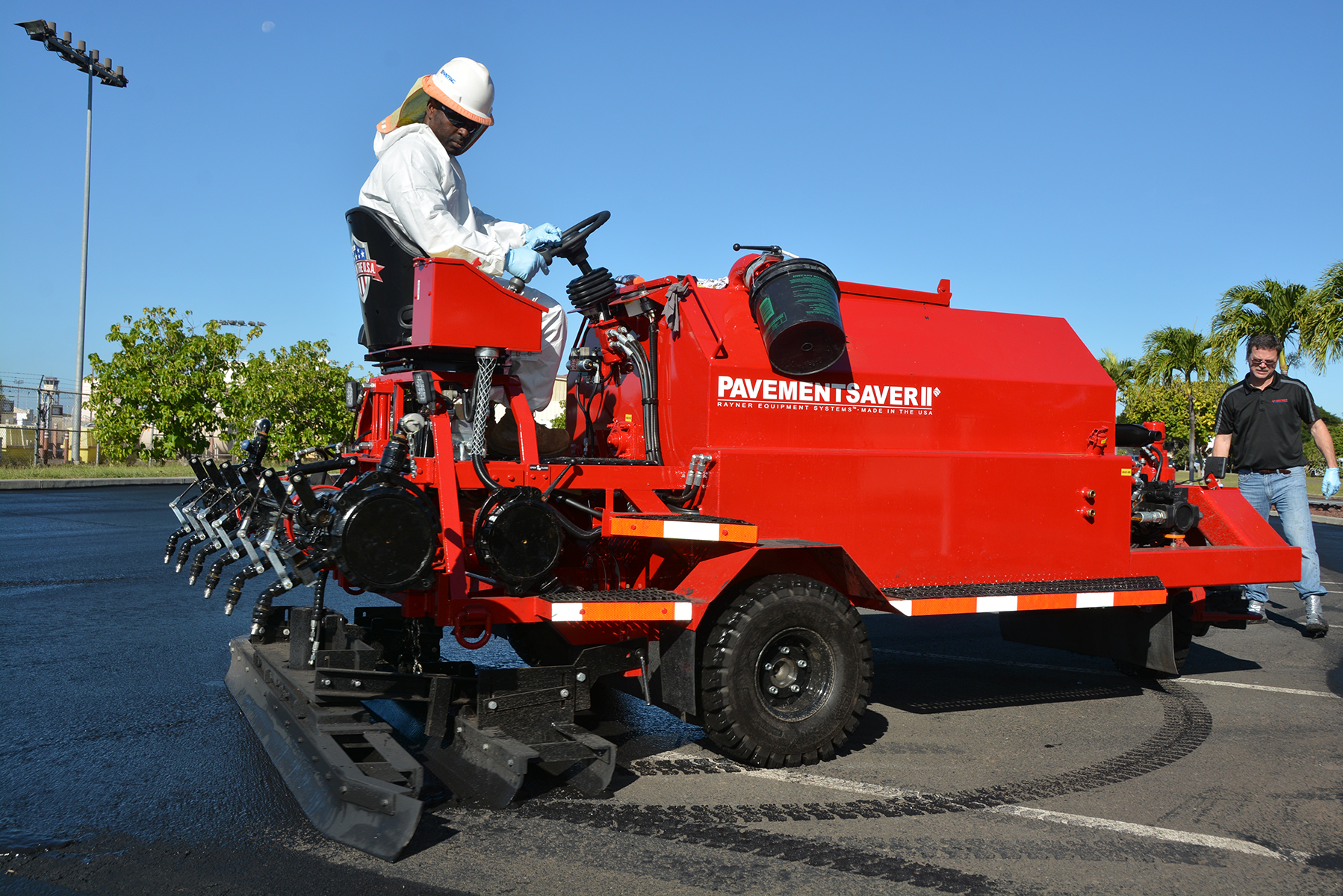
Machine sealcoating asphalt pavement

The life of a road can be prolonged through good design, construction and maintenance practices. During design, engineers measure the traffic on a road, paying special attention to the number and types of trucks. They also evaluate the subsoil to see how much load it can withstand. The pavement and subbase thicknesses are designed to withstand the wheel loads. Sometimes, geogrids are used to reinforce the subbase and further strengthen the roads. Drainage, including ditches, storm drains and underdrains are used to remove water from the roadbed, preventing it from weakening the subbase and subsoil.

Sealcoating asphalt is a maintenance measure that helps keep water and petroleum products out of the pavement.

Maintaining and cleaning ditches and storm drains will extend the life of the road at low cost. Sealing small cracks with bituminous crack sealer prevents water from enlarging cracks through frost weathering, or percolating down to the subbase and softening it.

For somewhat more distressed roads, a chip seal or similar surface treatment may be applied. As the number, width and length of cracks increases, more intensive repairs are needed. In order of generally increasing expense, these include thin asphalt overlays, multicourse overlays, grinding off the top course and overlaying, in-place recycling, or full-depth reconstruction of the roadway.

It is far less expensive to keep a road in good condition than it is to repair it once it has deteriorated. This is why some agencies place the priority on preventive maintenance of roads in good condition, rather than reconstructing roads in poor condition. Poor roads are upgraded as resources and budget allow. In terms of lifetime cost and long term pavement conditions, this will result in better system performance. Agencies that concentrate on restoring their bad roads often find that by the time they have repaired them all, the roads that were in good condition have deteriorated.

Some agencies use a pavement management system to help prioritize maintenance and repairs.

== Recycling ==
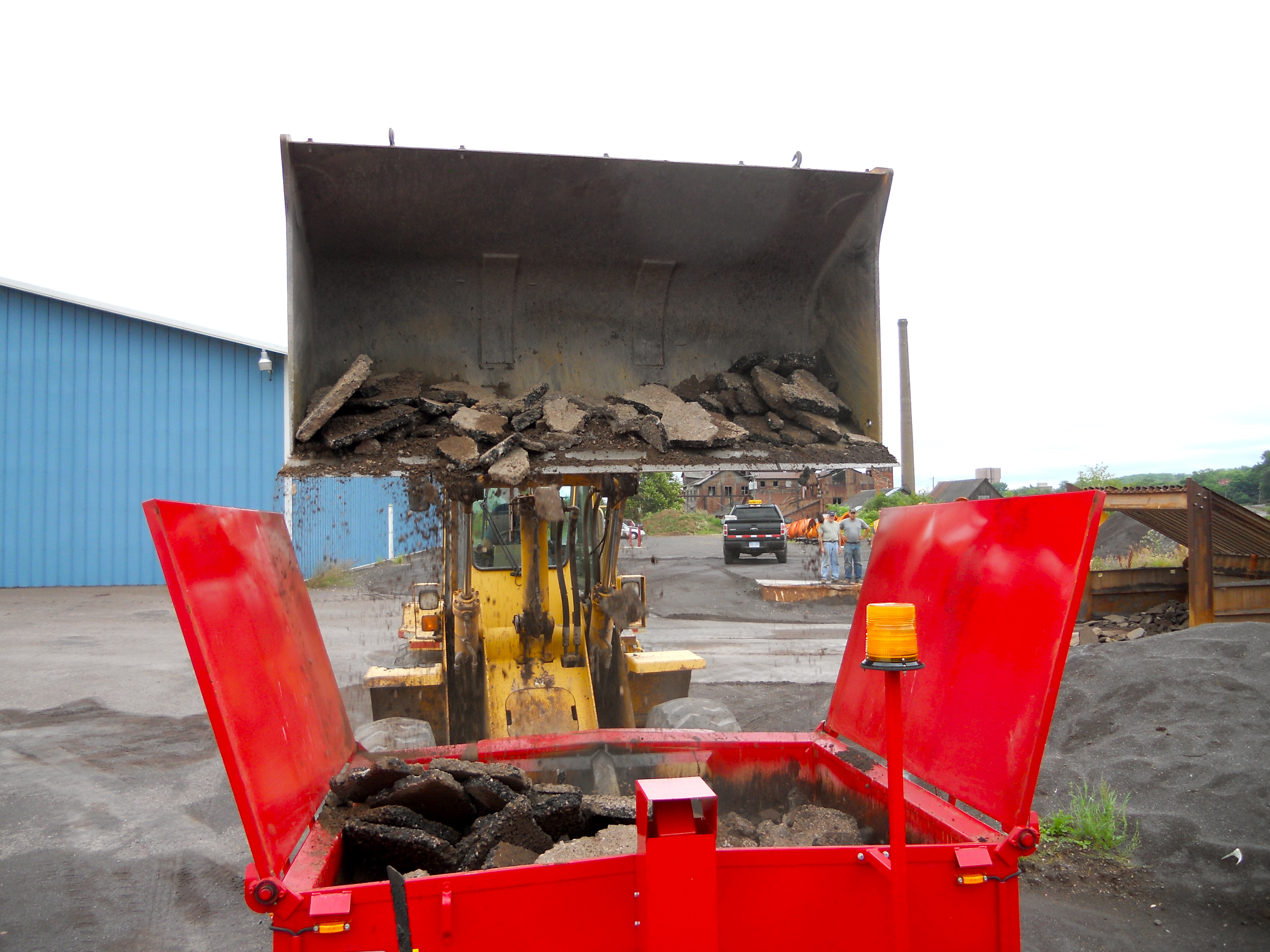
Chunks of Reclaimed Asphalt Pavement (RAP) are deposited for recycling.

Asphalt concrete is a recyclable material that can be reclaimed and reused both on-site and in asphalt plants. The most common recycled component in asphalt concrete is reclaimed asphalt pavement (RAP). RAP is recycled at a greater rate than any other material in the United States. Many roofing shingles also contain asphalt, and asphalt concrete mixes may contain reclaimed asphalt shingles (RAS). Research has demonstrated that RAP and RAS can replace the need for up to 100% of the virgin aggregate and asphalt binder in a mix, but this percentage is typically lower due to regulatory requirements and performance concerns. In 2019, new asphalt pavement mixtures produced in the United States contained, on average, 21.1% RAP and 0.2% RAS.

=== Recycling methods ===
Recycled asphalt components may be reclaimed and transported to an asphalt plant for processing and use in new pavements, or the entire recycling process may be conducted in-place. While in-place recycling typically occurs on roadways and is specific to RAP, recycling in asphalt plants may utilize RAP, RAS, or both. In 2019, an estimated 97.0 million tons of RAP and 1.1 million tons of RAS were accepted by asphalt plants in the United States.

Recycled asphalt being poured and mixed for use

RAP is typically received by plants after being milled on-site, but pavements may also be ripped out in larger sections and crushed in the plant. RAP millings are typically stockpiled at plants before being incorporated into new asphalt mixes. Prior to mixing, stockpiled millings may be dried and any that have agglomerated in storage may have to be crushed.

RAS may be received by asphalt plants as post-manufacturer waste directly from shingle factories, or they may be received as post-consumer waste at the end of their service life. Processing of RAS includes grinding the shingles and sieving the grinds to remove oversized particles. The grinds may also be screened with a magnetic sieve to remove nails and other metal debris. The ground RAS is then dried, and the asphalt cement binder can be extracted. For further information on RAS processing, performance, and associated health and safety concerns, see Asphalt Shingles.

In-place recycling methods allow roadways to be rehabilitated by reclaiming the existing pavement, remixing, and repaving on-site. In-place recycling techniques include rubblizing, hot in-place recycling, cold in-place recycling, and full-depth reclamation. For further information on in-place methods, see Road Surface.

=== Performance ===
Workers lay recycled asphalt

During its service life, the asphalt cement binder, which makes up about 5–6% of a typical asphalt concrete mix, naturally hardens and becomes stiffer. This aging process primarily occurs due to oxidation, evaporation, exudation, and physical hardening. For this reason, asphalt mixes containing RAP and RAS are prone to exhibiting lower workability and increased susceptibility to fatigue cracking. These issues are avoidable if the recycled components are apportioned correctly in the mix. Practicing proper storage and handling, such as by keeping RAP stockpiles out of damp areas or direct sunlight, is also important in avoiding quality issues. The binder aging process may also produce some beneficial attributes, such as by contributing to higher levels of rutting resistance in asphalts containing RAP and RAS.

One approach to balancing the performance aspects of RAP and RAS is to combine the recycled components with virgin aggregate and virgin asphalt binder. This approach can be effective when the recycled content in the mix is relatively low, and has a tendency to work more effectively with soft virgin binders. A 2020 study found that the addition of 5% RAS to a mix with a soft, low-grade virgin binder significantly increased the mix's rutting resistance while maintaining adequate fatigue cracking resistance.

In mixes with higher recycled content, the addition of virgin binder becomes less effective, and rejuvenators may be used. Rejuvenators are additives that restore the physical and chemical properties of the aged binder. When conventional mixing methods are used in asphalt plants, the upper limit for RAP content before rejuvenators become necessary has been estimated at 50%. Research has demonstrated that the use of rejuvenators at optimal doses can allow for mixes with 100% recycled components to meet the performance requirements of conventional asphalt concrete.

=== Other recycled materials in asphalt concrete ===
Beyond RAP and RAS, a range of waste materials can be re-used in place of virgin aggregate, or as rejuvenators. Crumb rubber, generated from recycled tires, has been demonstrated to improve the fatigue resistance and flexural strength of asphalt mixes that contain RAP. In California, legislative mandates require the Department of Transportation to incorporate crumb rubber into asphalt paving materials. Other recycled materials that are actively included in asphalt concrete mixes across the United States include steel slag, blast furnace slag, and cellulose fibers.

Further research has been conducted to discover new forms of waste that may be recycled into asphalt mixes. A 2020 study conducted in Melbourne, Australia presented a range of strategies for incorporating waste materials into asphalt concrete. The strategies presented in the study include the use of plastics, particularly high-density polyethylene, in asphalt binders, and the use of glass, brick, ceramic, and marble quarry waste in place of traditional aggregate.

Rejuvenators may also be produced from recycled materials, including waste engine oil, waste vegetable oil, and waste vegetable grease.

Recently, discarded face masks have been incorporated into stone mastic.

== See also ==
- Free floating screed – Part of a paving machine that spreads and smooths paving material
- Pavement engineering
- Marshall Stability Method
- Paver – Construction equipment used to lay asphalt
- Plastic armour – British World War II stone aggregate ship armour
- Road surface – Road covered with durable surface material
- Sealcoat – Protective coating for asphalt surfaces
- Stamped asphalt – Decorative finish on asphalt concrete
