= Edward de Smedt =

American inventor

Edward Joseph de Smedt was a Belgian-American inventor of asphalt concrete.

De Smedt developed his asphalt paving material in 1870 at Columbia University and filed the patents for "Improvement in laying asphalfc or concrete pavements or roads" (US 103581, US 103582), protecting a process of surfacing a packed sand road with one or more layers of premixed, heated asphalt and sand, in a ratio of 1:5, and rolling. The second patent covering a means to harden the surface through the application of a petroleum oil mixed with natural solidified asphalt (Albertite), of the Ritchie Mineral & Resin Oil Company, of West Virginia. His first sheet of asphalt pavement was laid down on 29 July 1870, on William Street in Newark, New Jersey. This trial used natural bitumen from West Virginia and was not very successful. An improved material containing bitumen from Pitch Lake in Trinidad and Val-de-Travers in Switzerland, was used later in New York City and on Pennsylvania Avenue in Washington, DC. Swiss Val-de-Travers asphalt having been used for decades in the US, as well as Europe, to surface sidewalks, the first in the US being laid in Philadelphia, in 1838, and combined with Macadam aggregates to also surface roads in France and England, from the 1850s.
