= Rubblization =

Construction and engineering technique

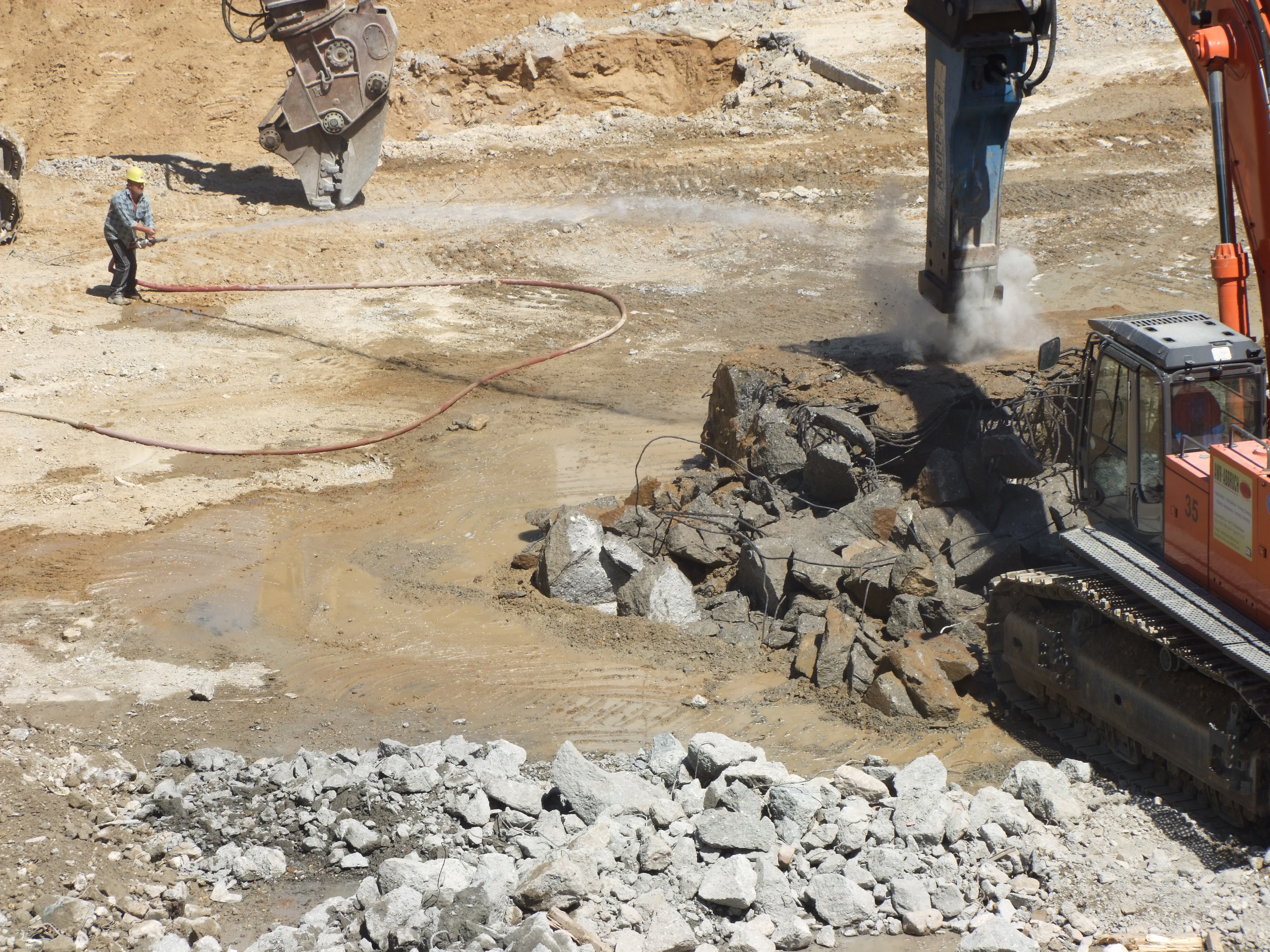
A hydraulic breaker creating concrete rubble

Rubblization is a construction and engineering technique that involves saving time and transportation costs by reducing existing concrete into rubble at its current location rather than hauling it to another location. Rubblization has two primary applications: creating a base for new roadways and decommissioning nuclear power plants.

== Road construction ==
In road construction, a worn-out concrete (Portland cement concrete) roadway can be rubblized and then overlaid with a new surface, usually asphalt concrete. Specialized equipment breaks the old roadway into small pieces to make a base for new pavement. This saves the expense of transporting the old pavement to a disposal site, and purchasing and transporting new base materials for the replacement paving. The result is a smoother pavement surface than would be obtained if a layer of asphalt were to be applied to the unbroken concrete surface. The technique has been used on roads since the late 1990s, and is also being used for concrete airport runways.

The rubblizing process provides many benefits versus other methods of road rehabilitation, such as crack and seat or removal and replacement of a concrete surface including: rubblizing a concrete surface is 52% less expensive than remove and replacing concrete; rubblizing reduces road reconstruction time from days of lane closures to hours, providing large savings to contractors and reduced impact on travelling public; and rubblization is an environmentally friendly "green" process.,

== Nuclear power plant decommissioning ==
Rubblization is used in decommissioning of nuclear power plants. As with other decommissioning techniques, all equipment from buildings is removed and the surfaces are decontaminated. The difference with rubblization is that above-grade structures, including the concrete containment building, are demolished into rubble and buried in the structure's foundation below ground. The site surface is then covered, regraded, and landscaped for unrestricted use. This saves the expense of removing and transporting the building pieces to a different site.
