= Liftoff! =

1989 space race board game

Liftoff! is a board game published by Task Force Games in 1989 that simulates the international space race to land astronauts on the Moon during the mid-20th century.

== Description ==
Liftoff! is a four-player game in which players direct the space programs of the U.S., the Soviet Union, a European consortium and an unnamed Asian country. Each player attempts to turn their space program budget — which fluctuates due to successes and failures as well as public opinion and event cards — into a successful space program.

The first step, set in the 1950s, is to use research and development (R&D) to launch a safe rocket that places a satellite in orbit. Players then progress through the historical sequence of test programs — Mercury/Vostok, Gemini/ Voskhod, Apollo/Soyuz. During the game, each director must make decisions about mission details, for example, what type of lunar lander to develop, or what type of hardware and what type of orbit to use to get from Earth to the Moon. Each director must also decide on the pace of development. As critic Rony Reichhardt noted, "In most cases, the prudent thing to do is to go slowly and invest in the research that improves your chance of succeeding. But you can rush your missions if you want; it simply costs more money and reduces your safety margins."

There are also optional rules for espionage, diplomacy, rescues, and bartering with opponents.

The first player to successfully negotiate all of the test missions, land astronauts on the Moon and return them safely to Earth is the winner.

== Publication history ==
Liftoff! was created by Fritz Bronner and was published by Task Force Games with artwork by Ken Hodges, Gary A. Kalin, and Todd Winter. The game was released at Origins Game Fair 1989, but did not find an audience, and by January 1990, copies were being offered for sale at a deep discount. The game quickly disappeared, and Task Force Games showed no interest in picking up an option to buy the rights from Bronner.

Later in 1990, Bronner recruited a 22-year-old programmer, Michael McCarty, and together they redeveloped the board game into an MS-DOS video game. Astronaut Buzz Aldrin became a consultant, and the game was released in 1993 as Buzz Aldrin's Race into Space.

== Reception ==
In Issue 13 of the British magazine Games International, Mike Siggins was not sure what to make of the game when he first opened the box: "Although the materials are workable and reasonably well designed, there are very few of them and they lie forlornly at the bottom of the box. The map is one of the smallest I’ve seen, the cards depicting the hardware and astronauts are rather flimsy and the record sheets could be clearer." However, when Siggins started to play the game, he was pleasantly surprised, writing, "The system is cleverly designed and if the subject interests you there is a real sense of achievement at the end of a mission." Siggins concluded by giving the game a high rating of 8 out of 10, writing, "I know deep down that it is not going to appeal to everyone, yet there is definitely something there that triggered my interest. I suppose it is best described as a game in which to participate rather than play, like being involved in an unfolding story."

In Final Frontier: The Magazine of Space Exploration, Tony Reichhardt felt that the game succeeded for the most part in translating the space program to a game board. However, he compared the level of complexity to that of a monster board wargame, and warned "Liftoff! does require an investment of time and concentration." However, Reichhardt noted that "once play begins, Liftoff! makes for an absorbing time." He concluded, "It all rings true, in more ways than one. Despite all the strategizing, a lot of times it seems to come down to a roll of the dice. Which, come to think of it, is probably the way NASA managers feel sometimes."

In Issue 13 of The Escapist, Allen Varney called the game system "innovative, balanced and highly replayable, but complex and extremely hard to win." He concluded, "You face the same choices the United States and the USSR faced, and in making decisions you start to understand why history played out as it did."
