= Burn Burn =

Burn Burn may refer to:

- "Burn Burn" (song), a song by Lostprophets
- Burn Burn (album), an album by Our Lady Peace
