= Burns Township =

Burns Township may refer to:

== Canada ==
- Burns Township, Ontario, now part of Madawaska Valley

== United States ==
- Burns Township, Henry County, Illinois
- Burns Township, Michigan
- Burns Township, Anoka County, Minnesota, now the city of Nowthen
