= Asphalt plant =

Plant used for the manufacture of forms of coated roadstone

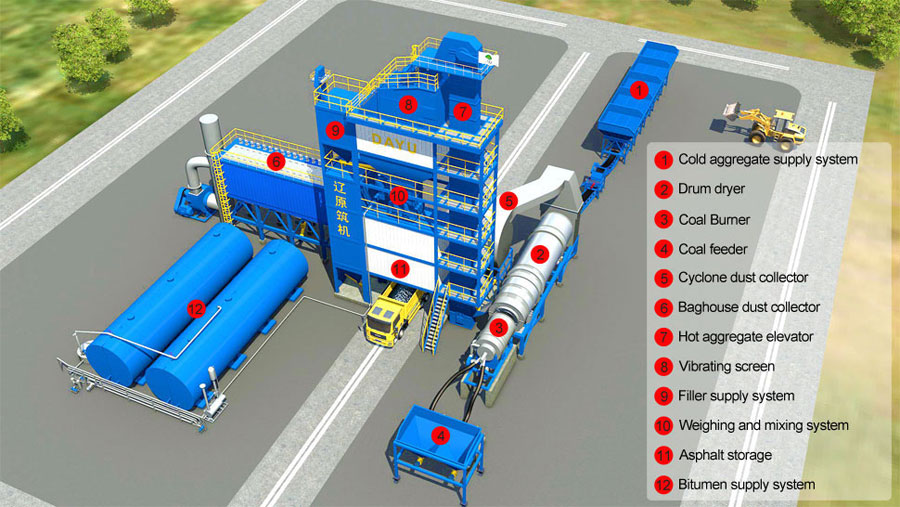
An asphalt plant or asphalt mixing plant is a structure which mixes aggregates and bitumen into asphalt at the required temperature. They are widely used for the construction of highways, city roads and parking lots.

An asphalt plant is a plant used for the manufacture of asphalt, macadam and other forms of coated roadstone, sometimes collectively known as blacktop or asphalt concrete.

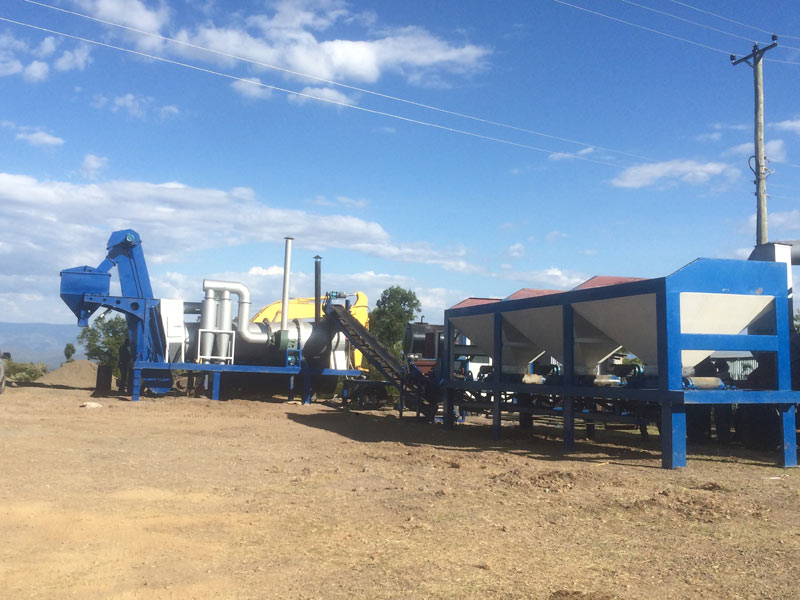
Asphalt plants for road construction

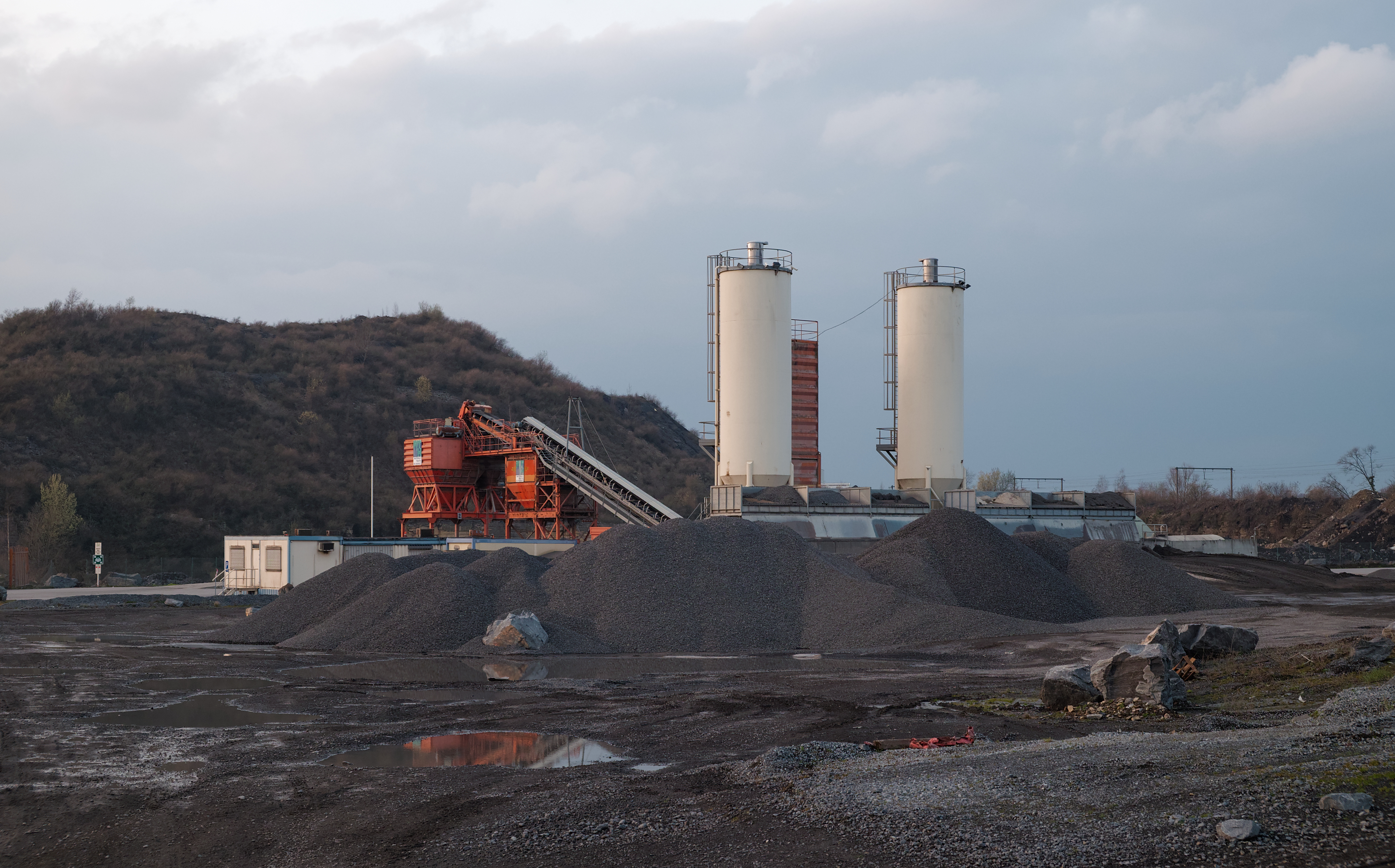
Asphalt plant in Belgium

The manufacture of coated roadstone demands the combination of a number of aggregates, sand and a filler (such as stone dust). These materials are then heated and coated with a binder, usually bitumen or tar, however tar was removed from BS4987 (the British Standard for Coated Macadam) in 2001 and is not referred to in BSEN 13108/1 (the British/European Material Specifications of Asphalt Concrete). The temperature of the finished product must be sufficient to be workable after transport to the final destination. A temperature in the range of 100 to 200 degrees Celsius is normal.

Countries have individual specifications stipulating how much of the raw material may be obtained from recycled asphalt. In-depth research shows that the addition of up to 20% recycled asphalt produces the same quality of asphalt as 100% virgin material. The quality of asphalt starts decreasing once the percentage of recycled asphalt increases beyond 20%.

== Main Structure ==
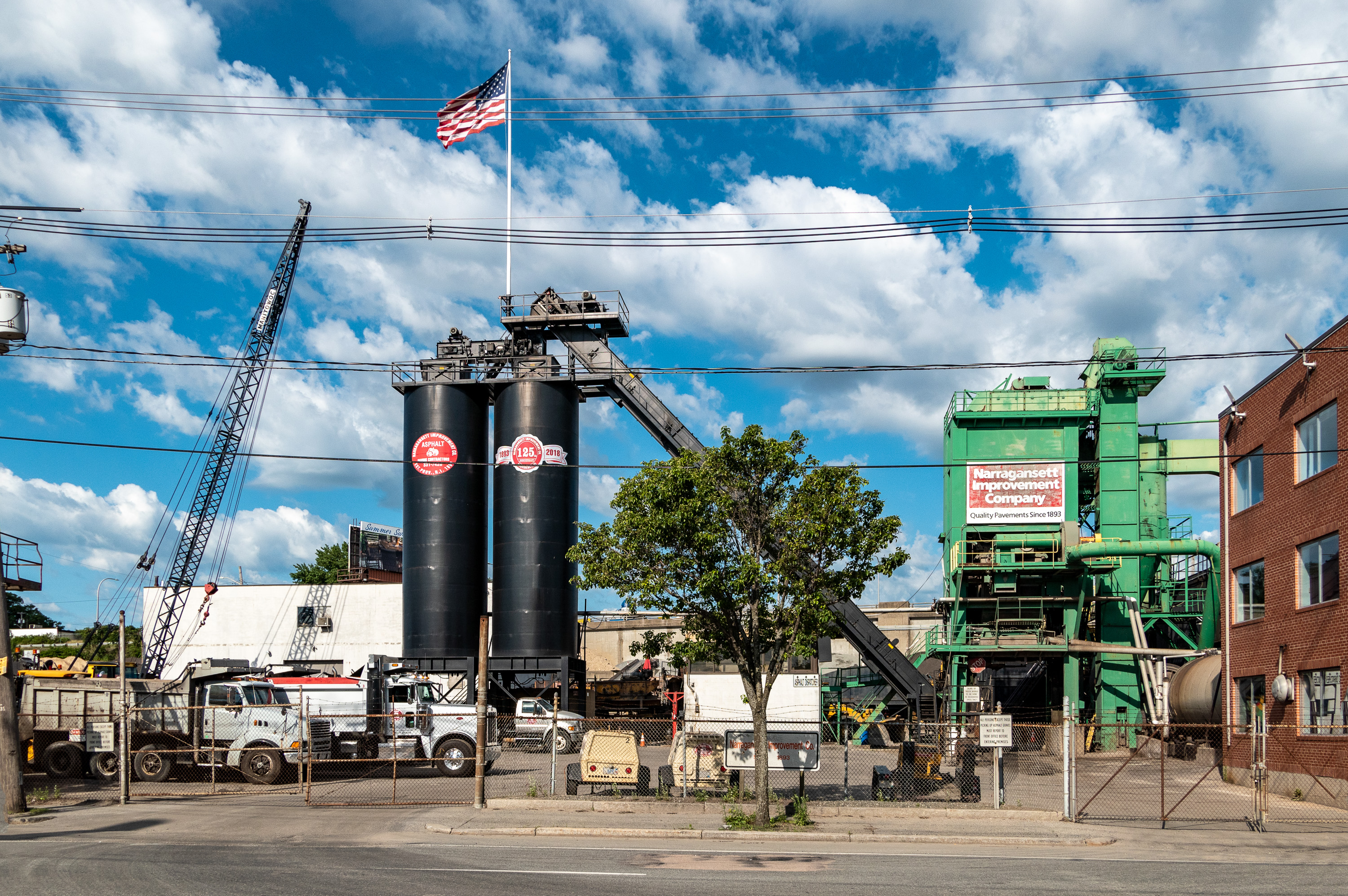
Asphalt plant in Rhode Island, USA

The asphalt plant is mainly composed of a cold aggregate supply system, drum dryer, coal burner, coal feeder, dust collector, hot aggregate elevator, vibrating screen, filler supply system, weighing and mixing system, Pollution Control Unit, asphalt storage, and bitumen supply system. All these components have characteristics that impact not only the overall quality of the asphalt but also the plant's effect on the environment.
