= Burnsville =

Burnsville may refer to:

Canada

- Burnsville, New Brunswick

United States

- Burnsville, Indiana
- Burnsville, Minnesota
  - Burnsville High School
- Burnsville, Mississippi
- Burnsville, North Carolina, in Yancey County
- Burnsville, Anson County, North Carolina
- Burnsville, West Virginia
- Burnsville, Pennsylvania
