= USS W. W. Burns =

Schooner

History

United States
- Name: USS W. W. Burns
- Namesake: Previous name retained
- Acquired: 13 August 1861
- Fate: Unknown
- Notes: Acquired for use as blockship

General characteristics
- Type: Schooner
- Sail plan: Schooner-rigged

USS W. W. Burns was a schooner acquired by the United States Navy in 1861.

W. W. Burns was a wooden-hulled Chesapeake Bay schooner acquired by the U.S. Navy on 13 August 1861 at Baltimore, Maryland for use as stone-laden blockship during the American Civil War. The purchase of W. W. Burns was one of 22 made at Baltimore in the summer of 1861, and she and the other 21 ships were slated to be loaded with stone, taken to the North Carolina coast, and sunk as blockships off the entrances to the major inlets leading to Albemarle Sound, Pamlico Sound, and Okracoke Sound. The venture was the first of the "stone fleet" projects undertaken by the U.S. Navy during the Civil War, but, due to delays and other problems, it failed.

Some of the 22 ships seem to have remained at their anchorages in Hampton Roads, Virginia, and deteriorated late that summer and into the autumn of 1861. The ultimate fate of W. W. Burns is unrecorded.
