= Burnin' (Gil Grand album) =

Studio album by Gil Grand
- Released: November 19, 2002
- Genre: Country
- Length: 38:58
- Label: Royalty
- Producers: Jason Barry; Richard Hutt

Gil Grand chronology
Famous First Words (1998)	Burnin' (2002)	Somebody's Someone (2006)

Burnin' is the second studio album by Canadian country music singer/songwriter Gil Grand. It was released on November 19, 2002 by Royalty Records. Seven singles were released from the album, including "Break It to Them Gently," originally recorded by Burton Cummings in 1978.

Much of the album was recorded at Cedartree studio in Kitchener, Ontario, overseen by producers Jason Barry and Rick Hutt. They received nominations for Producer of the Year at the Canadian Country Music Awards for this work.

== Track listing ==
1. "There She Goes" (Odie Blackmon, Gil Grand) - 2:45
2. "Burnin'" (Grand, Byron Hill) - 3:06
3. "Break It to Them Gently" (Burton Cummings) - 4:27
4. "Cry a Little" (Blackmon, Grand) - 3:14
5. "Never Comin' Down" (Grand, John Reynolds) - 3:34
6. "On Again, Off Again" (Austin Cunningham, Grand) - 3:23
7. "Nice and Slow" (Grand) - 3:03
8. "Trouble's Arms" (Cunningham, Grand) - 4:16
9. "Run" (Ryan Reynolds) - 3:49
10. "Sometimes She Cries" (Blackmon, Grand) - 3:29
11. "Any Minute Now" (Steve Fox, Grand) - 3:43
