= Cheeses... (album) =

2003 compilation album by Five Iron Frenzy

Compilation album by Five Iron Frenzy
- Released: April 22, 2003
- Recorded: 1996–2000
- Studio: Various
- Genre: Christian ska
- Length: 55:59
- Label: Five Minute Walk/EMI
- Producer: Frank Tate

Five Iron Frenzy chronology
Five Iron Frenzy 2: Electric Boogaloo (2001)	Cheeses... (2003)	The End Is Near (2003)

Professional ratings
Review scores
Source	Rating
AllMusic	3/5 stars
Christianity Today	(not rated)
Real Magazine	(not rated)
Jesus Freak Hideout	4/5 stars
Cross Rhythms	(not rated)

Cheeses... (of Nazareth) is the first compilation album by Five Iron Frenzy released in 2003. It contains a number of rarities and live tracks as a thank you to fans; the band would break up at the end of 2003. When it was announced that this album would be made, the band asked fans to call a provided phone number and leave suggestions for what the album should contain.

The original album name was "Cheeses of Nazareth", but the band decided it might be considered sacrilegious, so it was shortened to "Cheeses...". The title is based on a joke circulating on the Internet with a punchline of Cheeses of Nazareth. The album's interior contains a map of the U.S. showing a reference to the cheeses of Nazareth, Pennsylvania.

The album mainly appealed to the group's dedicated fan base. However, it managed to chart on both the Billboard heatseekers and contemporary Christian chart in the US.

== Track listing ==
No.	Title	Length
1.	"Kamikaze"	2:56
2.	"Rhubarb Pie" (original lyrics of the song Ugly Day)	3:36
3.	"Marty"	4:14
4.	"Fistful of Sand" (live)	4:10
5.	"Four Kids in Memphis"	0:33
6.	"Mind for Treason"	2:18
7.	"Cool Enough for You" (demo version)	3:41
8.	"3rd World Think Tank" (demo version)	3:35
9.	"Old West" (demo version)	2:52
10.	"Burn"	3:34
11.	"Left"	3:40
12.	"Never Ask Us to Play This"	0:35
13.	"Dog Food"	2:07
14.	"When I See Her Face"	0:55
15.	"Abraham Lincoln Beard (First Movement)"	0:23
16.	"Praise the Lord"	1:25
17.	"Give Me Back My Sandwich"	0:04
18.	"Omnivores for Mediocrity"	0:44
19.	"That Tastes Horrible"	0:27
20.	"No Grandma = Know Grandma"	0:12
21.	"Stinky Hippy"	0:29
22.	"Abraham Lincoln Beard (Second Movement)"	0:22
23.	"It's So Hot (I'm Gonna Have a Heat Stroke)"	1:18
24.	"Thea and the Singing Telegram"	2:42
25.	"How's About Some Milk?"	0:15
26.	"Donkey Basketball"	0:07
27.	"Screams in the Night"	1:49
28.	"Pootermobile"	0:07
29.	"Abraham Lincoln Beard (Third Movement)"	0:22
30.	"Mayonnaise Taco Monday"	0:32
31.	"Chew Water"	1:07
32.	"Metal Rules!"	1:41
33.	"Five Iron Is Stupid"	2:38
34.	"hidden track" (Reese doing vocal warmups)	0:29

== Personnel ==
Five Iron Frenzy

- Leanor "Jeff the Girl" Ortega – saxophone
- Dennis Culp – trombone
- Keith Hoerig – bass guitar
- Sonnie Johnston – guitar
- Scott Kerr – guitar
- Micah Ortega – guitar
- Reese Roper – "vocals", liner notes
- Andrew "Chaka" Verdecchio – drums
- Nathanael "Brad" Dunham - trumpet

Additional personnel

- Melinda Culp – photography
- Aaron James – package design
- Masaki Liu – engineer, mastering, mixing
- Frank Tate – executive producer

== The Second Coming of Cheeses... ==
The Second Coming of Cheeses...

Compilation album by Five Iron Frenzy
- Released: 2014
- Recorded: Various
- Length: 30:27
- Label: Five Iron Frenzy

At an unspecified date in 2014 another collection of rarities titled The Second Coming of Cheeses... was quietly released as a digital exclusive sold to fans who had donated to Five Iron Frenzy's 2012 Kickstarter campaign, though any person with the web link can purchase the album. No liner notes exist identifying the origins of each song as was included with the original Cheeses... collection, but like that collection it is mostly joke or gimmicky songs, this time recorded following the band's 2012 reunion. The songs included all have a better quality of recording then many of the songs from the original Cheeses... and also includes Kickstarter reward songs to fans who had donated $400 to the campaign.

No.	Title	Length
1.	"Three Frenz!" (iMovie song "Yearbook Long" with lyrics)	0:39
2.	"Bacon!" (A rock/country western song about bacon)	1:50
3.	"So Much Fun!" (A pop-punk style song about having fun)	0:48
4.	"I Can't Stop Schlopping!" (A blues song with non-sense lyrics and the only song in the collection with horns)	0:46
5.	"Happy Birthday!" (A moody electronic dance song)	1:16
6.	"Robots Are Fun!" (An acoustic guitar and electronic song about children and robots)	3:00
7.	"My Apartment is Made Out of Ham!" (A gangsta rap style song with nonsense lyrics)	0:40
8.	"El Pollo!" (A metalcore song)	0:43
9.	"To Astoria!" (A modern style sea shanty with sincere lyrics)	2:24
10.	"Saturday Morning!" (A jazz piano number with nonsense lyrics)	1:50
11.	"I Will Destroy!" (A heavy metal song about winning every type of game)	1:26
12.	"Insulin!" (A gangsta rap style song about diabetes, containing specific, scientific language)	3:26
13.	"Trombone in the Face!" (A gothabilly style song)	1:14
14.	"Moist!" (A pop-punk style song about various Kickstarter contributors and a dislike of the word "moist")	1:37
15.	"Don't You Know!" (A love song in the style of Brave Saint Saturn with sincere lyrics, acoustic instrumentation, and electronic breakdowns)	3:01
16.	"Chanallanawannamarran!" (A ska song (without horns) featuring various singing voices and child-like lyrics)	1:28
17.	"Melnychenkin!" (A gangsta rap style song with nonsense lyrics)	3:03
18.	"The Best Song That Daniel St Claire Has Ever Heard!" (A reggae song about a Kickstarter contributor)	1:17
