= Burning Star =

Burning Star may refer to:

- Burning Star (album), an album by Helstar
- "Burning Star" (song), a song by Belgian singer Natalia and American singer Anastacia
- Sampoornesh Babu a Tamil film actor known as Burning Star Sampoornesh Babu

== See also ==
- Jack Starr's Burning Starr, an American heavy metal band
