= Flame lift-off =

Condition in oil-fired pressure jet burners

Flame lift-off in oil fired pressure jet burners is an unwanted condition in which the flame and burner become separated. This condition is most commonly created by excessive combustion air and often results in the loss of flame as the photoelectric cell fails to register the light of the flame, this in turn results in a safety lockout of the control box.

== Other outcomes ==
Other outcomes may be experienced: –

1. There may be delayed ignition as the oil spray is too far forward for the electrodes to ignite, only when the oil spray has filled the combustion chamber will the mixture ignite. In this condition it is likely that the excessive volume of unburnt oil will ignite with explosive ignition.
2. The oil mixture will fail to ignite resulting in safety lockout of the control box.
3. The oil mixture will ignite but may burn very inefficiently due to excessive air chilling of the oil particles to the point where complete combustion of the oil is not possible.

== Flame lift-off height ==
A non-premixed jet flame has a tendency to lift off from the burner nozzle position when the jet velocity of the flame is over a critical value of $U_c$. With the increasing of the jet velocity, the lifted height will increase and when it's beyond certain critical height and the flame will be blown off. Therefore, the stability of the lifted flame is an important parameter for basic combustor design. Scholefield and Garside's theory claimed that the transition to turbulence is a prerequisite for the lifted diffusion flame stabilisation and the flame anchors at a point where the flow is turbulent. Gollahalli argued that the flame will tend to stable at the position where the local flow velocity balance the normal flame propagation velocity. Navarro-Martinez and Kronenburg have demonstrated that the excessive turbulent stretching at the nozzle leads to the lift-off and they also claimed that auto-ignition can be used to promote the flame stabilisation mechanism. Recently the observation from Kiran and Mishra's visual experiment proved the flame lift-off height varies linearly with jet exit velocity. They presented a semi-empirical correlation between the normalized lift-off height to the nozzle exit diameter.

$\frac{H_L}{D_f}=1.8*10^{-3}*\frac{U_f}{D_f}$

Where, $H_L$: lift-off height

$D_f$:diameter of the fuel tube

$U_f$:fuel jet velocity

In addition to the velocity effect, The stoichiometric burning on the physical mechanism blowout has been investigated by Broadwell et al. and Pitts. According to their study on diffusion flame, the fresh air entrained by the vortices structure cools down and over dilutes the flame jet, which leads to the flame extinction.
