= Air for Free =

Studio album by Relient K
- Released: July 22, 2016
- Genre: Alternative rock; pop rock; Christian rock; Christian alternative rock
- Length: 59:16
- Label: Mono vs Stereo
- Producer: Mark Lee Townsend

Relient K chronology
Collapsible Lung (2013)	Air for Free (2016)

Singles from Air for Free
- 1. "Bummin'" Released: April 13, 2016

Air for Free is the eighth studio album by Relient K, released on July 22, 2016, through Mono vs Stereo. The album's lead single, "Bummin'", was released on April 13, 2016. It is the first album since Five Score and Seven Years Ago (2007) to feature drummer Dave Douglas, though he is not credited as an official member. It also features the return of producer Mark Lee Townsend following his absence on Collapsible Lung (2013).

== Background ==
In November 2015, Matt Thiessen confirmed that a new record had been completed, with a planned release for 2016. They worked with Mark Lee Townsend again, who produced the album. Townsend also provided additional guitars, vocals and bass. Dave Douglas also returned to the band to play drums on the record, though was never credited as an official member. Douglas played drums on half the record, as the other half was done by Tom Breyfogle, who also played bass for the band live.

The album is described as their "most eclectic" record they've ever released, which Thiessen said was not done on purpose. He stated, "We spent a long time working on the record, so I guess a lot of different songs came out. To that end, I felt like they all grouped together to go on this thing. That's cool that you think they all work together like that." Thiessen said at the beginning of working on album, they tried to create a "guitar heavy, up-tempo rock record," however, feeling like it wasn't right, they abandoned the idea. He then played the songs he had for the album on piano and showed guitarist Matt Hoopes and proceeded from there. The album's title was thought of by Thiessen, who was trying to rhyme words from the song "Slide" by Goo Goo Dolls.

== Release and promotion ==
Pre-orders for Air for Free began on April 13, 2016. That same day, the album's lead single "Bummin'" was released. The album art was also revealed, depicting Thiessen and Hoopes overlooking a sunny field. On June 21, the group streamed the song "Mrs. Hippopotamuses" from the album, via YouTube. A week before its official release, the album was streamed in its entirety on Pandora Radio. On September 1, the group released a music video for "Mountaintop".

In support of the album, Relient K played an album-release show in their home state of Ohio on July 23, 2016, with Cardboard Kids opening, and later embarked on the Looking for America Tour with Switchfoot. The tour ran from September 16, beginning in Denver, Colorado, through November 26, concluding in San Francisco, California. The group embarked on a second tour with Switchfoot, the Still Looking For America 2our covering Western U.S. and Canada, beginning on January 21, 2017.

== Critical reception ==
Professional ratings
Review scores
Source	Rating
CCM Magazine	5/5 stars
CM Addict	4.5/5 stars
Jesus Freak Hideout	4.5/5 stars 5/5 stars
Jesus Wired	94%

The album was met with critical acclaim. Writing for Jesus Freak Hideout, Michael Weaver states, "Air for Free could be described as what Collapsible Lung should've been"; in a similar vein, Cortney Warner declares that the album "proves the band is far from 'has been' status, and continues to create fresh, thoughtful music that anyone can enjoy." In his review for CM Addict, Michael Tackett says, "Air for Free is lyrically and musically a welcome return to form for Relient K." Writing for AllMusic, Neil Z. Yeung called the album a "lush and joyful affair" featuring a "sunny, creative blend of indie rock and contemporary pop." Matt Collar of CCM Magazine said, "Matt Thiessen and company have built a passionate fan base on their ability to combine the vibrant and vulnerable into one cohesive package. Air For Free takes this platform and expands it musically and thematically." Jason Tate of Chorus.fm wrote, "This feels like it moves them forward musically, they tried things, they went for it... and even when I don't think it works I am impressed. The production is on par with Forget and Not Slow Down, a little muddle a few places, but not distracting, and in other places really great – the instruments shine and glean and it's full of intentionality and purpose." Joshua Olson of Indie Vision Music remarked, "If you put Relient K's music from 2000-2009 in a time capsule, let it age, and opened it up in 2016 the result would be Air For Free. Despite the varied nature of the songs, they all seem to fit into one cohesive unit."

== Commercial performance ==
Air for Free debuted at its peak of No. 44 on the Billboard 200 and also No. 1 album on the Top Christian Albums Chart, selling 9,000 copies in its opening week.

== Track listing ==
Digital and CD edition
No.	Title	Length
0.	"Untitled" (piano version of "Marigold"; only on CD release of album, hidden in pregap)	1:08
1.	"Bummin'"	3:07
2.	"Local Construction"	3:18
3.	"Mrs. Hippopotamuses'"	2:37
4.	"Cat"	2:44
5.	"Man"	4:20
6.	"Air for Free"	3:03
7.	"God"	4:19
8.	"Elephant Parade"	3:50
9.	"Mountaintop"	3:38
10.	"Sleepin'"	3:49
11.	"Empty House"	3:22
12.	"Flower"	4:09
13.	"Marigold"	3:47
14.	"Runnin'"	5:36
15.	"Prodigal"	2:24
16.	"Heartache"	5:13
Total length:		59:16

Vinyl edition

Side A
No.	Title	Length
1.	"Local Construction"	3:18
2.	"Bummin'"	3:07
3.	"Marigold"	3:47
4.	"Runnin'"	5:36
Total length:		15:48

Side B
No.	Title	Length
5.	"Mrs. Hippopotamuses'"	2:37
6.	"Cat"	2:44
7.	"Elephant Parade"	3:50
8.	"Man"	4:20
Total length:		13:31

Side C
No.	Title	Length
9.	"Air for Free"	3:03
10.	"God"	4:19
11.	"Prodigal"	2:24
12.	"Empty House"	3:22
Total length:		13:08

Side D
No.	Title	Length
13.	"Mountaintop"	3:38
14.	"Sleepin'"	3:49
15.	"Flower"	4:09
16.	"Heartache"	5:13
Total length:		16:49

== Personnel ==
Credits adapted from the album's liner notes.

Relient K

- Matt Thiessen – vocals, acoustic piano, programming, guitars, ukulele, trumpet
- Matt Hoopes – keyboards, guitars, Omnichord, trumpet, Boss HC-2 percussion synth, backing vocals

Additional musicians

- Mark Lee Townsend – guitars, bass, backing vocals
- Bill Mitchell – additional guitars
- Dave Douglas – drums, backing vocals
- Tom Breyfogle – drums, percussion
- Roger Bissell – trombone
- Brandon Calderon – trombone
- Jake Germany – Boss HC-2, additional backing vocals
- AJ Babcock – additional backing vocals
- Austin Cunningham – additional backing vocals
- Tiffany Fernandez – additional backing vocals
- Lisa Goe – additional backing vocals
- Billy Raffoul – additional backing vocals

Production

- Mark Lee Townsend – producer, recording, mixing (6, 11)
- Brandon Calderon – recording assistant
- Seth Morton – recording assistant
- Steve Marcantonio – mixing (1–5, 7–10, 12–16)
- Tom Breyfogle – editing
- David A. Terry – mastering
- Jake Germany – art direction, design
- Josh Ness – photography
- Brandon McGowan – graphics
- Dawn Hepp – management
- Kevin Spellman – management

== Charts ==
Chart performance for Air for Free
Chart (2016)	Peak position
Australian Albums (ARIA)	72
New Zealand Heatseekers Albums (RMNZ)	6
UK Independent Albums (OCC)	20
US Billboard 200	44
US Christian Albums (Billboard)	1
US Top Alternative Albums (Billboard)	3
US Top Rock Albums (Billboard)	6
US Independent Albums (Billboard)	5

== Release history ==
Region	Date	Format(s)	Label	Ref(s).
United States	July 22, 2016	Digital download; vinyl	Mono vs Stereo	
United States	August 20, 2016	CD	Mono vs Stereo	
