= That's My Jam (song) =

Single by Relient K featuring Owl City

from the album Collapsible Lung
- Released: July 2, 2013
- Length: 2:43
- Label: Mono vs Stereo
- Songwriters: Matt Thiessen; Matt Hoopes; Brian Lee; Sam Hollander
- Producers: Adam Young; Emily Wright; Brian Lee

Relient K singles chronology
"Therapy" (2009)	"That's My Jam" (2013)	"Look on Up" (2016)

Owl City singles chronology
"Cactus in the Valley" (2013)	"That's My Jam" (2013)	"Beautiful Times" (2014)

Music video
- "That's My Jam" on YouTube

"That's My Jam" is a song by American Christian rock band Relient K. It was released on July 2, 2013, as the lead single and bonus track from their seventh studio album Collapsible Lung. The song features Adam Young of Owl City, who co-produced the track.

== Background ==
"That's My Jam" was first released on February 4, 2013, with a lyric video being uploaded to YouTube. This version does not feature Owl City and was originally used in a Pizza Hut commercial. After announcing the release date for Collapsible Lung, those who pre-ordered the album would receive a free download of a re-recorded version of "That's My Jam". This version features Adam Young of Owl City and was released on May 29, 2013. The song was officially released as a single on July 2, after premiering on USA Today.

Thiessen had previously worked with Young for his Owl City album Ocean Eyes, providing additional vocals and production. Young agreed to do a collaboration for a Relient K song after Thiessen brought up the idea to him. Thiessen said of the collaboration, "it's cool to have it go the other way around."

== Composition ==
"That's My Jam" was written by Matt Thiessen, Matt Hoopes, Brian Lee and Sam Hollander, while production was handled by Adam Young, Emily Wright and Lee. The song is an ode to the '90s, referencing names such as Smashing Pumpkins, Britney Spears, U2, Boyz II Men and Blessid Union of Souls.

== Critical reception ==
Jesus Freak Hideout wrote on the song, "there are glimmers of Thiessen's signature wit" and described it as an "entertaining bonus track."

== Personnel ==
Credits for "That's My Jam" adapted from album's liner notes.

Relient K

- Matt Thiessen – vocals, acoustic piano, synthesizers, keyboards, guitars
- Matt Hoopes – guitars, backing vocals
- Jon Schneck – guitars, backing vocals
- John Warne – bass guitar, backing vocals
- Ethan Luck – drums, percussion

Additional musicians

- Adam Young – featured artist, vocals

Production

- Adam Young – producer
- Emily Wright – producer
- Brian Lee – producer

== Charts ==
Chart performance for "That's My Jam"
Chart (2013)	Peak position
US Christian Digital Song Sales (Billboard)	8

== Release history ==
Release history for "That's My Jam"
Region	Date	Format	Label	Ref.
Various	July 2, 2013	Digital download	Mono vs Stereo	
