= Deck the Halls, Bruise Your Hand =

Studio album by Relient K
- Released: November 4, 2003
- Recorded: 2003
- Genres: Christmas; rock
- Length: 27:03
- Label: Gotee
- Producer: Mark Lee Townsend

Relient K chronology
The Vinyl Countdown (2003)	Deck the Halls, Bruise Your Hand (2003)	Mmhmm (2004)

Singles from Deck the Halls, Bruise Your Hand
- 1. "I Celebrate the Day" Released: November 14, 2003

Deck the Halls, Bruise Your Hand is the first Christmas album released by Christian rock band Relient K. It was released on November 4, 2003, via Gotee Records.

== Background and release ==
Deck the Halls, Bruise Your Hand was produced by Mark Lee Townsend and co-produced by Matt Thiessen. It was released as a combo pack with later copies of their previous full-length album, Two Lefts Don't Make a Right...but Three Do. "I Celebrate the Day" was released on November 14, 2003, as the first and only single from the album.

On October 23, 2007, the band re-released this album with seven new songs, and the new title of Let it Snow, Baby... Let it Reindeer. Guitarist Matt Hoopes reflected on the album, stating, "On the first batch of songs, we mostly tried to keep it... really fast, loud and a little bit off for Christmas songs."

On the 20th anniversary of the album, the group pressed it as a vinyl record.

== Critical reception ==
Professional ratings
Review scores
Source	Rating
Cross Rhythms	8/10 squares
Jesus Freak Hideout	5/5 stars
Punknews.org	3/5 stars

Deck the Halls, Bruise Your Hand was met with positive reviews from music critics. Tony Cummings of Cross Rhythms wrote, "Apart from having the most amusing title ever conceived for a Christmas project, what do you get? Well, just what you'd expect. A punktastic versions of "Angels We Have Heard On High", a fun modification of a creaking old standard 'Santa Clause Is Thumbin' To Town' and best of all, a hilarious version of '12 Days Of Christmas'. But it doesn't stop there. There's also a truly manic version of Handel's 'The Hallelujah Chorus' and if Matthew Thiessen's run through of 'Silent Night/Away In A Manger' is dull, with not a guitar in earshot, this is still an above average Yuletide album likely to get airplay in the Christmases ahead." Josh Taylor of Jesus Freak Hideout stated, "But Relient K shows that they can write a Christmas song or two, too. From a hitchhiking Santa Claus to a Christmas breakup and finally a celebration of Christ's birth, this album has it all covered [...] This is truly a masterpiece and should be enjoyed for many Christmases to come."

== Track listing ==
All tracks public domain unless otherwise noted. New verses on tracks 3 and 6 written by Matt Thiessen.

No.	Title	Writer(s)	Length
1.	"Angels We Have Heard on High"	Edward Shippen Barnes	1:53
2.	"Deck the Halls"	Thomas Oliphant	1:20
3.	"12 Days of Christmas"	Frederic Austin	3:30
4.	"Silent Night / Away in a Manger"	Joseph Mohr, Franz Xaver Gruber/William J. Kirkpatrick, James Ramsey Murray	2:18
5.	"I Celebrate the Day"	Matt Thiessen	3:18
6.	"We Wish You a Merry Christmas"	Unknown	2:18
7.	"Santa Claus Is Thumbing to Town"	Thiessen	2:47
8.	"Handel's Messiah (The Hallelujah Chorus)"	George Frideric Handel	1:09
9.	"I Hate Christmas Parties" (performed by Matthew Thiessen and the Earthquakes)	Thiessen	4:34
10.	"Auld Lang Syne"	Robert Burns	1:59
Total length:			27:03

== Personnel ==
Credits adapted from album's liner notes.

Relient K

- Matt Thiessen – lead vocals, guitars, acoustic piano
- Matt Hoopes – guitars, backing vocals
- Brian Pittman – bass
- Dave Douglas – drums, backing vocals

Production

- Mark Lee Townsend – producer
- Matt Thiessen – co-producer
- J.R. McNeeley – mixing
