= Let It Snow, Baby... Let It Reindeer =

Studio album by Relient K
- Released: October 23, 2007
- Recorded: 2007
- Studios: Dark Horse Studios (Franklin, TN); S-S-Studio (Spring Hill, TN)
- Genres: Christmas; Christian rock; pop punk; alternative rock
- Length: 48:15
- Label: Gotee
- Producers: Mark Lee Townsend; Matt Thiessen

Relient K chronology
Must Have Done Something Right EP (2007)	Let It Snow, Baby... Let It Reindeer (2007)	The Bird and the Bee Sides (2008)

Let It Snow, Baby... Let It Reindeer is the second Christmas album by Christian rock band Relient K. It was released on October 23, 2007, and was produced by Mark Lee Townsend and Matt Thiessen. The album peaked at No. 96 on the Billboard 200.

== Release ==
On August 22, 2007, Let It Snow, Baby... Let It Reindeer was announced for released in two months' time. It was released on October 23, 2007. "Christmas comes around every year, so you might as well put the record out every year," Matt Thiessen said of the release. The album is a re-release of the band's Christmas EP, Deck the Halls, Bruise Your Hand, but with seven new songs and some other changes, such as track listing and a new ending to one song. The album was produced by Mark Lee Townsend and Matt Thiessen. Guitarist Matt Hoopes said the album features a variety of influences, such as the "jazzy, '50s, dancy kind of feel" on "Sleigh Ride", while other tracks are more rock.

"Silver Bells" was posted on the group's Myspace account on November 7, 2008. A re-issue of the album was released on iTunes on November 18, 2008. It included Relient K's renditions of "Silver Bells", "God Rest Ye Merry Gentlemen", and "O Holy Night", as well as a music video for the band's version of "Sleigh Ride". The songs were eventually pulled from iTunes, but have since then been added to Gotee's 2010 Christmas compilation CD: 'Tis The Season To Be Gotee.

The band's video for "Sleigh Ride" was released on November 10, 2008, made by Funny Pages Productions and directed by Rob Corley and Tom Bancroft. It is an animated video, and the band had mentioned in recent years that they always wanted to do an animated video. It features all of the band members as rabbits in winter. The Matt Thiessen rabbit fails to get the attention of a girl rabbit, which leads the other four band members to steal Santa's sleigh so that he can impress her. After the two take off in the sleigh, Santa tries to get it back by using a giant snowman. After some close calls, the other band members build a snowwoman to draw the snowman off. In the end, they give Santa his sleigh back, and the Ethan Luck rabbit sneaks a present from Santa's sleigh for Matt to give to the girl rabbit.

In August 2014, the group announced a vinyl release for Let It Snow, Baby... Let It Reindeer.

== Critical reception ==
Professional ratings
Review scores
Source	Rating
AllMusic	3/5 stars
Alternative Addiction	3.5/5 stars
IGN	7.2/10
Jesus Freak Hideout	4/5 stars
Sputnikmusic	3.5/5 stars

The album was met with positive reviews from music critics. Andrew Leahey of AllMusic stated, "it's still nice to hear the difference a few years can make, as Relient K has aged rather quickly (and rather well) since the group's previous Christmas offering [...] a solid record for returning fans, and a harmlessly appealing listen for everyone else." Alternative Addiction said the album "is a welcome release into the world of Christmas music. Around this year there's a plethora of meaningless music releases; best of collections, B-sides discs, and the Christmas album. But Relient K's album actually has a little merit, mostly due to the musical talents of the band and due to the vocal talent of lead-man Matt Thiessen." Chad Grischow of IGN wrote, "Though it is a bit uneven, Relient K's second go at a Christmas album has more than enough to enjoy. It would be a bit more interesting if they did not play it so safe on the newer covers of classics and if they stripped some of the flabby piano ballad originals, but Christmas and a little extra padding go well together." John DiBiase of Jesus Freak Hideout remarked, "Relient K approaches Christmas from just about every angle for a well-rounded celebration. Being a little rusty in its compilation, Let It Snow, Baby... Let It Reindeer feels just a bit askew (perhaps approaching the project with the new tracks plus acoustic renditions of some of their past recordings may have helped pull it together as an all-new concept), but still manages to be the Christmas rock album of the decade and all-around one of the better modern Christmas projects you can find today." Sputnikmusic described the album as "a very diverse record because it manages to capture all the elements of Christmas." AltSounds called the record, "an excellent Christmas album," highlighting "Silent Night/Away In A Manger" as "the best" played piano medley.

== Track listing ==
All tracks not written by Matt Thiessen are public domain. New verses on tracks 6 and 11 written by Matt Thiessen.

Tracks 4, 5, 6, 7, 8, 11, 12, 13, 14 and 16 appeared originally on the 2003 release Deck the Halls, Bruise Your Hand. Track 9 originally on the Apathetic EP.

No.	Title	Writer(s)	Length
1.	"Have Yourself a Merry Little Christmas"	Hugh Martin, Ralph Blane	2:11
2.	"Sleigh Ride"	Leroy Anderson, Mitchell Parish	3:32
3.	"Merry Christmas, Here's to Many More"	Matt Thiessen	3:51
4.	"Angels We Have Heard on High"	Edward Shippen Barnes	1:55
5.	"Deck the Halls"	Thomas Oliphant	1:21
6.	"12 Days of Christmas"	Frederic Austin	3:33
7.	"Silent Night/Away in a Manger"	Joseph Mohr, Franz Xaver Gruber/William J. Kirkpatrick, James Ramsey Murray	2:18
8.	"I Celebrate the Day"	Thiessen	3:17
9.	"In Like a Lion (Always Winter)"	Thiessen	3:44
10.	"I'm Getting Nuttin' for Christmas"	Sid Tepper, Roy C. Bennett	1:39
11.	"We Wish You a Merry Christmas"	Unknown	2:12
12.	"Santa Claus Is Thumbing to Town"	Thiessen	2:43
13.	"Handel's Messiah"	George Frideric Handel	1:09
14.	"I Hate Christmas Parties" (performed by Matthew Thiessen and the Earthquakes)	Thiessen	4:34
15.	"Boxing Day"	Thiessen	3:37
16.	"Auld Lang Syne"	Robert Burns	2:53
17.	"Good King Wenceslas" (hidden track)	John Mason Neale, Thomas Helmore	3:17
Total length:			48:15

2008 iTunes re-release bonus tracks
No.	Title	Length
1.	"Silver Bells"	3:04
2.	"God Rest Ye Merry Gentlemen"	2:05
3.	"O Holy Night"	2:34

== Personnel ==
Credits adapted from album's liner notes.

Relient K

- Matt Thiessen – lead vocals, rhythm guitar, piano
- Matt Hoopes – lead guitar, backing vocals
- Brian Pittman – bass (2003 tracks only)
- Dave Douglas – drums, backing vocals (all tracks except 2008 re-release tracks)
- John Warne – bass, backing vocals (2007 and 2008 tracks only)
- Jon Schneck – rhythm guitar, backing vocals (2007 and 2008 tracks only)
- Ethan Luck – drums (2008 re-release tracks only)

Additional production

- Mark Lee Townsend – producer, engineering (4–8, 11–14, 16–17)
- Matt Thiessen – producer, engineering (1–3, 9, 10, 15)
- J.R. McNeely – mixing at ELM Studio South (Nashville, TN)
- Benjamin Terry – assistant mixing
- Rebekah Shnell – photography
- Davy Baysinger (formerly of Bleach) – artwork

== Charts ==
=== Weekly charts ===
Weekly chart performance for Let It Snow, Baby... Let It Reindeer
Chart (2007)	Peak position
US Billboard 200	96
US Top Alternative Albums (Billboard)	17
US Top Christian Albums (Billboard)	5
US Holiday Albums (Billboard)	8
US Top Rock Albums (Billboard)	24

=== Year-end charts ===
Year-end chart performance for Let It Snow, Baby... Let It Reindeer
Chart (2008)	Position
US Christian Albums (Billboard)	28
