= Is for Karaoke =

Studio album by Relient K
- Released: October 4, 2011
- Studio: Dark Horse Studio (Franklin, TN); S-S-Studio (Spring Hill, TN)
- Genre: Alternative rock
- Length: 50:31
- Label: Mono vs Stereo; Gotee
- Producer: Mark Lee Townsend; Matt Thiessen

Relient K chronology
Forget and Not Slow Down (2009)	Is for Karaoke (2011)	Collapsible Lung (2013)

Is for Karaoke (also known as Relient K Is for Karaoke) is a 2011 cover album by American rock band Relient K. The first seven songs were released on June 28, as Is for Karaoke EP, and on October 4, the remaining songs were released as Is for Karaoke Pt. 2 EP, concurrently with the full-length album.

== Background ==
The group began posting pictures on their Facebook to reveal tracks from a forthcoming covers EP. On June 14, 2011, Alternative Press reported the EP would be called Is for Karaoke and displayed the album artwork. The first part, Is for Karaoke EP, was made available for download on June 28. According to guitarist Matt Hoopes, the group always wanted to do a cover album, as they've performed cover songs in their concerts in the past. The seven track EP sees the band covering a wide variety of music ranging from the '80s such as "Girls Just Want To Have Fun", "Surf Wax America" and "Crazy", to the 2010s such as "Baby", which Hoopes said was intentional. Drummer Ethan Luck said the reasoning behind the group's decision to record a cover of "Baby" by Justin Bieber was because Hoopes has a daughter and it was her favorite song, which she wanted them to record.

In September 2011, the band announced a full-length release for Is for Karaoke. Expanded to 14 tracks, the full-length release sees the group covering songs from bands such as Third Eye Blind and Toto. On October 1, the band streamed Is for Karaoke EP, Part 2 on their MySpace page. On October 4, the second EP was officially released, along with the full-length album, Is for Karaoke, which features all the tracks from both EPs.

Is for Karaoke was produced by Mark Lee Townsend and Matt Thiessen. It was recorded at Dark Horse Studio in Franklin, Tennessee, and at S-S-Studio in Spring Hill, Tennessee.

== Critical reception ==
Professional ratings
Review scores
Source	Rating
AbsolutePunk	80%
AllMusic	3.5/5 stars
Cross Rhythms	7/10 squares
Jesus Freak Hideout	4/5 stars
Melodic	3/5 stars

The album was met with positive reviews from music critics. Matt Collar of AllMusic said the album was "melodic, eminently listenable recordings that make the most of the original song while never losing Relient K's own punk-pop sound." Graeme Crawford of Cross Rhythms stated, "the vocals on K Is for Karaoke's eclectic mix of songs are well handled by Matthew Thiessen, even if listeners may struggle with some of the song selections." Kaj Roth of Melodic wrote, "Some songs work out fine on K Is for Karaoke like 'Girls Just Want to Have Fun' (Cyndi Lauper), 'Baby' (Justin Bieber), 'You're the Inspiration' (Chicago), 'Crazy' (Gnarls Barkley), 'Here Comes My Girl' (Tom Petty) and 'Africa' (Toto) but their versions of 'The Distance' (Cake), 'Interstate Love Song' (Stone Temple Pilots), 'Doctor Worm' (They Might be Giants) and 'Inside of Love' (Nada Surf) are more or less quite anonymous and grey."

In his initial review for Is for Karaoke EP, Josh Taylor of Jesus Freak Hideout described it as "hit and miss, but its hits are much greater than its misses, which are slight and mostly excusable." However, after listening to the full-length version, he remarked, "As far as cover albums go, this one is about as good as they are going to come [...] The latter half just released is stronger than the first half, but the first half still has its gems. All together, these are fourteen tracks no Relient K fan should be without, and even if you never really hopped on the RK train- it's still a lot of fun." Mitch Emerick of Indie Vision Music noted, "Relient K did not stray to far from the originals but these songs are done with great precision and show off the skills of the band musically and vocally."

== Track listing ==
Full-length album
No.	Title	Writer(s)	Originally performed by	Length
1.	"Girls Just Want to Have Fun"	Robert Hazard	Cyndi Lauper	2:48
2.	"Baby"	Justin Bieber; Christopher "Tricky" Stewart; Terius "The-Dream" Nash; Christopher Bridges; Christina Milian	Justin Bieber	2:52
3.	"One Headlight"	Jakob Dylan	The Wallflowers	4:17
4.	"You're the Inspiration"	Peter Cetera, David Foster	Chicago	3:45
5.	"The Distance"	Greg Brown	Cake	2:54
6.	"Crazy"	Brian Burton; Thomas Callaway; Gian Franco Reverberi; Gian Piero Reverberi	Gnarls Barkley	2:53
7.	"Motorcycle Drive By"	Stephan Jenkins	Third Eye Blind	4:14
8.	"Doctor Worm"	They Might Be Giants	They Might Be Giants	3:03
9.	"Interstate Love Song"	Robert DeLeo, Scott Weiland	Stone Temple Pilots	3:38
10.	"Here Comes My Girl"	Tom Petty, Mike Campbell	Tom Petty and the Heartbreakers	4:05
11.	"Africa"	David Paich, Jeff Porcaro	Toto	4:57
12.	"Surf Wax America"	Rivers Cuomo, Patrick Wilson	Weezer	3:05
13.	"Inside of Love"	Matthew Caws, Ira Elliot, Daniel Lorca	Nada Surf	4:03
14.	"Everybody Wants to Rule the World"	Roland Orzabal; Ian Stanley; Chris Hughes	Tears for Fears	3:57
Total length:				50:31

Is for Karaoke - EP
No.	Title	Originally performed by	Length
1.	"Girls Just Want to Have Fun"	Cyndi Lauper	2:48
2.	"Here Comes My Girl"	Tom Petty & The Heartbreakers	4:05
3.	"Baby"	Justin Bieber	2:52
4.	"Doctor Worm"	They Might Be Giants	3:03
5.	"Crazy"	Gnarls Barkley	2:53
6.	"Everybody Wants to Rule the World"	Tears for Fears	3:57
7.	"Surf Wax America"	Weezer	3:05
Total length:			23:30

Is for Karaoke Pt. 2 - EP
No.	Title	Originally performed by	Length
1.	"One Headlight"	The Wallflowers	4:17
2.	"Africa"	Toto	4:57
3.	"The Distance"	Cake	2:54
4.	"You're the Inspiration"	Chicago	3:45
5.	"Interstate Love Song"	Stone Temple Pilots	3:38
6.	"Inside of Love"	Nada Surf	4:03
7.	"Motorcycle Drive By"	Third Eye Blind	4:14
Total length:			27:01

== Personnel ==
Credits adapted from AllMusic and album's liner notes.

Relient K

- Matt Thiessen – lead vocals, keys, trumpet, producer
- Matt Hoopes – guitar, vocals, trumpet
- John Warne – bass, vocals
- Ethan Luck – drums, vocals
- Jon Schneck – guitar, vocals

Additional musicians

- Mark Lee Townsend – guitar, vocals
- Justin York – guitar

Production

- Mark Lee Townsend – producer
- Dave Hagen – assistant editor
- JR McNeely – mixing
- Nathaniel Dantzler – mastering

== Charts ==
Chart performance for Is for Karaoke EP
Chart (2011)	Peak position
US Billboard 200	150
US Top Alternative Albums (Billboard)	23
US Christian Albums (Billboard)	4
US Top Rock Albums (Billboard)	40

Chart performance for Is for Karaoke, Part 2 EP
Chart (2011)	Peak position
US Christian Albums (Billboard)	26

Chart performance for Is for Karaoke
Chart (2011)	Peak position
US Christian Albums (Billboard)	35
