= Forget and Not Slow Down =

Studio album by Relient K
- Released: October 6, 2009
- Recorded: March 23–April 30, 2009
- Studios: Dark Horse Recording (Franklin, Tennessee); s-s Studio (Spring Hill, Tennessee).
- Genres: Alternative rock; rock
- Length: 42:44
- Labels: Mono vs Stereo; Jive
- Producers: Mark Lee Townsend; Matthew Thiessen

Relient K chronology
The Bird and the Bee Sides (2008)	Forget and Not Slow Down (2009)	Is for Karaoke (2011)

Singles from Forget and Not Slow Down
- 1. "Forget and Not Slow Down" Released: September 21, 2009; 2. "Therapy" Released: October 19, 2009

Forget and Not Slow Down is the sixth studio album by American rock band Relient K, released on October 6, 2009. It is the band's first album to feature Ethan Luck on drums, replacing longtime drummer Dave Douglas. The album is also the first Relient K album with Mono Vs Stereo and their only on Jive Records. The album was produced by Mark Lee Townsend and mixed by Andy Wallace.

== Background and recording ==
In early 2009, Relient K's vocalist Matt Thiessen, secluded himself from others and retreated to Winchester, Tennessee, where he began to write music for three months on an album to be released later in 2009. However, Thiessen stayed in contact with the other members sharing song ideas for the album. He also collaborated with Adam Young of Owl City on the song "Terminals". Though it does not appear on the standard edition of the album, it was released as an exclusive B-side.

About being isolated Thiessen stated it "was pretty appealing to me because I tend to cut out my social life when I write. I don't like to make plans during the day or for later or anything that can interrupt what I'm trying to do. I didn't really know where I was going to go, but a lot of things happened to work in a certain way." An influence for the record was the band's lead singer, Matt Thiessen, and his fiancée, Shannon, breaking up in late 2008, which has been regarded as a "break-up album." Thiessen said the overall message of the album is about staying positive.

Thiessen stated that they were keen on finishing the album for a 2009 release and had begun recording the new album with their "favorite" producer, Mark Lee Townsend and mixer Andy Wallace. Guitarist Matt Hoopes stated about Mark Lee Townsend that, "We've got an almost telepathic relationship." On March 23, 2009, the band started recording at Dark Horse Recording Studio in Franklin, Tennessee, which Hoopes states is his "favorite studio". The band had used the likes of synthesizers and MIDI before; but Thiessen stated that every instrument on this album "It's organic. I know a lot of bands do that now. But for us, it was really the first time we made it the real thing." On April 30, Thiessen posted that they were "Tracking drums for the last three songs. The new album is almost done!".

On May 5, 2009, the band announced via the Air 1 website that The Almost and Relient K were in the same studio and stated the band members were swapping gear to record both band's albums. With the bands in the studio together, Aaron Gillespie would record vocals for the album which was confirmed with the release of the track listing and the guest vocalists.

== Influences ==
Influences for the record are bands like Counting Crows and Foo Fighters. Matt Thiessen stated in an interview with Pollstar, "We definitely wanted to make a rock record. We wanted it to be uptempo and energetic. As far as the sonic aspect, we wanted to make it less modern sounding, with classic rock textures – Counting Crows, Foo Fighters, those kind of '90s albums. That was a good time for rock 'n' roll." He described its sound as melodic rock with up-tempo tracks and "a lot of tension notes," creating an "urgent sort of feel." Matt Hoopes has also stated "The songs that tend to be the fan favorites in the past are the ones about making mistakes but ultimately moving past them and this record has a lot of that feeling. No matter what trials you encounter in your life, it doesn't have to be the end of your story. You can move on and be happy and experience joy."

When Matt Thiessen sent a message to AbsolutePunk readers he stated "It's a bit weird because there are some untitled outros and intros throughout the album. Basically, if the track list skips a number, something is up. There are eleven songs, but the whole thing runs about 43 minutes." There is a hidden track before track 1. It is Thiessen's dad singing a line from Sahara.

== Promotion and release ==
In late March 2009, it was announced that the band had completed their contract with Gotee Records and would join the Mono vs Stereo label. On May 8, Thiessen announced on his Twitter account that the new album would be called Forget and Not Slow Down, which will also be the title of a song on the album. The following day, while at Glory at the Gardens at Busch Gardens Tampa Bay, they announced that the album should be released around October. In late May and early June, the band went on tour with Owl City, Runner Runner and the Classic Crime. Following this, they went on a short Northeast and Midwestern US tour in June and July 2009. On July 9, Gotee Records announced on Twitter that Forget and Not Slow Down is to be released on October 6, 2009, and provided a flyer via TwitPic. On August 4, the announcement of the album's completion was made via Thiessen's Twitter account which simply stated "Ding! Album's done."

On August 20, the track listing and cover art were released to AbsolutePunk.net, in addition to the information that the first single is the title track, and that it in fact had already been released to some Christian radio stations. When Thiessen released the track listing, he announced that the missing numbers on the track list are interludes. The interlude titles were posted on Gotee Records' pre-release page for the album. The cover art is an oil painting on canvas, by Linden Frederick, Matt Thiessen's uncle. On September 17, 2009, "Forget and Not Slow Down" was posted online. "Therapy" was posted online on October 1, before it was released to Hot Adult Contemporary radio stations on October 19, as the album's second single. Four webisodes were released weekly via the band's MySpace and Facebook pages, showing the recording progress in the studio. The album has also been released on vinyl record (pressed at United Record Pressing in Nashville, TN). The vinyl record itself was for sale on their tour with Paramore and fun. and is now offered on their webstore as a bundle package with a carrier bag and wooden case. In support of the album, the group embarked on A Three Hour tour in the fall of 2009, with Copeland and Barcelona. In November and December 2009, the band went on a US tour with TobyMac. In April and May 2010, the band supported Paramore on their headlining US tour; the trek included an appearance at The Bamboozle festival.

== Reception ==
Professional ratings
Review scores
Source	Rating
AbsolutePunk	90%
AllMusic	4/5 stars
BLARE Magazine	3.5/5 stars
Jesus Freak Hideout	4.5/5 stars
Melodic	4/5 stars
The Tune	3.7/5 stars

Forget and Not Slow Down was met with critical acclaim from music critics. Blake Solomon of AbsolutePunk called it a step up from their 2007 release Five Score and Seven Years Ago and stated, "Matt Thiessen has bounced back with the best choruses and most emotionally charged songs of his career. But what becomes most apparent during Forget and Not Slow Down is its cohesiveness, that indefinable feeling when everything is exactly where it should be. A first for the band, intros like 'Oasis' and outros like 'Flare' create brief moments of reflection before their counterparts continue the noble task of blowing us away." James Christopher Monger of AllMusic remarked, "Thiessen's penchant for machine-gun-fired torrents of both secular and non-secular self-discovery on top of impossibly catchy melodies makes for a remarkably upbeat listen, and the band's efficient, late-'90s alternative rock delivery feels far less stale than bands with a similar feel." Adam Dawson of Jesus Freak Hideout described the album as their "most mature" work to date, remarking they "have proven over the years that while they may have started off as a punk band, they are quite capable of maturing and diversifying. Forget And Not Slow Down is probably the best example of this. From start to finish, there are barely any flaws." Cor Jan Kat of Melodic wrote, "In past years Relient K was more of a punk pop band and were most of the songs full speed ahead and full of fun. Though these elements are still there the band has added a more mature sound and a change of style. We find a more rock based style with elements of folk rock that results in the best album of the band so far. The production was again in the capable hand of Mark Townsend. Thiessen penned again some insightful lyrics and his voice is better than ever." Brendan Manley of Alternative Press said "Musically, Forget keeps pace with Thiessen's inspired words. The performances are spot-on throughout, but what really impresses is the quality of the recording – a true headphone experience, Forget sounds flawless, thanks in part to the talents of producer Mark Townsend and engineer/mix-master Andy Wallace, as well as the band's obvious maturity as arrangers and players. The tones of the instruments, and the way they complement Thiessen's Ben Gibbard-esque vocals, are testament to Relient's considerable skill, six full-lengths later."

== Commercial performance ==
The album debuted at No. 15 on the Billboard 200, selling 33,000 copies in its first week. The album also reached No. 1 on the Top Christian Albums chart, No. 4 on the Top Alternative Albums chart and No. 5 on the Top Rock Albums chart.

== Awards and nominations ==
In 2010, the album was nominated for a Dove Award for Recorded Music Packaging of the Year at the 41st GMA Dove Awards.

== Track listing ==
All tracks are written by Matt Thiessen, except "Candlelight" composed by Thiessen and Matt Hoopes

No.	Title	Length
0.	Untitled (pregap hidden track)
1.	"Forget and Not Slow Down"	3:22
2.	"I Don't Need a Soul"	3:51
3.	"Candlelight"	3:21
4.	"Flare (Outro)"	1:00
5.	"Part of It"	3:20
6.	"(Outro)"	1:35
7.	"Therapy"	3:43
8.	"Over It"	3:54
9.	"Sahara"	3:49
10.	"Oasis (Intro)"	0:41
11.	"Savannah"	4:17
12.	"Baby (Outro)"	0:46
13.	"If You Believe Me"	3:20
14.	"This Is the End"	2:17
15.	"(If You Want It)"	3:18
Total length:		42:34

Amazon exclusive/Digital version
No.	Title	Length
16.	"Terminals" (programming and additional production by Adam Young of Owl City)	3:12
17.	"Where Do I Go From Here (Acoustic)"	2:55
Total length:		48:41

== Personnel ==
Credits adapted from album's liner notes.

Relient K

- Matthew Thiessen – vocals, acoustic piano, Rhodes piano, Wurlitzer electric piano, organ, electric guitar, nylon string guitar, trombone, steel drums, bells
- Matt Hoopes – acoustic guitar, electric guitar, Omnichord, backing vocals (11)
- Jon Schneck – electric guitar
- John Warne – bass, backing vocals
- Ethan Luck – electric guitar, drums, percussion, backing vocals (7)

Additional personnel

- Mark Lee Townsend – electric guitar, mandolin
- Christi Bissell – baritone saxophone (8), bassoon (8), clarinet (8)
- Laura Musten – strings (2, 14)
- Buffy Woessner – strings (2, 14)
- Chris Carmichael – strings (11, 14)
- Tim Skipper from House of Heroes – backing vocals (1, 9)
- Brian McSweeney – backing vocals (7)
- Aaron Gillespie from The Almost – backing vocals (9)
- Matt MacDonald from The Classic Crime – backing vocals (9, 13)
- Arnold Thiessen – backing vocals (9, 11)
- Jonathan Thiessen – backing vocals (11)

Production

- Matt Hoopes – executive producer
- Matt Thiessen – executive producer, producer, art direction
- Kevin Spellman – executive producer, management
- Mark Lee Townsend – producer, engineer
- Dave Hagen – assistant engineer, editing
- Andy Wallace – mixing at Soundtrack Studios (New York City, New York)
- Paul Suarez – mix assistant
- Sara Marienthal – A&R coordinator
- Mike Condo – production coordinator
- David Baysinger – art direction, design, layout
- Linden Frederick – art direction
- Cale Glendening – photography
- Ethan Luck – photography
- Ron Baysinger – hand writing

== Charts ==
Chart performance for Forget and Not Slow Down
Chart (2009)	Peak position
US Billboard 200	15
US Top Alternative Albums (Billboard)	4
US Top Christian Albums (Billboard)	1
US Top Rock Albums (Billboard)	5
