= Collapsed lung (disambiguation) =

Collapsed lung or pneumothorax is an accumulation of air in the chest causing the lung to separate from the chest wall.

Collapsed lung may also refer to:

- Atelectasis, collapse of the air-containing sacs of the lung
- Collapsed Lung (band), a British hip-hop band

== See also ==
- Flail chest, a condition sometimes producing and often confused with pneumothorax
- Collapsible Lung, an album by Relient K
