= Collapsible Lung =

Studio album by Relient K
- Released: July 2, 2013
- Genre: Alternative rock; pop rock
- Length: 35:37
- Label: Mono Vs Stereo
- Producer: Paul Moak; Aaron Sprinkle

Relient K chronology
Is for Karaoke (2011)	Collapsible Lung (2013)	Air for Free (2016)

Singles from Collapsible Lung
- 1. "That's My Jam" Released: July 2, 2013

Collapsible Lung is the seventh studio album by American rock band Relient K. It was released on July 2, 2013, via Mono vs Stereo. To date, it is their only album not to be produced or co-produced by Mark Lee Townsend.

== Background and production ==
In May 2012, the group posted that they were working on new material. Later that month, the group posted a studio video update, followed by another in early June. In July and August, the group went on a tour of the US with Hellogoodbye, William Beckett and House of Heroes. While on the tour, the group played a new track, entitled "Boomerang".

Matthew Thiessen described the album as being different from their other material, stating, "We made it a point to pull back all of our usual tricks in the recording process, and forced ourselves to determine how to present each song in the best and most concise way. It was a refreshing process, and we feel that much of that energy is transparent in the recording. We are incredibly proud of this record." He also stated that the album is more of a pop album because he felt that it needed to be written. He went on to say, "That being said, our next album will definitely be a rock record. Maybe even punk rock, who knows?"

The group decided to work with producers Paul Moak and Aaron Sprinkle, instead of Mark Lee Townsend on the album. They also worked with several songwriters including, Fernando Garibay, Ari Levine, Evan Bogart and Tim Pagnotta. According to the band, their goal was to make the album "be unpredictable" and took "an experimental approach." The album was mastered in January 2013.

== Release ==
On April 13, 2013, the group announced that bassist John Warne, guitarist Jon Schneck, drummer Ethan Luck would not be participating in their upcoming tour. On April 21, Luck announced his departure from the group. In April and May, the group went on a tour of the US with Hellogoodbye, William Beckett and Mike Mains & The Branches. Dan Gartley and Tom Breyfogle filled in on bass and drums, respectively. On April 28, Cross Rhythms reported that the group's new album would be titled Collapsible Lung and that its release was expected in July. On May 17, Relient K posted the album art, saying that the album would officially be released on July 2, 2013. On May 29, a lyric video was released for "Lost Boy". "That's My Jam" was also released for fans who pre-ordered the album. It was re-recorded from an earlier release in February, and features Owl City. On June 19, "PTL" was premiered through Alternative Press's website. On June 26, the title track was made available for streaming via AbsolutePunk.

Collapsible Lung was released on July 2 through independent label Mono vs Stereo. On the same day, a lyric video was released for the title-track. "That's My Jam" also premiered on USA Today as the lead single, and was included on the album as an iTunes bonus track. In July, the group embarked on a US tour with the Almost and the Rocketboys, which included three dates at Warped Tour. The name of the album comes from the title track "Collapsible Lung", which is the last song on the record. "Don't Blink" was released with a lyric video on YouTube. In November, the group went on a co-headlining US tour with Motion City Soundtrack. They were supported by Driver Friendly.

== Critical reception ==
Professional ratings
Review scores
Source	Rating
Alternative Press	2.5/5 stars
CCM Magazine	4/5 stars
Christian Music Zine	4.5/5 stars
CM Addict	2/5 stars
Consequence of Sound	2/5 stars
HM	2/5 stars
Jesus Freak Hideout	3.5/5 stars 3/5 stars
Louder Than the Music	5/5 stars
New Release Tuesday	3/5 stars
USA Today	2.5/4 stars

Collapsible Lung garnered mixed reception from music critics. At Louder Than the Music, Jono Davies called it an album "of such great quality" that, he wrote, "has a fresh feel to it with a modern rock sound". He went on to say that "the band have moved away from just writing energetic pop/punk songs, and instead have written an album that is creative, solid and mature, but at the same time not losing their great songwriting skills." At Christian Music Zine, Tyler Hess found the release to be "just an insanely fun pop album that will be one of my favorites of the year." At CCM Magazine, Andy Argyrakis wrote that the band "shakes up its pop/punk formula, while retaining its witty songwriting and welcome stream of sunny harmonies". He called the "resulting" album "a delectable batch of experimental modern pop that may surprise longtime listeners, but will surely have them joining the veterans for the positivity-laden party."

At USA Today, Brian Mansfield said "there's a newfound sadness, too, one that sometimes resembles wisdom." Jesus Freak Hideout's Roger Gelwicks commented that "at the very least, Collapsible Lung is a daring collection and will retain a sundry of reputations", and stated that the album is a welcome "experiment that keeps the band's fans on their toes, doing more right than wrong in the process." In addition, Cortney Warner of Jesus Freak Hideout wrote that "Collapsible Lung continues to solidify the confusion" because it is "almost too inconsistent, and at times it can feel more like a B-side album rather than a collective LP." Sarah Fine of New Release Tuesday called the album "a noticeable departure" because it lacked in moral wisdom that was a hallmark of their past works.

At Alternative Press, Scott Heisel felt that "now we're left with Collapsible Lung, the dreadfully plastic yang to Forget's emotional, powerful yin." Randall Colburn of Consequence of Sound wrote that the album is "frontloaded with generic dance-pop tracks", and evoked that the release is "weighted down by a parade of faceless women, many of whom are reduced to mere sexual objects, resulting in a record that reeks of adolescent rebellion at best and pandering at worst." CM Addict's Kevin Thorson said that the album's "inconsistencies and poor lyrics are things you would expect from possibly a debut artist not from seasoned veterans", and because of this wrote that "Relient K can do much better." At HM, Dan Macintosh commented that the album "makes it difficult to be entirely on Thiessen's side", and that "it's also two giant steps back in the credibility column."

Reflecting on the album and its reception, guitarist Matt Hoopes stated, "It does seem like a lot of our fans, even from the initial scowling toward it, have really warmed up to it overall." Thiessen also added that they "wanted to upset people and surprise people, try hard in some places and really not try at all in other places [...] It was an experiment."

== Track listing ==
Standard edition
No.	Title	Writer(s)	Length
1.	"Don't Blink"	Matthew Thiessen, Matthew Hoopes	3:02
2.	"Boomerang"	Thiessen, Evan Bogart, Ari Levine	2:47
3.	"Lost Boy"	Thiessen, Derek A.E. Fuhrmann, Matt Musto, Gregg Wattenberg	3:10
4.	"If I Could Take You Home"	Thiessen, Hoopes, Fernando Garibay	3:32
5.	"Can't Complain"	Thiessen, Brian Lee, Emily Wright	3:14
6.	"Gloria"	Thiessen, Hoopes, Levine, Tim Pagnotta	2:58
7.	"PTL"	Thiessen, Musto, Caleb Owens	3:24
8.	"Disaster"	Thiessen	2:58
9.	"When You Were My Baby"	Thiessen, Hoopes, Owens	2:44
10.	"Sweeter" (featuring Caleb Owens)	Thiessen, Owens	4:27
11.	"Collapsible Lung"	Thiessen, Hoopes	3:21
Total length:			35:37

iTunes bonus track
No.	Title	Writer(s)	Length
12.	"That's My Jam" (featuring Owl City)	Thiessen, Hoopes, Lee, Sam Hollander	2:43
Total length:			38:20

== Personnel ==
Credits adapted from album's liner notes.

Relient K

- Matt Thiessen – vocals, acoustic piano, synthesizers, keyboards, guitars
- Matt Hoopes – guitars, backing vocals
- Jon Schneck – guitars, banjo, bells, Omnichord, Nord, backing vocals
- John Warne – bass guitar, backing vocals
- Ethan Luck – drums, percussion

Additional personnel

- Lane Johnson – additional programming (1, 4)
- Sadler J. Vaden – electric guitar (5)
- Caleb Owens – additional guitars (9), additional vocals (9)
- Adam Gardner – bass (5)
- Jon Radford – drums (5)
- Tim Skipper – backing vocals (2)

Production

- Paul Moak – producer and engineer (1, 2, 4, 6, 8, 9, 10)
- Aaron Sprinkle – producer and engineer (3, 5, 7, 11)
- Justin March – assistant engineer
- Devin Vaughan – assistant engineer
- Dewey Boyd – assistant
- Tom Breyfogle – pre-production assistance
- Nathan Thomas – pre-production assistance
- J.R. McNeely – mixing
- Brad Blackwood – mastering
- Lani Crump – production coordination
- Dave Steunebrink – production coordination
- Ryan Besch – design, illustration

== Charts ==
Chart performance for Collapsible Lung
Chart (2013)	Peak position
US Billboard 200	16
US Top Alternative Albums (Billboard)	3
US Christian Albums (Billboard)	2
US Top Rock Albums (Billboard)	4
