= Philmore =

American Christian rock band

- Origin: Tulsa, OK, United States, Garner Iowa
- Genres: Alternative rock, Christian rock
- Years active: 1998–2005
- Labels: Five Minute Walk
- Members: Justin Greiman; Kayle Greiman
- Past members: Brett Schoneman; Sean Donnelly

Philmore was a Christian rock band that formed in Tulsa, Oklahoma in the late 1990s, and was active until 2005. The band's original lineup consisted of brothers Justin (lead guitar and vocals) and Kayle Greiman (bass) with drummer Brett Schoneman.

== Career ==
Philmore's self-titled debut album was released on Five Minute Walk Records in June 2000, featuring the track "Our Finest Hour", and a cover of Bon Jovi's "Living on a Prayer". The inside cover features a photograph of the band wearing mirror sunglasses and jeans with holes in them.

Philmore were heavily influenced by MXPX, and their music combined punk rock with a 1980s edge of pop and glam metal. Justin Greiman's vocals were unusually high for a male vocalist, leading to comparisons with "Weird Al" Yankovic.

Philmore toured the United States extensively after the release of their first album, touring with Relient K, Bleach, Holland in the Back to the Few Tour and Watashi Wa, among others.

In July 2002, their second album, The Bare Truth About Philmore, was released. This album was somewhat softer-edged than the first, and at the same time, was not explicitly Christian. They continued touring, but their popularity began to decrease. Schoneman left the band in 2001 and became a realtor in Iowa, and was replaced by Sean Donnelly in 2003. The band made a third CD in April 2005 called Demolition, then went dormant after Donnelly left the band in August 2005.

Justin Greiman owns a photography company, while Kayle is now a fireman.

== Discography ==
- Live with No Audience (1998)
- Philmore (2000)
- The Bare Truth About Philmore (2002)
- Demolition (2005)
