= Chasing Victory =

American post-hardcore band

- Origin: Camilla, Georgia
- Genres: Post-hardcore, alternative rock
- Years active: 2001–2007, 2008, 2014, 2016-present
- Label: Mono vs Stereo
- Members: Adam Harrell; Michael Lamb; Jason Lowery; Jeremy Lowery; Chris Cargile; Chris "Crutch" Crutchfield
- Past members: Matt Grogan; Taylor Sullivan

Chasing Victory is an American post-hardcore band from Camilla, Georgia.

== Band-history ==
The band was formed in 2001 by vocalist Adam Harrell, guitarist Jason Lowery, drummer Jeremy Lowery, bassist Taylor Sullivan, and guitarist Michael Lamb while they were in high school. They started as a cover band called Bailey Drive, where they started writing songs for their debut EP A Not So Tragic Cover Up. After the release of this EP, they signed with Mono vs. Stereo and released their first full-length album, I Call This Abandonment, in 2005, followed by their second album, Fiends, in 2007.

Between March and May 2007, the band went on a US tour with See You Next Tuesday, August Burns Red, and From a Second Story Window. On September 24, 2007, the band announced they had broken up through their Myspace blog. In 2008, they played a few shows during the summer. In 2010, Harrell and the Lowerys announced the formation of a new band called Astoria and released a six-song EP called [E.P.(ic) - EP].

In January 2014, vocalist Adam Harrell announced that he and his wife were planning on adopting a child and that Chasing Victory would be reuniting for one show in the near future to help raise money for the adoption. The show was a success, and the Harrells adopted their new daughter shortly after.

In 2016, the band announced their reformation with the release of a new song entitled "She Haunts Me" on Halloween, and the band played several shows throughout the Southeast US in the summer of 2017.

The band released a new independent EP entitled Friends, Volume 1 in early 2018.

== Band members ==
=== Current members ===
- Adam Harrell - vocals
- Michael Lamb - guitar
- Jason Lowery - guitar
- Jeremy Lowery - drums
- Chris Cargile - guitar
- Chris "Crutch" Crutchfield - bass

=== Former members ===
- Matt Grogan - bass
- Taylor Sullivan - bass

== Discography ==
Studio albums

- I Call This Abandonment, 2005
- Fiends, 2007

=== EPs ===
- A Not So Tragic Cover Up, 2004
- Friends, Volume 1, 2018

=== Music videos ===
- "Unrequited Love" (I Call This Abandonment), 2005
- "The Night Your Guardian Fell Asleep" (I Call This Abandonment), 2005
- "Wolves" (Fiends), 2007

== Gear ==
- Chasing Victory played Fender and Gibson guitars and SJC drums.
- They were endorsed by Gibson and Peavey.
