= Relient K =

American alternative rock band

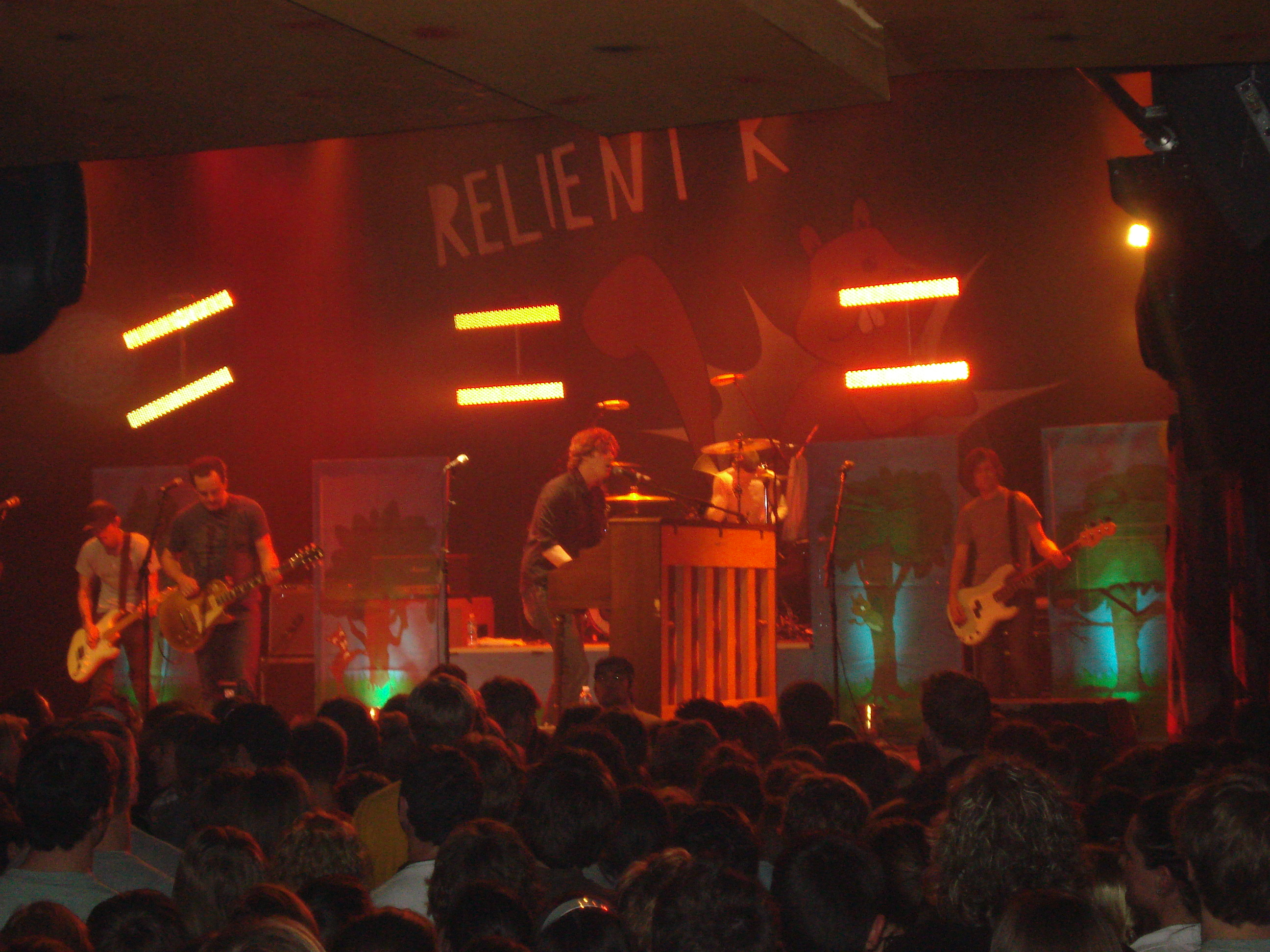
- Relient K at House of Blues in Cleveland performing in May 2007; from left to right: Jon Schneck, Matt Hoopes, Matt Thiessen, Dave Douglas, and John Warne

Background information
- Origin: Canton, Ohio, U.S.
- Genres: Alternative rock; Christian alternative rock; pop-punk
- Years active: 1998–present
- Labels: Gotee; Capitol; Mono vs Stereo; Jive; RCA
- Members: Matt Hoopes; Matt Thiessen; Jon Schneck; Luke Preston; Christian Zawacki
- Past members: Brian Pittman; Todd Frascone; Stephen Cushman; Brett Schoneman; Dave Douglas; Jared Byers; John Warne; Ethan Luck; Tom Breyfogle; Mark Lee Townsend; Jake Germany
- Website: relientk.com

Relient K (/rɪˈlaɪ.ɪnt ˈkeɪ/) is an American rock band formed in 1998 in Canton, Ohio, by Matt Thiessen, Matt Hoopes, and Brian Pittman during their third year in high school and time at Malone University in Canton. The band is named after guitarist Hoopes' automobile, a Plymouth Reliant K car, with the spelling intentionally altered to avoid trademark infringement over the Reliant name.

The group is associated with the contemporary Christian music culture, most notably the Christian rock and punk scene. They have also performed alongside secular artists. The band has reached critical success with mainstream pop-punk and alternative rock; additionally, their sound incorporates piano and acoustic elements. Since its formation, Relient K has released nine studio albums, seven EPs, one Christmas album, and one collection of rarities. The band has received numerous awards including a Grammy Award nomination in 2004 for Best Rock Gospel Album and two Dove Awards.

Relient K has found commercial success with their studio albums, three of which peaked in the top 15 of the U.S. Billboard 200 chart: 2004's Mmhmm, which debuted at No. 15, 2007's Five Score and Seven Years Ago, their fifth and most successful album, which debuted at No. 6; and 2009's Forget and Not Slow Down, which debuted at No. 15. The band has sold over 2 million records, with three albums being given a gold certification by the RIAA. The band is also highly successful throughout the Christian albums and contemporary Christian music charts. On October 4, 2011, the band released a cover album Is for Karaoke. On July 2, 2013, the band's seventh full-length album, Collapsible Lung, was released. On July 22, 2016, the band's eighth full-length album, Air for Free, was released. On April 24, 2020, they released Relient K: Live, which includes 15 tracks that were only previously available on vinyl and were recorded at shows in 2009 and 2016.

== History ==
=== All Work and No Play and Relient K (1998–2000) ===
Founded in 1998, Relient K was formed by Matt Thiessen, Matt Hoopes and Brian Pittman. Named after Hoopes' Plymouth Reliant K car, they played their first show at a friend's house on New Year's Eve, playing in front of roughly 15 people. Todd Frascone later joined for a short time in 1998 as a drummer. However, Frascone left the band after recording the demo All Work & No Play. Released on June 20, 1998, the demo was recorded by Mark Lee Townsend, the former live guitar player for dc Talk. Townsend had met the band members because his daughter, Danielle, was friends with the band. Danielle eventually married guitarist Matt Hoopes.

All Work & No Play caught the attention of dc Talk's Toby McKeehan (tobyMac), who later signed the band to his label, Gotee Records. Relient K released its debut EP, 2000 A.D.D., with Gotee Records in 2000, with Stephen Cushman on drums. Soon after, the band released Relient K on April 25, 2000, the group's first full-length CD, which featured lyrics with a wide range of pop-culture and Christian references. The album spawned two singles: the debut single "My Girlfriend" and "Wake Up Call". In an interview, Matt Thiessen said that when the band started, he was the only one who sang, but he knew Matt Hoopes could sing as well. Hoopes was reluctant, but Thiessen said he "got it out of him". As a result, Hoopes became the backing vocalist. It was recorded at Townsend's home studio in Nashville, where he recalled, "It was very disarming for them in a good way. We just worked at it and got it right. I didn't want to play guitar on the record. I wanted to force them to play. And they rose to the occasion."

=== The Anatomy of the Tongue in Cheek and Two Lefts Don't Make a Right...but Three Do (2001–2003) ===
As the group was preparing to record their second full-length album, Cushman left later in 2000, to join the Christian metal band Narcissus. Brett Schoneman of Christian rock band Philmore filled in temporarily, followed by Jared Byers, drummer of the Christian rock band Bleach, until Dave Douglas joined in December 2000. The band released their second studio album, The Anatomy of the Tongue in Cheek, on August 28, 2001. Though there were still plenty of pop-culture references on this album, it contained more maturity and growth both musically and lyrically. The album's sound is described as "tighter" and punk rock leaning. The group also released The Creepy EP on the same day, featuring two songs from the album and four exclusive tracks. Three singles were released from the album, "Less is More" and "Pressing On" in 2001, and "For The Moments I Feel Faint / Those Words Are Not Enough" in 2002. The album peaked at number 158 on the Billboard 200 and at number six on the US Christian Albums chart. It has sold 300,000 copies and was certified Gold by the Recording Industry Association of America. The group toured in support of the album, playing nearly 200 shows in North America towards the end of 2001.

The album landed them in the Christian rock limelight, and Relient K was offered a clothing deal with Abercrombie & Fitch in 2001. Gotee, the band's label, accepted the offer on Relient K's behalf; Pittman recalls, "The choice was never really given to us. The label made the choice." After significant pressure from conservative Christian organizations such as Focus on the Family, Gotee backed out of the contract.

Relient K was asked to do a rendition of the popular VeggieTales song "The Pirates Who Don't Do Anything" for the 2002 feature length VeggieTales movie Jonah: A VeggieTales Movie. The song appeared on the Veggie Rocks! compilation album. The song would be later used again in The Pirates Who Don't Do Anything: A VeggieTales Movie.

On March 11, 2003, Relient K released their third studio album Two Lefts Don't Make a Right...but Three Do. The album peaked at number 38 on the Billboard 200 and at number two on the Christian Albums chart. It was nominated for a Grammy in the category of "Best Rock Gospel Album" and won the Dove Award for "Modern Rock Album of the Year" in 2004. The group released "Getting Into You" and "I Am Understood?" as a double single in 2003. "Getting Into You" peaked at number 25 on the US Hot Christian Songs, their first on that chart, and "I Am Understood?" at number six on the US Christian Rock Songs chart. "Chap Stick, Chapped Lips & Things Like Chemistry" was released as the album's third single. A music video was released for the song. Another double single was released later in the year, "Falling Out / Forward Motion". The album was certified Gold by the RIAA and has sold 518,000 copies in the United States.

In July 2003, Relient K released a limited edition vinyl EP entitled The Vinyl Countdown, with only 1,500 copies in printing. The EP included two versions of the song, "Five Iron Frenzy is Either Dead or Dying". The album was dedicated to Jesse Alkire, contest winner and friend of Matthew Thiessen, who inspired the song "The Vinyl Countdown". The group embarked on the Everybody Wants To Rule The World Tour with Anberlin and Don't Look Down from September to November 2003. On November 4, 2003, Relient K released a bonus disc for Christmas, entitled Deck the Halls, Bruise Your Hand. The album was packaged with Two Lefts Don't Make a Right...but Three Do from November 2003 to December 2003.

=== Mmhmm (2004–2006) ===
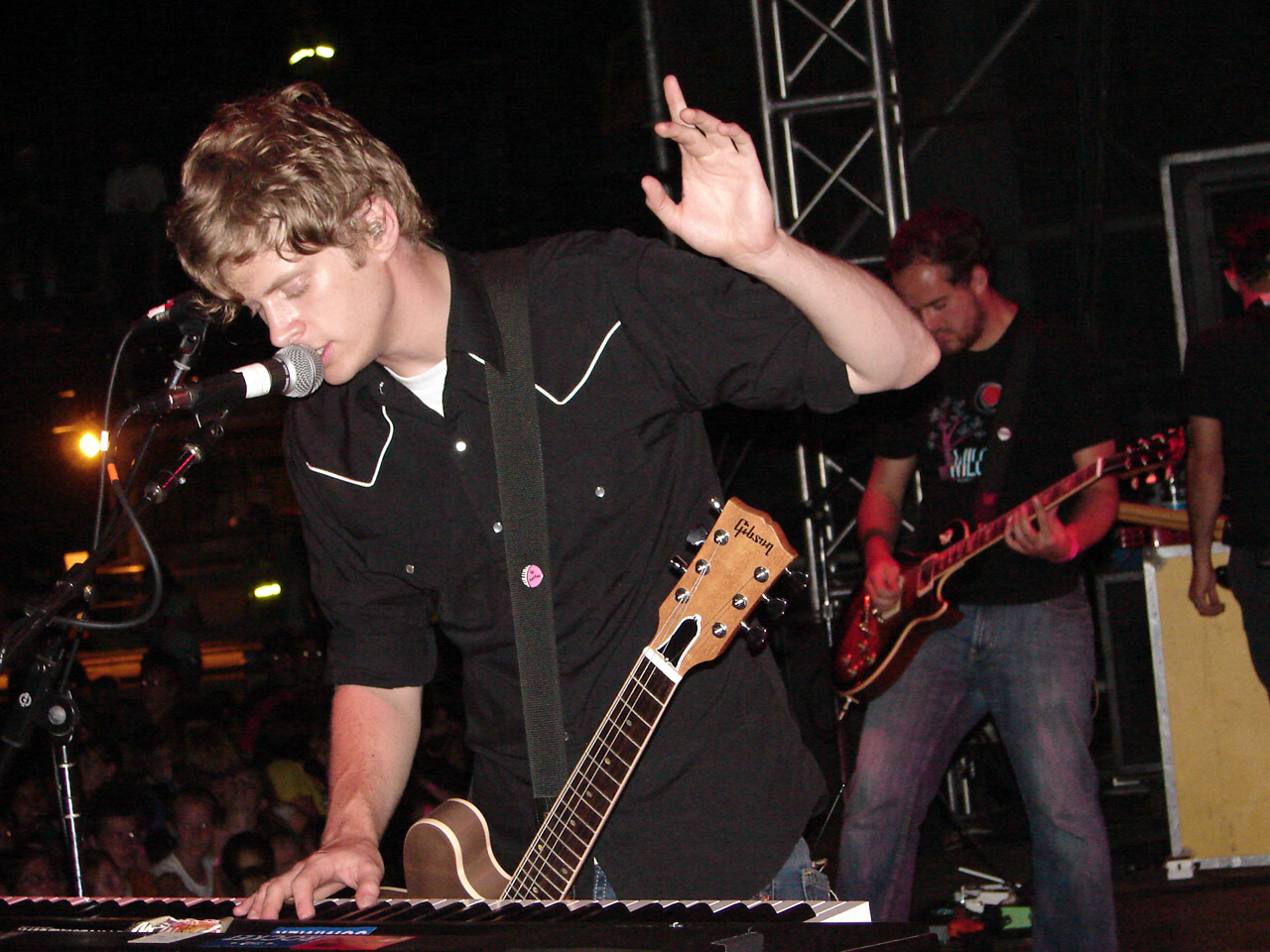
Matt Thiessen (left) and Matt Hoopes (right), two of the band's founders, performing at the Purple Door festival in Lebanon, east of Harrisburg, Pennsylvania, in August 2005

The group headed to Dark Horse Recording in Franklin, Tennessee, to record their fourth studio album, Mmhmm. However, shortly before Mmhmm's release, longtime bassist Brian Pittman left the band, citing that he was tired of touring and wanted to start a landscaping company. Matt Thiessen announced Pittman's departure in fall 2004, saying: "After almost seven years of being in Relient K, our cherished and lifelong friend, Brian Pittman has decided to move on to other things. That IS crazy, huh? Brian decided to leave the band in June, so we've had plenty of time to let the initial shock die down. We're aware that a lot of you already knew, so we apologize for not announcing this sooner. There were many reasons. He thought long and hard about his decision, and he came to the conclusion that he would like to do other things than play bass for the band [...] We want to thank Brian for all the years he gave the band. You're the best, buddy." Pittman still received credits for his contribution on the album. He would join Christian metal band Inhale Exhale shortly afterward. Pittman reunited with the band for one final show, which was the release party for Mmhmm at the Newport Music Hall in Columbus, Ohio, on November 1, 2004. John Warne, lead singer and guitarist of Ace Troubleshooter, filled in as bassist for the remainder of 2004 and became full-time bassist in 2005. Also in 2005, Jon Schneck joined as a third guitarist, as well as a banjo and bell player to create a fuller, more distinctive sound. That was because the band planned to add more piano and having another guitarist gave Matt Thiessen the freedom to do that.

On October 22, the group signed a record deal with Capitol. Mmhmm was released on November 2, 2004. Lyrically, the album showcases the group's growth in songwriting, toning down on the silliness presented in their songs, in favor of "more thoughtful lyricism", focusing on writing songs about failure, forgiveness, redemption and travails of romance. With this decision, they hoped that their fans were "willing to grow up a bit with us". Thiessen wrote most of the songs from January to April 2004, and at the time, was reflecting on his past mistakes and finding hope, a theme he said "should be a part of everyone's life". The album had the band experimenting with its sound a bit more, which included incorporating piano, hardcore punk and some pop music. The album debuted at number 15 on the Billboard 200 and sold 51,473 copies in its first week. It also topped the Christian Albums chart for five weeks. In July 2005, the album was certified Gold by the RIAA for shipping over 500,000 copies. The album has sold 800,000 copies in the United States.

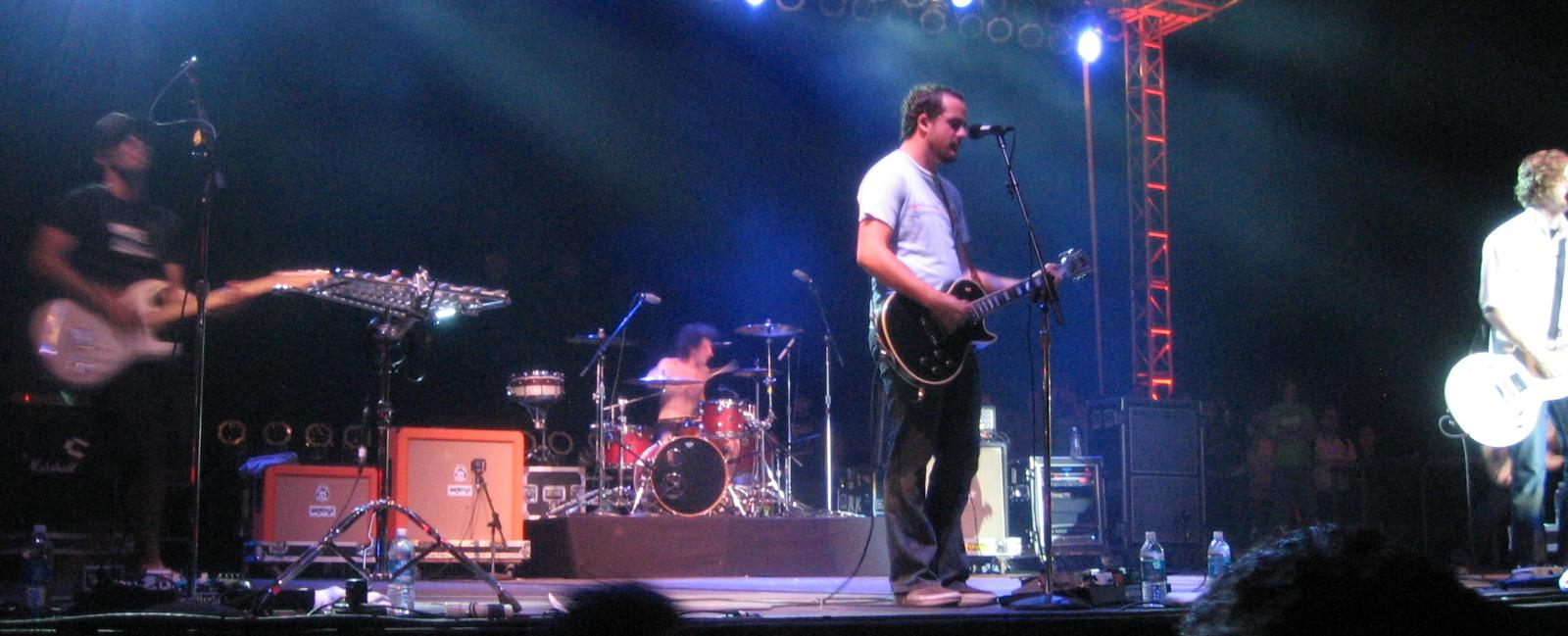
Relient K, live at the Christian rock music festival, Purple Door, August 2006

Mmhmm features two Top 40 hits which both made it on MTV's Top Ten. The lead single "Be My Escape" was released on the same day as the album's release date and was serviced to radio on February 22, 2005. The music video for the track entered MTV's Top Ten, and landed them an appearance on The Tonight Show and Jimmy Kimmel Live!. The song peaked at number 82 on the Billboard Hot 100. It is also topped the US Christian Rock Songs chart. It was featured on Now! 19. The song was certified Gold by the RIAA in October 2005. The album's second single "Who I Am Hates Who I've Been" was released on June 27, 2005. A music video for the song was also released and has made its way onto the Total Request Live countdown, The song peaked at number 58 on the Billboard Hot 100 and reached number 22 on the US Pop Airplay chart. It was included on Now! 21.

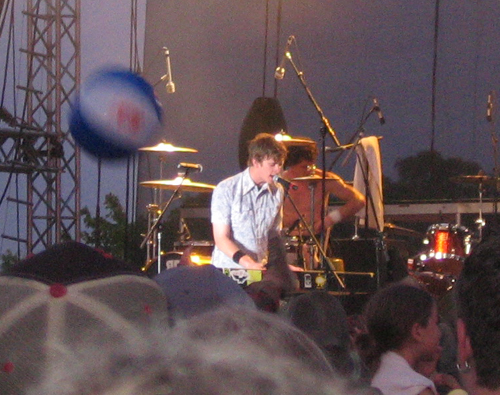
Relient K performing in July 2005

In February 2005, Relient K toured the Southern US states with Mae and Name Taken. They appeared at The Bamboozle festival in April 2005. In May and June 2005, the group supported Good Charlotte and Simple Plan on their co-headlining US tour. Between mid June and mid August, the group went on the 2005 edition of Warped Tour. In October and November 2005, they embarked on a headlining US tour, with support from MxPx, Rufio and Over It. Between February and April 2006, the group went on The Matt Hoopes Birthday Tour, with support from the Rocket Summer and Maxeen. Following this, they appeared at The Bamboozle festival. They later performed at the Nintendo Fusion Tour in the fall of 2006.

Relient K provided the first track, "Manic Monday" originally recorded by The Bangles, to the various artist CD, Punk Goes 80's, released on June 7, 2005. Mmhmm was awarded a Dove Award in 2006 for the "Rock Album of the Year". "Be My Escape" also earned a Dove Award nomination for "Short Form Music Video of the Year". The band was nominated for "Artist of the Year" and "Band of the Year" at GMA Canada's 2006 Covenant Awards. Their song "High of 75" was featured in the soundtrack of the video game MX vs. ATV Untamed. The group released their fifth EP, Apathetic on November 8, 2005. The EP spawned the single "The Truth" and was serviced to radio on November 14. In June 2006, the band appeared on Freaked!, a DC Talk tribute album, produced by Gotee Records, composed of several different bands from that time, paying homage to DC Talk's Jesus Freak album. Relient K performed the song "Between You and Me". The group also released the third single from Mmhmm, "High of 75" on June 2. The song reached number 17 on the US Hot Christian Songs chart.

At the end of 2006, Relient K was named the top Christian rock artist by Radio & Records. They were also ranked at fifth for top Christian CHR artist.

=== Five Score and Seven Years Ago (2006–2008) ===
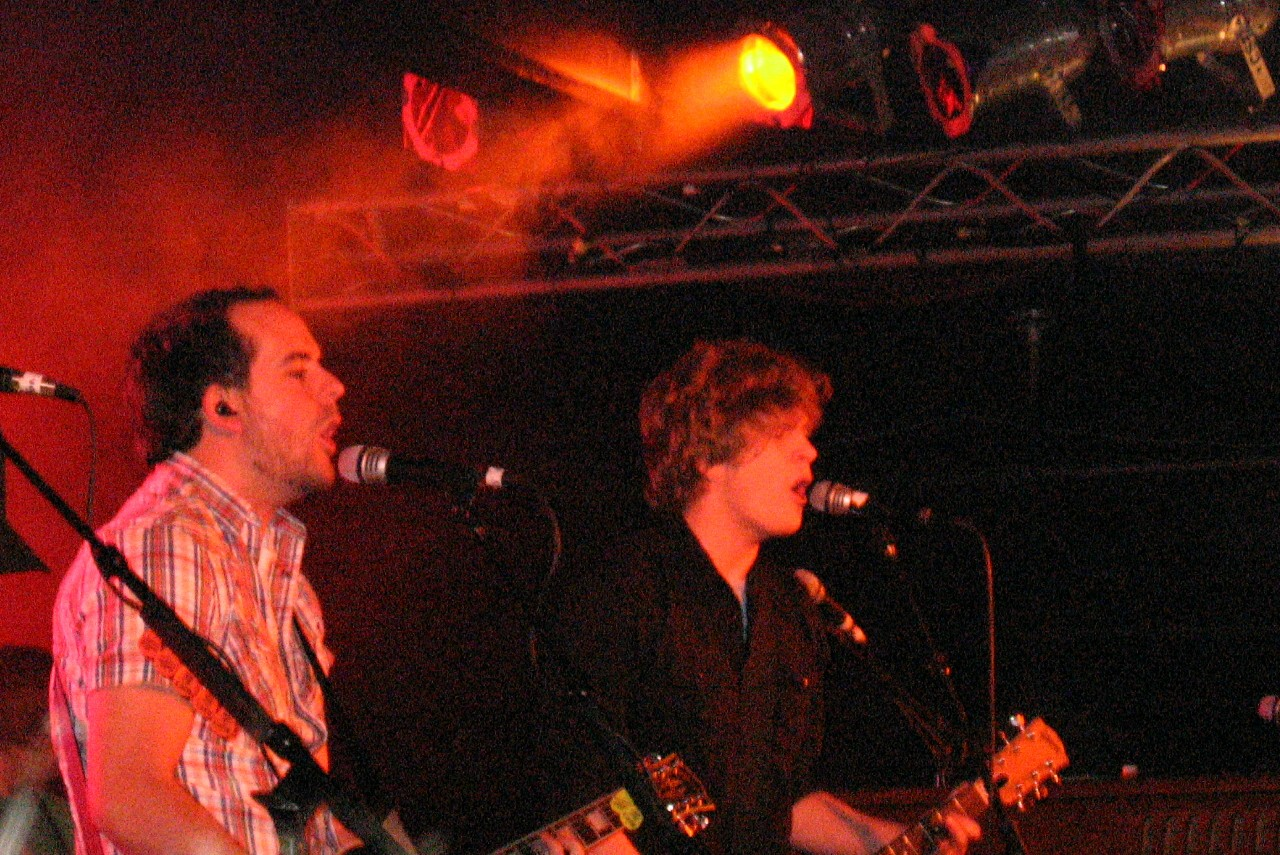
Matt Hoopes (left) and Matt Thiessen (right) performing at the Sonar in downtown Baltimore in May 2007

Recording sessions for another studio album, Five Score and Seven Years Ago, started in June 2006, and continued for parts of July and August. Some tracks on the album were produced by Howard Benson. "Four score and seven years ago" is the first line of the Gettysburg Address, the famous speech delivered by Abraham Lincoln during the American Civil War. Thiessen had said that the title of the album comes from the fact that it's the band's fifth album, it is the first time all five of them are on a record together, and the band had been seven years since the release of Relient K. During pre-production, Capitol Records had a hand in what would be on the album, where as when they were with Gotee Records, the group was able to "do whatever we wanted", according to Thiessen.

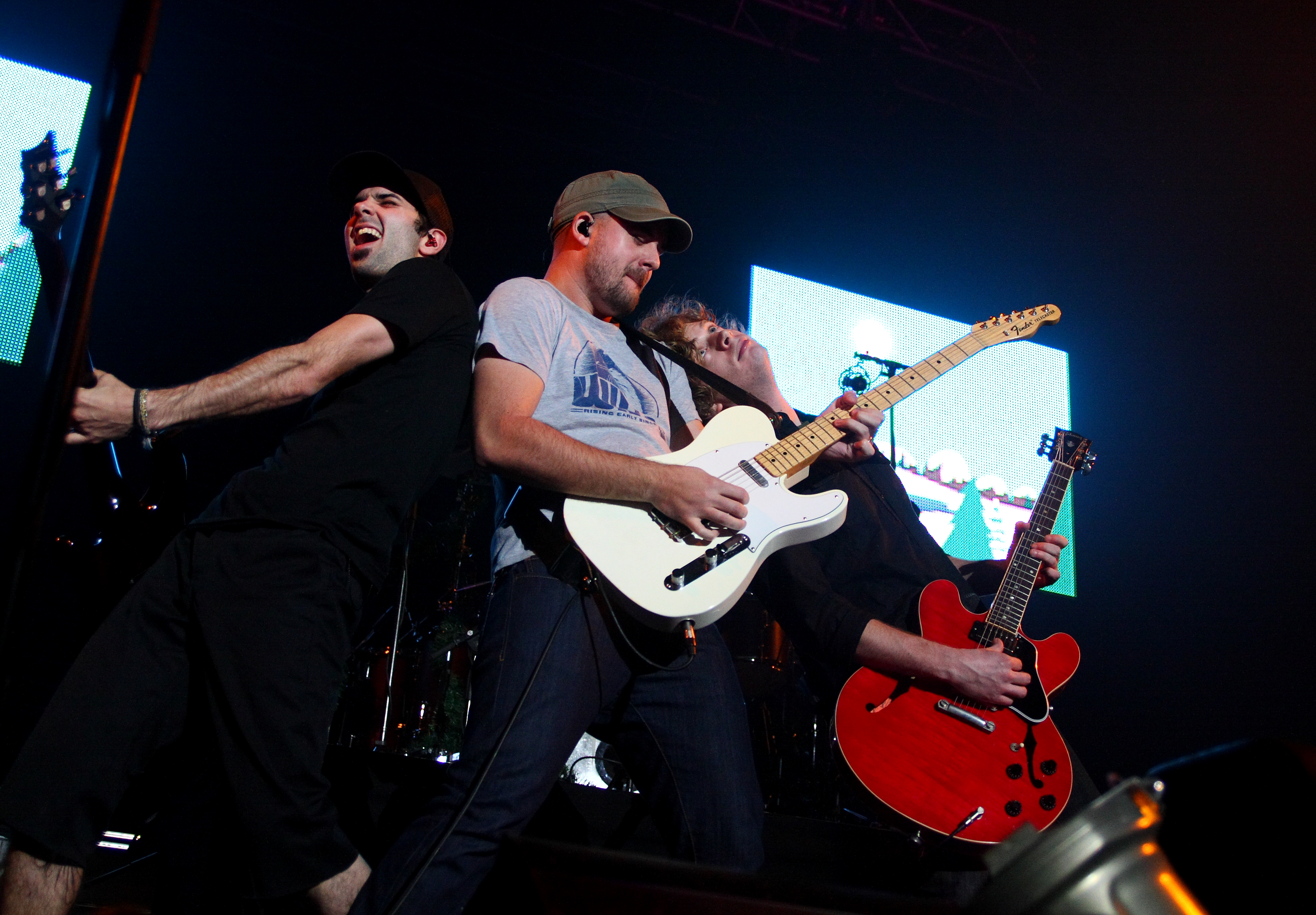
Jon Schneck (left), Hoopes (center), and Thiessen performing with Relient K at Winter Wonder Slam in Greenville, South Carolina, November 2008

While the band hoped for a November 2006 release, the official release date was announced as March 6, 2007. Thiessen said of the album, "The way our career has gone, each of our records slightly outsells the last one. It's been a really steady progression [...] we're building a career. And that's why we were able to make this record. And do it exactly the way we wanted to do it." The album features more instrumentation that of a piano, banjo and lap steel. On March 2, 2007, the entire album (except the last track, "Deathbed") was made available for streaming on the band's MySpace. Five Score and Seven Years Ago debuted at No. 6 on the Billboard 200 chart, selling about 64,000 copies in its first week. The album also topped the US Christian Albums chart for three weeks.

The band's first single from the album, "Must Have Done Something Right", was released on the iTunes Store on November 28, 2006, and to radio on January 8, 2007. "Forgiven" was the first radio single directed at Christian stations and second overall from the album. It was the most added song on Christian radio and peaked at number 13 on the US Hot Christian Songs chart. The single received enough airplay to be the fourth most played song on Christian Hit Radio (CHR) stations in 2007, according to R&R. The third single from the album, "The Best Thing", was released to radio on April 10, 2007. Thiessen has said that the song is "the anti-Daniel Powter 'Bad Day' song. It's straight-up positive." A video was filmed for the single. The second single released to Christian radio and fourth overall, "I Need You", reached number one on the US Christian Rock Songs chart. The third single released on Christian CHR radio stations and fifth overall was "Give Until There's Nothing Left", which was the 20th most played song on CHR radio stations in 2007. The sixth and final single "Devastation and Reform" was serviced to Christian radio in January 2008, and topped the US Christian Rock Songs chart. The song was the fourth most played song on Christian Rock Radio stations in 2008, as well as "The Scene and the Herd" being the tenth most played song, according to Radio & Records.

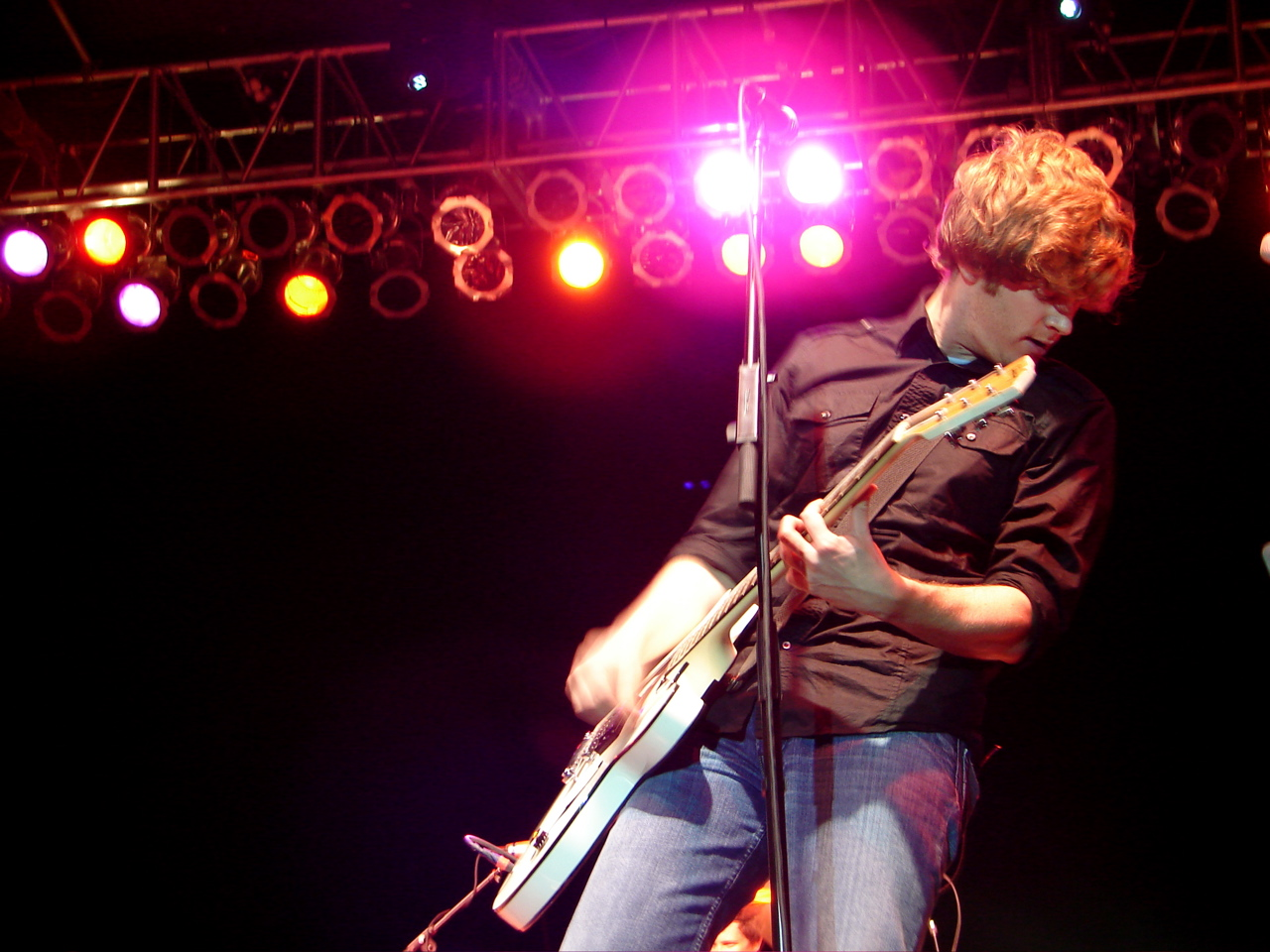
Thiessen performing with Relient K at Purple Door, August 2007

From early March to late May, the band went on a tour of the U.S. with support from Mae and Sherwood. During this trek, they appeared at The Bamboozle festival. In the early morning of June 28, 2007, Relient K's bus engine caught on fire due to an oil spill. Everyone escaped safely, but the band lost many instruments, laptops, cameras, phones, iPods, clothes, and merchandise. Matt Thiessen said he lost a laptop that had roughly 100 unfinished songs on it, and Dave Douglas lost his Battlefield drum set. In the midst of it, the band still laughed at the situation, calling it "cinematic". On a blog post on the band's website, Matt Thiessen stated that the next day after the fire, the band members went to view the damage of their van and found that while 85% of their gear was intact, Douglas's drum kit set was not salvageable. As a result from the fire, the group had to cancel their performance at the Cornerstone Festival.

The band released Let It Snow, Baby... Let It Reindeer, a Christmas album, on October 23, 2007. The CD contained all of the tracks from Deck the Halls, Bruise Your Hand as well as six new songs. This Christmas themed re-release was met with a peak of No. 96 on the Billboard 200. Relient K, Switchfoot, and Ruth recorded a song together, "Rebuild". It is available for download on Switchfoot's website; fans can choose between paying for the song (with proceeds going to Habitat for Humanity) or downloading it for free. From mid-October to early December, the group went on a co-headlining US tour with Switchfoot, dubbed The Appetite for Construction Tour.

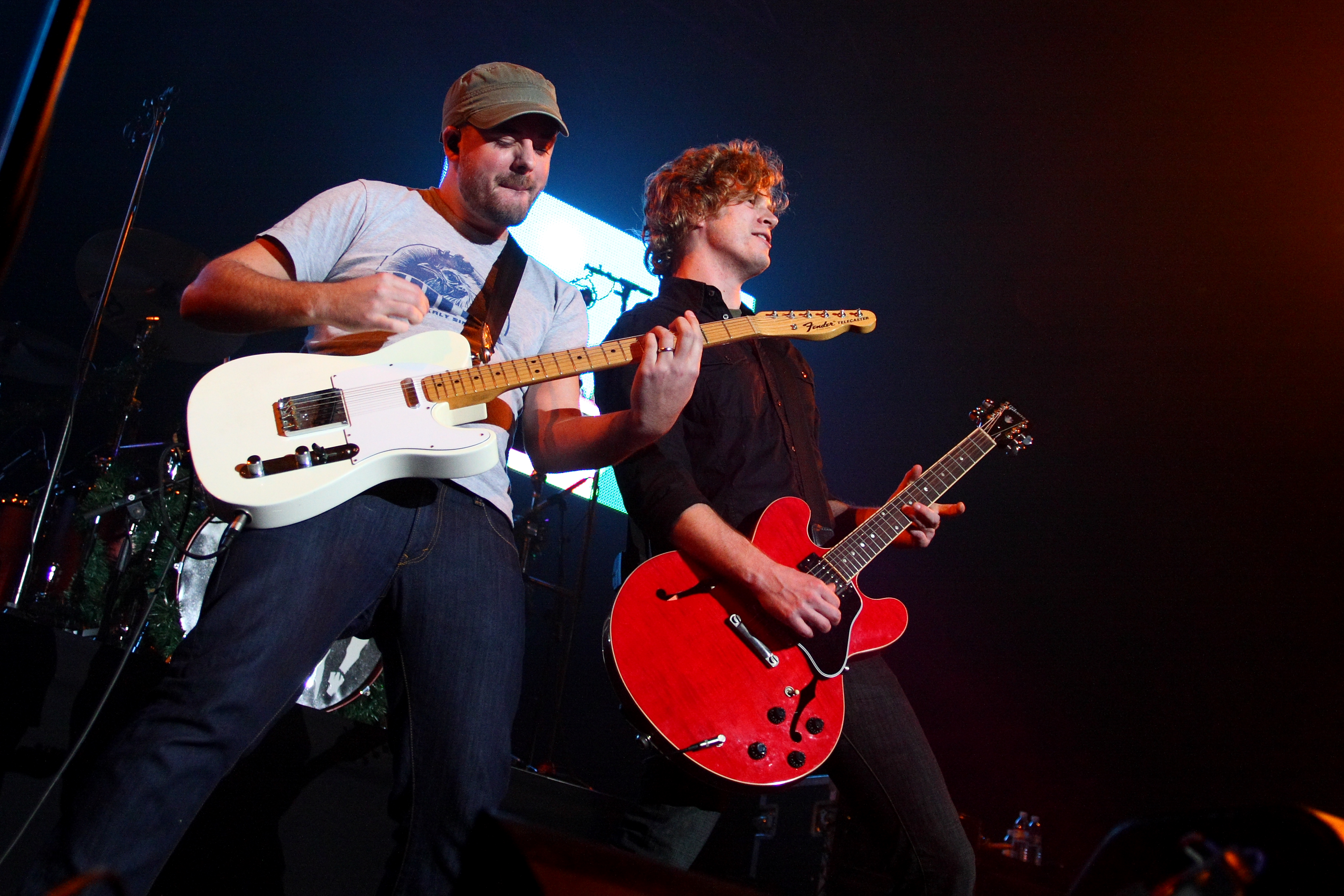
Hoopes (left) and Thiessen (right) performing with Relient K at Winter Wonder Slam, November 2008

On October 18, 2007, drummer Dave Douglas announced his departure on good terms on the band's website due to a desire to pursue his side-project Gypsy Parade with his wife Rachel. He played his last show with Relient K on December 29, 2007. On February 12, 2008, it was announced that Ethan Luck, former guitarist of The O.C. Supertones and for Demon Hunter, would be replacing Douglas as the band's new drummer. Luck and Warne were in a short-lived band together called Guerilla Rodeo. In 2007, they were ranked fourth as the top Christian CHR artists.

=== The Bird and the Bee Sides and Forget and Not Slow Down (2008–2010) ===
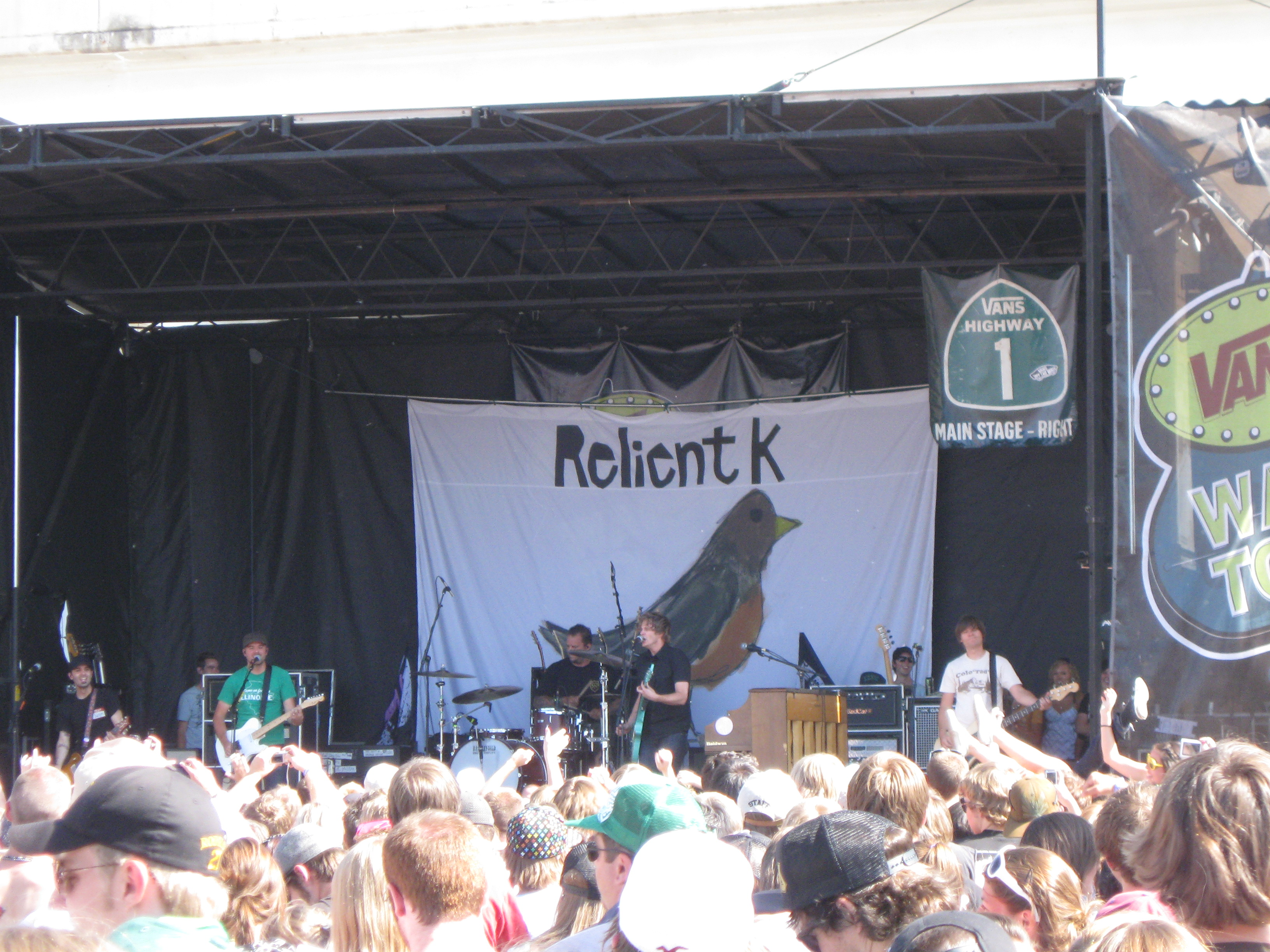
The band performing at a Denver concert during the Warped Tour in June 2008

On July 1, 2008, Relient K released a double EP. The double EP is contained on a single disc and contains The Nashville Tennis EP and The Bird and the Bee Sides. The Nashville Tennis EP included 13 tracks of new material that allowed the band to explore its sound a bit by allowing other band members, besides Thiessen and Hoopes, to compose/record a few tracks, as well as adding some influences from country and reggae music. The Bird and the Bee Sides contained tracks that had previously been released on hard-to-come-by records. The Bird and the Bee Sides won the 2009 GMA Canada Covenant Award for Modern Rock/Alternative Album of the Year. In turning in the EP, Relient K officially fulfilled its contract with Gotee Records and subsequently signed to and now manage Mono vs Stereo (an imprint of Gotee Records).

In October 2008, the band released three bonus iTunes tracks for a re-issue of Let It Snow, Baby... Let It Reindeer and embarked on the Uncle Fest tour. The tracks were later pulled from iTunes, but have since then been released on Gotee Records's 2010 Christmas compilation album: 'Tis the Season to be Gotee.

In early 2009, the band began to write music for an album to be released later that year. Thiessen retreated to Winchester, Tennessee, and isolated himself from other people for several months writing material for the new record. However, he stayed in contact with the other members sharing song ideas for the album. The band worked with producer Mark Lee Townsend again at Dark Horse Recording Studio in Nashville. After recording a few tracks, the band worked on more tracks and were set to be recorded with John Feldmann. Webisodes released weekly online to show the recording progress in the studio. On May 8, 2009, Thiessen announced on Twitter the album's title, Forget and Not Slow Down, also noting that "Forget and Not Slow Down" is the name of a track. Many of their songs in the past were about making mistakes and moving past them, which Matt Hoopes said that this album had "a lot of that feeling." Thiessen also shared that the band wanted to "make a rock record." In late May and early June, the band went on tour with Owl City, Runner Runner and the Classic Crime. Following this, they went on a short Northeast and Midwestern US tour in June and July 2009.

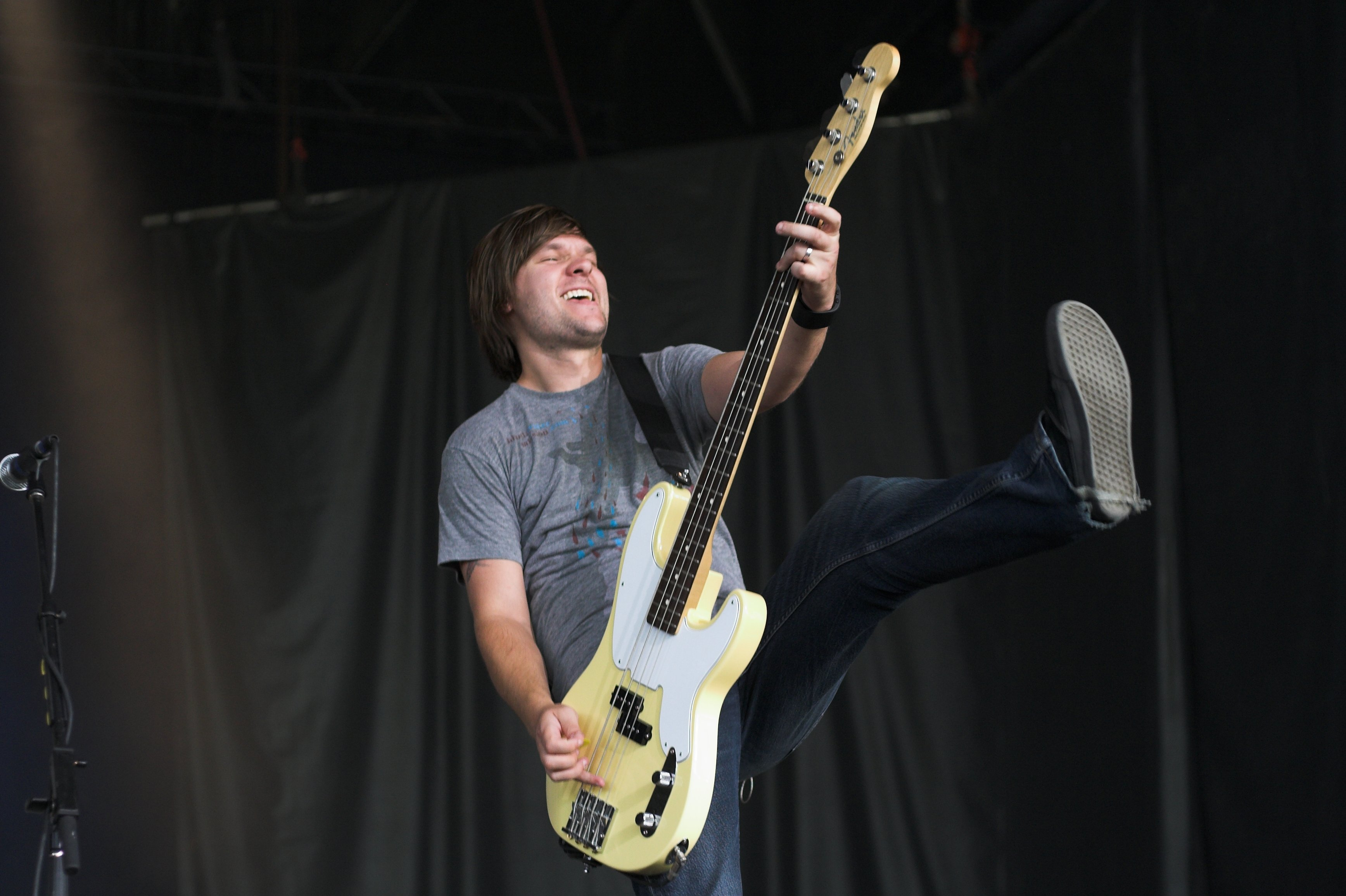
John Warne performing with Relient K at a Winter Jam 2009 concert in Vaughan north of Toronto, June 2009

On September 17, 2009, "Forget and Not Slow Down" was posted online, before it released as the lead single from the album on September 21. "Therapy" was posted online on October 1, and was released to Hot Adult Contemporary radio stations on October 19, as the album's second single. It was released on October 6, 2009, and was their first album release under Mono vs Stereo. The album peaked at number 15 on the Billboard 200 and at number one on the Christian Albums chart. A song titled "Terminals" was left off the album and was released as a B-side. It was produced by Owl City's Adam Young. In November and December 2009, the band went on a US tour with TobyMac. However, in December, Thiessen left the tour due a family emergency. The rest of the band stayed for the remaining four shows and were joined by Tim Skipper of House of Heroes.

In April and May 2010, the band supported Paramore on their headlining US tour, which included an appearance at The Bamboozle festival. On April 20, Relient K released a triple-compilation collection CD entitled The First Three Gears. It included the band's first three studio albums with various "EP exclusive" tracks attached to each CD, according to their approximate release year. In September 2010, the group performed at the Revelation Generation music festival in New Jersey. In October 2010, the band contributed an original song titled "What Can I Do" for Family Christian Stores' exclusive compilation album Freedom: Artists United for International Justice Mission, created in order to generate funds for International Justice Mission in fighting modern-day slavery.

=== Is for Karaoke, Collapsible Lung and Mmhmm 10th anniversary tour (2011–2014) ===
The group began posting pictures on their Facebook to reveal tracks from a forthcoming covers EP. On June 14, 2011, Alternative Press reported the EP would be called Is for Karaoke and displayed the album artwork. The first part, Is for Karaoke EP, was made available for download on June 28. On October 4, the group released the second EP, Is for Karaoke EP, Part 2, and also the full-length album, Is for Karaoke, which features all the tracks from both EPs.

On October 7, 2011, RCA Music Group announced it was dissolving Jive Records along with Arista Records and J Records. With the shutdown, Relient K and all other artists previously signed to these three labels would release their future material on the RCA Records. In May 2012, the group posted that they were working on new material with producer Paul Moak. The group also posted studio video updates within the next few weeks. In July and August, the group went on a tour of the US with Hellogoodbye, William Beckett and House of Heroes.

On February 4, 2013, the band released a single via YouTube, in the form of a lyric video: "That's My Jam". Later, the track was redone, featuring Owl City, as an iTunes bonus track for Collapsible Lung. On February 22, 2013, it was announced that the new album was finished and that details were coming soon. In April and May, the group went on a US tour with Hellogoodbye and William Beckett again, as well as with Mike Mains & The Branches. They also announced that bassist John Warne, guitarist Jon Schneck and drummer Ethan Luck would not be participating on the upcoming tour. On April 21, Luck announced his departure from the group. The group revealed that the album's title would be called Collapsible Lung and the song "Don't Blink" was released in the form of a lyric video on the band's YouTube channel on April 21. On April 19, the band announced that the release of Collapsible Lung had been postponed to July 2013, and the specific date of July 2 was confirmed, along with the album cover artwork, on May 17.

On April 21, Luck officially stated that he is no longer a member of the band. He became the on-tour guitar technician for the Cold War Kids. The band announced that drummer Tom Breyfogle and bassist Dan Gartley would serve as replacements for the US tour. On May 29, the band released a second lyric video for the album via YouTube titled "Lost Boy". This was then followed on June 29, by a third lyric video for the title song "Collapsible Lung". On July 2, 2013, Collapsible Lung was released as expected. The album peaked at number 16 on the Billboard 200 and at number two on the Christian Albums chart. In July, the group embarked on a US tour with the Almost and the Rocketboys, which included three dates at Warped Tour. In November, the group went on a co-headlining US tour with Motion City Soundtrack. They were supported by Driver Friendly.

In June 2014, the band contributed two songs to Gotee Records' twentieth anniversary album, Gotee Records: Twenty Years Brand New: a cover of "Body Be" by Johnny Q. Public, as well as a tenth anniversary version of the band's "Sadie Hawkins Dance". In July 2014, the band announced a 10th anniversary "Mmhmm" tour slated from October 30 in Louisville to December 12 in Nashville. Drummer Dave Douglas returned to the band and joined them on the anniversary tour.

=== Air for Free (2016–2020) ===
On September 30, 2015, long-time Relient K producer Mark Lee Townsend posted a short video on his Twitter account with the caption "RK 8 has been serious fun to make... you're gonna dig it. #rkjamsessions." The video showed Matt Thiessen, Matt Hoopes, and three other people in a studio recording a new song. Thiessen said in an interview in November 2015, "[Relient K has] a new record finished and poised for a 2016 release." At a show in December, the band revealed the album's title to be Air for Free. On February 14, 2016, Relient K digitally released a new single titled "Look on Up". The song, however, was said by the band to not make it onto the new record.

On April 13, 2016, the group announced pre-orders for their eighth studio album Air for Free, with a release date for July 22, 2016. They worked with Mark Lee Townsend again, who produced the album. It has 16 tracks, and is available digitally, on CD and vinyl. That same day, "Bummin'" was released as the album's lead single. On June 21, the group streamed the song "Mrs. Hippopotamuses" from the album, via YouTube. On July 22, Air for Free was officially released. It debuted at number 44 on the Billboard 200, number one on the Top Christian Albums, number six on the Top Rock Albums and number three on the Top Alternative Albums, selling 9,000 copies in its first week. On September 1, the group released a music video to "Mountaintop".

In July 2016, Relient K confirmed that drummer Dave Douglas had rejoined the band in an official capacity, along with bassist Tom Breyfogle and producer Mark Lee Townsend on guitar, who would all join them on tour. On October 27, 2016, Relient K digitally released The Creepier EP...er, a Halloween-themed EP. Relient K toured alongside Switchfoot on the Looking for America tour from September 17, 2016, to November 26, 2016. Relient K announced beginning on January 21, 2017, that they would embark on a second tour with Switchfoot, the Still Looking For America 2our covering Western U.S. and Canada.

On February 12, Relient K digitally released a Valentine's Day EP titled Truly, Madly, Deeply EP. The following day, the group released a music video for "Candy Hearts". In July 2017, the group performed at the Alive Festival, with Jake Germany joining the band's lineup on keyboards and vocals.

The group spent the next three years re-pressing previous albums, EPs and live albums on vinyl, with the first one being released in April 2017, their The Nashville Tennis EP. The group released their self-titled album on vinyl in November 2017. That same month, the group was featured on TobyMac's Christmas album Light of Christmas, performing on the song "Can't Wait for Christmas". On November 17, Matt Thiessen took to Instagram to announce he was working on a solo album with Darren King.

In November 2018, the group released the Relient K: Live album on vinyl, featuring nine tracks recorded while on the 2016 Looking For America Tour with Switchfoot. In September 2019, Relient K asked fans to vote for their 12 favorite songs to be featured on their compilation album, All Work & No Playlist. On April 24, 2020, they re-released Relient K: Live, this time combining live tracks from a 2009 show at Rocketown in Nashville and a 2016 show at The Ritz in Raleigh, North Carolina. They also released All Work & No Playlist that year.

=== Um Yeah tour and new music (2021–present) ===
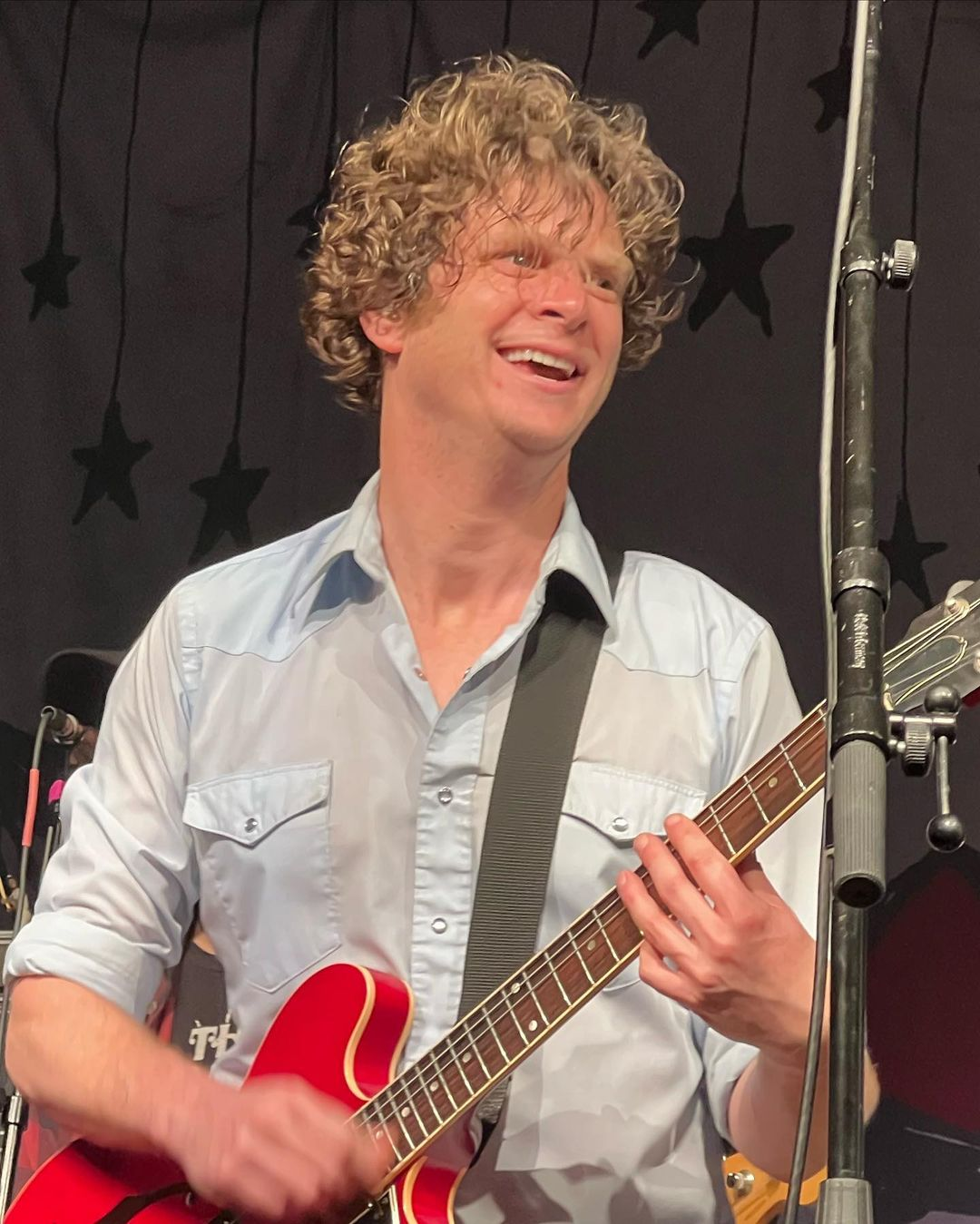
Thiessen of Relient K performing in Irving Square in Manhattan, New York, March 2022

In April 2021, Relient K and former members Jon Schneck, Dave Douglas and Ethan Luck, began teasing something on social media. On June 11, Relient K was featured on the song "A Hurt Like That", released by former member Jake Germany, also known as Phangs. In November 2021, they announced they would be going on tour again, with the other three members officially returning to the band. On February 17, 2022, Relient K kicked off their "Um Yeah Tour" at The Pageant in St. Louis, Missouri, and ended the tour on April 2, 2022, after two shows in Nashville. The group last performed five years ago prior to the Um Yeah tour and Thiessen was uncertain if they would ever perform live again; however, after the tour concluded, Hoopes felt that the band was "re-energized". Thiessen also said that the band had goals to make another album. In a podcast interview, Jon Schneck said the band was trying to schedule a west coast leg of the tour for the fall of 2022, since no cities or states west of Missouri were included in the initial run. He also confirmed that band had begun working on some new songs. In September 2022, the group re-pressed Air for Free. Two months later, a new version of Forget and Not Slow Down was re-pressed.

The band performed at the 2023 Furnace Fest in Birmingham, Alabama, along with other artists such as Anberlin, Between the Buried and Me, Becoming the Archetype, Project 86, and Hatebreed. In July 2023, the band was featured on the song "Fast Car" by Rookie of the Year. In September 2023, Relient K made a guest appearance on the deluxe edition of The Beautiful Letdown (Our Version) by Switchfoot, performing the song "Ammunition". They also performed at the Furnace Fest that same month.

In 2024, the band released a 20th anniversary vinyl for Mmhmm and a 15th anniversary vinyl for Forget and Not Slow Down. On May 30, 2025, Relient K performed a new song titled "Over My Head", at a surprise show in Nashville, at which new member, drummer Christian Zawacki was introduced, replacing Jack Ivins, who had in turn replaced Dave Douglas. The group also announced that Luke Preston had officially joined the band, who originally served as a touring musician for them in 2023. The band collaborated with Switchfoot and released a cover of "God Only Knows" by the Beach Boys on June 13. In June and July 2025, the group performed at the All Your Friends and Alive Music Festival. As of July 2025, despite writing songs, Thiessen stated that the band has no plans to record new music at that time.

The band is scheduled to perform at the Sonic Temple Festival and Welcome to Rockville in May 2027.

== Musical styles and influences ==
Relient K's music is described as alternative rock, Christian alternative rock and pop punk. The group has cited early influences from Blink-182, NOFX, Less Than Jake, Ghoti Hook and MxPx. Lyrical influences include Tom Petty, Paul Simon and John Mayer. Their first three studio albums, Relient K (2000), The Anatomy of the Tongue in Cheek (2001) and Two Lefts Don't Make a Right...but Three Do (2003) are described as pop punk, though the latter sees the band take a step back from their punk influence, in favor of "a more rock-savvy direction". According to Thiessen, the band's first two albums were influenced by The Thrills. On the band's fourth studio album Mmhmm, it was described as Christian punk and pop punk. Thiessen felt that the record showcased a "heavier" side to the band. Their fifth studio album Five Score and Seven Years Ago is described as pop punk and power pop, with influences of a Beach Boys, Blink-182 and Fountains of Wayne sound. During this time, the group faced a bit of criticism from the contemporary Christian music scene, supposedly detaching from the scene. Guitarist Matt Hoopes addressed the claim stating, "We're not afraid of CCM. We definitely have a problem with a genre of music that's totally based on lyrics." Thiessen also added, "In the same way, our music has transformed. I'm still addressing the faith issues. I love to write about them because that means a lot to me, but I address those issues in a way that's not shoving things down anyone's throats because that's the last thing we want to do. It's important to us and we'll sing about it, but we don't preach onstage. We're not that kind of band."

The band's sixth studio album Forget and Not Slow Down is described as alternative rock. On their seventh studio album Collapsible Lung, it marks the band's departure of their early pop punk sound and leans into a more adult contemporary, pop rock and pop direction. Their eighth studio album Air for Free sees the band return to a Christian rock and alternative rock sound, while also maintaining a pop rock sound.

== Band members ==
Current members

- Matt Thiessen – lead vocals, rhythm guitar, keyboards, piano, occasional trombone. (1998–present)
- Matt Hoopes – lead guitar, backing and occasional lead vocals (1998–present)
- Jon Schneck – rhythm guitar, banjo, mandolin, percussion, backing and occasional lead vocals (2005–2015, 2021–present)
- Luke Preston – bass, backing vocals (2025–present; touring musician 2023–2024)
- Christian Zawacki – drums (2025–present)

Former members

- Brian Pittman – bass (1998–2004)
- Todd Frascone – drums (1998)
- Stephen Cushman – drums, backing vocals (1998–2000)
- Brett Schoneman – drums (2000)
- Jared Byers – drums (2000)
- Dave Douglas – drums, backing vocals (2000–2007, 2016–2023; touring/session musician 2014–2016)
- John Warne – bass, backing and occasional lead vocals (2004–2013)
- Ethan Luck – drums (2007–2013), backing and occasional lead vocals (2007–2013, 2022), rhythm guitar (2007–2010), bass (2022)
- Tom Breyfogle – bass, backing vocals (2016–2017; touring/session musician 2014–2016), drums (2013–2014; touring musician)
- Mark Lee Townsend – rhythm guitar, backing vocals (2016–2017)
- Jake Germany – keyboards, backing vocals (2017)

Former touring musicians

- Dan Gartley – bass, backing vocals (2004, 2013)
- Justin York – rhythm guitar, backing vocals (2010–2011)
- Jeremy Gifford – bass, backing vocals (2013)
- Zac Farro – drums (2013)
- Josh Sudduth – rhythm guitar, backing vocals (2014–2018)
- Jack Ivins – drums (2023–2025)

Timeline

== Other projects ==
=== The Complex Infrastructure Known as the Female Mind ===
In 2004, Relient K released a book, The Complex Infrastructure Known as the Female Mind. The title of the book is taken from the last line of the song "Mood Rings", which is found on the band's third album, Two Lefts Don't Make a Right...but Three Do. Though the band is listed as co-author of the book, the band members contributed very little to the content of the book. The book clues in the confused male Relient K fans on the thoughts of female fans, and clues in the confused female Relient K fans on some of the thoughts of males. The band gives advice on the opposite sex through personal experience, stereotypes (including The Rock Chick and Vanilla Pudding), and Biblical advice—presented in the attitude found in the group's music. Matt Hoopes later apologized for the book's existence, acknowledging that it perpetuated harmful stereotypes and clarifying that they had agreed to the original concept but did not review the book's contents before release.

=== Woodland Forest ===
In June 2006, Relient K released the first episode of the group's own flash cartoon. The cartoon featured all five band members, and took place in a fictional land known as Woodland Forest. It was animated by bassist John Warne. There were only two episodes, and they can be found on YouTube. The cartoons also featured "Merle the Squirrel", singing the Woodland Forest theme song, as well as "Crosby the Reindeer", singing "O Holy Night".

=== Related projects ===
Outside of Relient K, Matt Thiessen has a piano-focused solo project called Matthew Thiessen and the Earthquakes. He started it in 1998, around the time Relient K was started. He released a full album, Wind Up Bird, under the project in 2018.

Guitarist Matt Hoopes launched his own guitar pedal company 1981 Inventions in 2018.

Former drummer Dave Douglas created a project called Agnes, a solo rock project that somewhat resembles the sound of Relient K's earlier music with his own twist. Douglas also started a project called Gypsy Parade, a softer project that he started with his wife, Rachel. Douglas amicably left Relient K to further pursue this project.

Ethan Luck, the former drummer, was involved with the Christian metal band Demon Hunter until late 2009, but he also has a side project called My Red Hot Nightmare. Luck also played guitar in the Christian Ska band The O.C. Supertones and is featured on a few of the band's albums, including Loud and Clear and Live! Volume One.

Three tracks were featured on the compilation album My Other Band, Vol. 1 on Mono vs Stereo records in 2006, from Matt Thiessen's side project Matthew Thiessen and the Earthquakes, Dave Douglas' side project Agnes, and Ethan Luck's My Red Hot Nightmare project.

In 2011, John Warne became a member of Yellow Second.

=== Philanthropy ===
Relient K was part of a fundraiser called "Habitat for Humanity" with other Christian bands. Matt Thiessen and Jon Foreman, the Switchfoot's lead singer and guitarist, wrote a song called "Rebuild" to help raise money. The group also starred in the educational drug abuse prevention film, "Natural High 4". The band members provided advice to young adults to stay off of drugs and to pursue their personal best.

== Discography ==
=== Studio albums ===
- Relient K (2000)
- The Anatomy of the Tongue in Cheek (2001)
- Two Lefts Don't Make a Right...but Three Do (2003)
- Deck the Halls, Bruise Your Hand (2003)
- Mmhmm (2004)
- Five Score and Seven Years Ago (2007)
- Let It Snow, Baby... Let It Reindeer (2007)
- Forget and Not Slow Down (2009)
- Is for Karaoke (2011)
- Collapsible Lung (2013)
- Air for Free (2016)

== Awards and nominations ==
Year	Association	Category	Nominated work	Result	Ref.
2004	Grammy Awards	Best Rock Gospel	Two Lefts Don't Make a Right...but Three Do	Nominated	
2004	GMA Dove Award	Modern Rock Album of the Year	Two Lefts Don't Make a Right...but Three Do	Won	
2006	GMA Dove Award	Rock Album of the Year	Mmhmm	Won	
2006	GMA Dove Award	Recorded Music Packaging of the Year	Mmhmm	Nominated	
2006	GMA Dove Award	Pop/Contemporary Recorded Song of the Year	"Be My Escape"	Nominated	
2006	GMA Dove Award	Short Form Music Video of the Year	"Be My Escape"	Nominated	
2006	GMA Dove Award	Rock Recorded Song of the Year	"Who I Am Hates Who I've Been"	Nominated	
2006	Covenant Awards	Artist of the Year	Relient K	Nominated	
2006	Covenant Awards	Band of the Year	Relient K	Nominated	
2006	Juno Awards	Contemporary Christian/Gospel Album of the Year	Mmhmm	Nominated	
2008	GMA Dove Award	Rock Recorded Song of the Year	"I Need You"	Nominated	
2008	Juno Awards	Contemporary Christian/Gospel Album of the Year	Five Score and Seven Years Ago	Nominated	
2009	Covenant Award	Modern Rock/Alternative Album of the Year	The Bird and the Bee Sides	Won	
2010	GMA Dove Award	Recorded Music Packaging of the Year	Forget and Not Slow Down	Nominated	
