= Dave Douglas (drummer) =

American drummer (born 1979)

- Born: David Alan Douglas; August 19, 1979 (age 47)
- Genres: alternative rock, pop punk, hardcore punk, Power pop
- Occupation: Musician
- Instruments: Drums; guitar; bass; vocals
- Years active: 2000–present

David Alan Douglas (born August 19, 1979) is an American musician, most widely known for being the drummer of the American rock band Relient K.

== Musical career ==
Douglas joined Relient K after their former drummer, Stephen Cushman, departed in late 2000. Douglas played the drums and provided background vocals for the band for seven years. Douglas announced on October 18, 2007, that he would be resigning from Relient K on December 29, 2007. He started pursuing new musical avenues, and he started devoting as much time as possible to Gypsy Parade. That band has been reformed and now called Attack Cat.

Douglas rejoined Relient K in October 2014 for the MMHMM 10th Anniversary Tour, providing both drums and backup vocals. This marked the first time he played with the band since his departure in 2007. He continued to serve as a touring and session member before being made an official member again in 2016.

His style often focuses on heavy snare hits on the beat and complex kick patterns.

Back when he joined Relient K, Douglas was also filling in as a guitarist for Ace Troubleshooter, whose frontman was future Relient K bassist John Warne.

=== Agnes ===
Agnes
- Origin: Cleveland, Ohio
- Genres: Christian rock
- Years active: 2005–2007
- Label: Mono Vs Stereo
- Past members: Dave Douglas

Douglas had a solo side project, Agnes. His first three songs debuted on Mono vs Stereo's My Other Band, Vol. 1, which was released in June 2006. The CD was a compilation for members of Christian rock bands to get outside projects of theirs to the public. This project has its own unique sound compared to that of Relient K, although there are hints of Relient K's earlier sound in it.

Douglas started Agnes in late 2005, after tossing the idea around in his head for a few years. The side project was announced on MySpace by his Relient K bandmate Jonathan Schneck around May 2006. He has also done some vocal solos in the Relient K songs "Failure to Excommunicate", "Hoopes I Did It Again", "I Am Understood", "I So Hate Consequences", "More Than Useless", "Life After Death & Taxes (Failure II)", "Apathetic Way to Be", and "I Need You". He also provided vocals for their Christmas songs and for their cover of "The Pirates Who Don't Do Anything".

Douglas explained the name "Agnes" originated in a book that he enjoyed, David Copperfield by Charles Dickens.

==== Songs ====
All songs can be found on Mono vs Stereo's My Other Band, Vol. 1.

- "Gravity"
- "The Brakes"
- "Privileged Few"

=== Gypsy Parade ===
Gypsy Parade
- Origin: Cleveland, Ohio, United States
- Genres: Rock, indie, indie rock, Christian rock
- Years active: 2006–2009
- Past members: Dave Douglas; Rachel Hoskins
- Website: http://www.myspace.com/gypsyparade

Gypsy Parade was another side project by Dave Douglas. Unlike Agnes, Douglas performed for Gypsy Parade with his wife Rachel Hoskins. They recorded a few songs, "Shining", "In Every Moment", and "The Fight of Dugger Ripley" for the project, and released them on their MySpace page.

Gypsy Parade has an obvious rock sound to it, but is not as heavy in some parts of later songs.

A four-track EP was released on July 2, 2009.

=== Attack Cat ===
Attack Cat
- Origin: Cleveland, Ohio, United States
- Genres: Rock, indie, indie rock
- Years active: 2008–present
- Members: Dave Douglas; Rachel Hoskins

Attack Cat is the latest band started by Douglas and Hoskins. They have released two EPs; the second, Dandy Outlaws, was released on October 18, 2011.

== Personal life ==
Douglas has professed an interest in airplanes and said that when he was younger, he either wanted to be a pilot or a musician when he grew up. While he is obviously a musician, he said he still wants to get his pilot's license someday.
