= Mono vs Stereo =

Independent record label in Tennessee

- Parent company: Gotee Records
- Founded: 2003
- Founder: Brad Moist
- Distributor: Word Distribution
- Genre: Christian rock
- Country of origin: U.S.
- Location: Franklin, Tennessee
- Official website: monovsstereo.com

Mono vs Stereo is an independent record label based in Franklin, Tennessee. It was founded in 2003 as an imprint of Gotee Records. While Gotee signs mostly rap, hip-hop, and pop-rock artists, Mono vs Stereo leaned more towards indie music.

== History ==
=== 2003–2006 ===
Mono vs Stereo was established in 2003 and released its first project The compilation album featured the debut song from The Evan Anthem (also Mono vs Stereo's first signing) as well as an exclusive track from Matthew Thiessen and the Earthquakes (side project from Relient K's lead vocalist). Soon after followed a release by Relient K titled The Vinyl Countdown, and the debut album from The Evan Anthem titled Prologue.

2004 saw the release of an EP from singer/songwriter Andy Zipf, an EP from Chasing Victory; and, in the fall, the highly acclaimed debut album from The Showdown titled A Chorus of Obliteration.

In 2005 another Revolution compilation was released with new material from The Evan Anthem and again Matthew Thiessen and the Earthquakes. This was followed by the release of MVS's next signing Last Tuesday, and shortly after that the second album from The Evan Anthem called Sens. Finally, in the fall, two strong debut albums were released, the first by Chasing Victory and the next by southern-hardcore act Maylene & The Sons of Disaster.

2006 began with the release of another new act House of Heroes. This was followed by a concept album called My Other Band which featured five different side projects from members of Relient K, Demon Hunter, Bleach, and Audio Adrenaline. In August the second album from road dogs Last Tuesday was released, and on the heels of that came Gasoline Heart's debut album.

In the first half of 2007 released from The Showdown and Chasing Victory were released to critical acclaim.

=== 2008–present ===
In early 2009 Mono vs. Stereo was brought out of retirement by Relient K who now oversee the label, after completing their contract with Gotee Records. Relient K plans to release its next couple of albums on the label and to sign a new roster of artists. The first band signed under the label's new management is indie rock group Deas Vail. On May 11, 2011, Mono Vs Stereo announced on their website that they had signed Farewell Flight.

== Roster ==
Current

•Relient K

Former

- Andy Zipf (active, signed to Keep On! Music)
- Chasing Victory (active, currently independent)
- Deas Vail (disbanded)
- Denison Witmer (active, currently independent)
- The Evan Anthem (disbanded)
- Farewell Flight (active, currently independent)
- Gasoline Heart (active, on P is for Panda Records)
- House of Heroes (inactive)
- I Am Terrified (inactive)
- Last Tuesday (disbanded)
- Maylene & The Sons of Disaster (on hiatus, currently independent)
- The Showdown (on hiatus, currently independent)

== Discography ==
- June 10, 2003: The Revolution Will Begin In The Blink of An Eye Vol. 1 - Various
- July 18, 2003: The Vinyl Countdown - Relient K
- September 16, 2003: Prologue - The Evan Anthem
- Feb 3, 2004: I Stole the Morning Sun EP - Andy Zipf
- November 16, 2004: A Not So Tragic Cover Up EP - Chasing Victory
- November 16, 2004: A Chorus of Obliteration - The Showdown
- January 3, 2005: The Revolution Will Begin In the Blink of An Eye Vol. 2 - Various
- May 25, 2005: Resolve - Last Tuesday
- July 19, 2005: Sens - The Evan Anthem
- August, 2005: MMHMM (Vinyl) - Relient K
- April 10, 2005: I Call This Abandonment - Chasing Victory
- October 25, 2005: Maylene and the Sons of Disaster - Maylene & The Sons of Disaster
- April 26, 2006: Say No More - House of Heroes
- June 27, 2006: My Other Band, Vol. 1 - Various
- January 8, 2006: You Know Who You Are - Gasoline Heart
- August 15, 2006: Become What You Believe - Last Tuesday
- February 20, 2007: Temptation Come My Way - The Showdown
- August 5, 2007: Fiends - Chasing Victory
- September 18, 2007: Feel Like Hell EP - The Showdown
- September 23, 2008: The End Is Not the End - House of Heroes
- June 10, 2009: Forget and Not Slow Down - Relient K
- October 27, 2009: Birds and Cages - Deas Vail
- April 26, 2011: The Ones Who Wait - Denison Witmer
- December 7, 2011: Out for Blood - Farewell Flight
- April 10, 2011: Is for Karaoke - Relient K
- November 10, 2011: Deas Vail - Deas Vail
- November 29, 2011: For Shepards and Kings - Deas Vail
- June 26, 2012: The Side Effect EP - Deas Vail
- February 7, 2013: Collapsible Lung - Relient K
- July 22, 2016: Air for Free - Relient K

== See also ==
- List of record labels
