= Mark Lee Townsend =

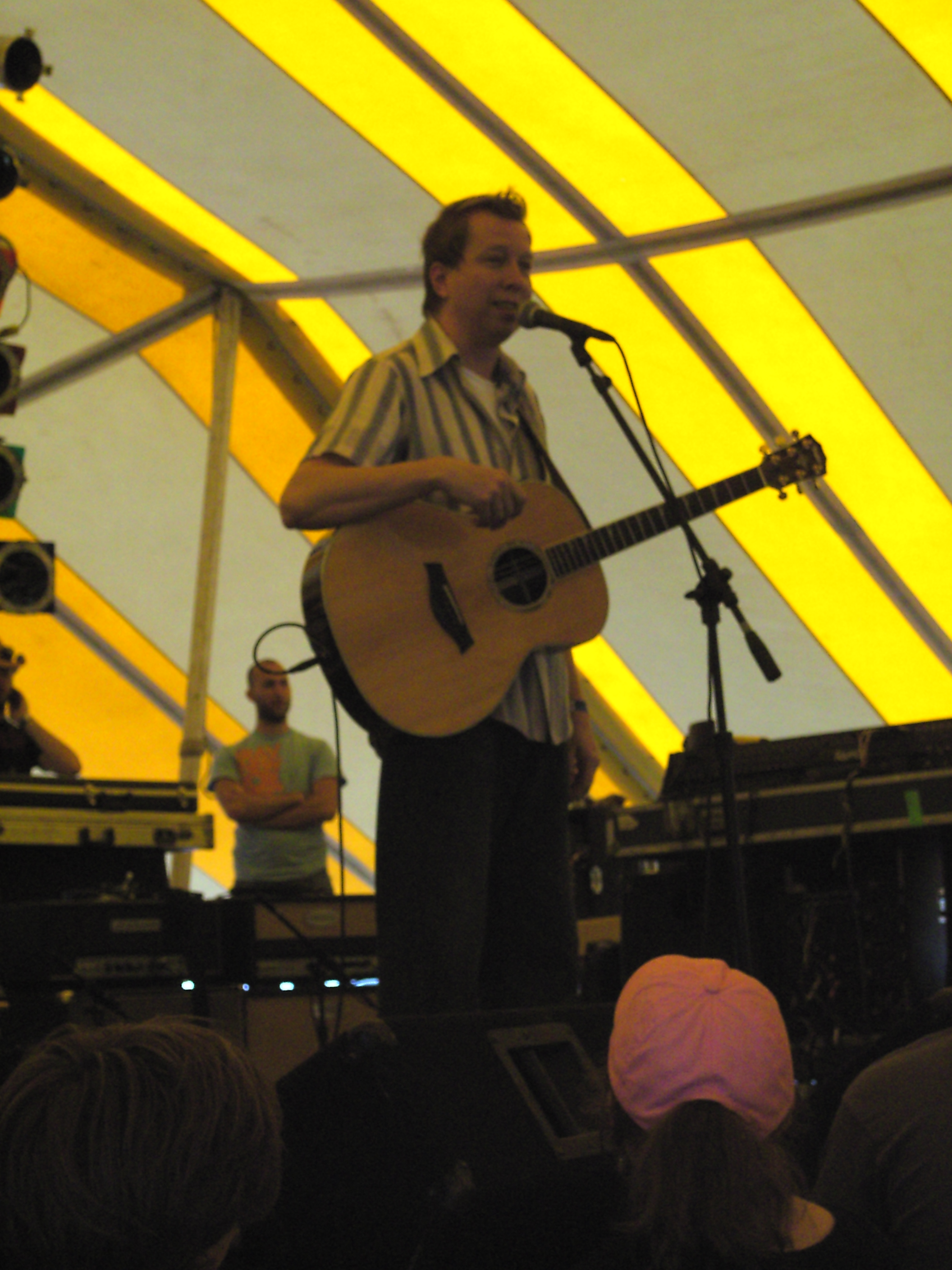
- Mark Lee Townsend playing an acoustic set at Cornerstone Festival 2007.

Background information
- Born: November 19, 1962 (age 62)
- Origin: U.S.
- Genres: Rock, Christian rock
- Years active: 1986–present
- Spouse: Suzanne Marie Townsend

Mark Lee Townsend is an American multi-instrumentalist and record producer best known as guitarist for the Christian rock band dc Talk and as the long-time producer for Christian rock band Relient K.

== Career ==
Townsend's career started as a member, singer, guitarist and songwriter for the pop and Christian band Bash 'N The Code from 1986 through 1991. He played with dc Talk from 1996 until their hiatus in 2001. In between dcTalk tours, he was a lead guitarist for the Christian artist Jennifer Knapp. At the Cornerstone Festival 2000, he appeared doing an acoustic act where he ended his show with a rendition of Queen's "Bohemian Rhapsody". During his time with dc Talk, he and other members of the band formed the band, Zilch, which would become the band Sonicflood, and made the album "Platinum" for Gotee Records.

After dc Talk went on an extended hiatus, Townsend took to producing. He produced Jennifer Knapp Live in 2006, as well as producing and engineering two full-length albums for the Christian rock band The Wedding. He also produced The O.C. Supertones' 2004 album The Revenge of the Supertones. He has also worked with the Christian rock band Relient K as a producer, working on every album by the group except for Collapsible Lung (2013). Townsend and Relient K have been quoted as being like family, as Relient K guitarist Matt Hoopes was married (now divorced) to Townsend's daughter, Danielle Hoopes, who now runs an International Floral shop, Stella Rose Floral. Townsend has been a Gibson guitar endorser and was featured in the article below.

A sideman's greatest asset is the chameleon-like ability to adapt to a variety of musical genres as well as imitate the signature sounds of other players. On the other hand, a session player has truly reached the top of the profession when he's in demand to add his own signature sound to a recording or live tour.

In May 2006, Townsend started his own music label called Brave New World Records. He initially signed two Christian Rock artists (The Wedding and Deas Vail) and produced initial recordings for them, but the label seems to have gone into hiatus as the official website has not been updated since 2009. In 2011, he was reportedly producing The Lasting Hope's debut EP Sunsets and Second Chances. Deas Vail went on to release new music via Relient K's label Mono vs. Stereo Records.
