= Matt Hoopes =

American guitarist (born 1981)

Matthew Hoopes
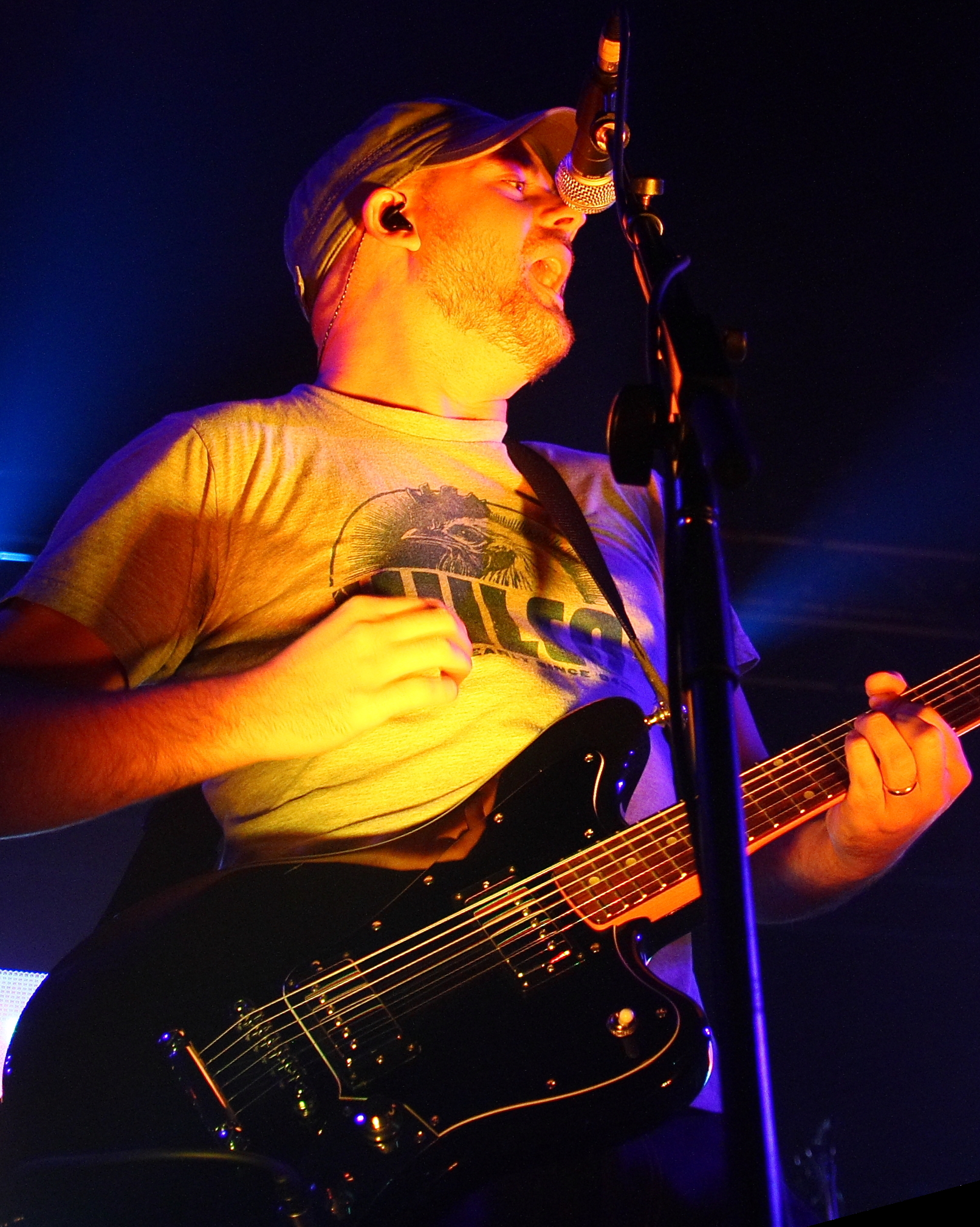
- Hoopes performing with Relient K in 2008

Background information
- Also known as: Blanche
- Born: Matthew Ryan Hoopes; February 15, 1981 (age 45)
- Origin: Canton, Ohio, U.S.
- Genres: Christian alternative rock, pop punk
- Occupation: Musician
- Instruments: Guitar, vocals
- Years active: 1998–present

Matthew Ryan Hoopes is an American musician, best known as the lead guitarist of the rock band Relient K. He has played lead guitar and provided backing vocals for Relient K since 1998 and is one of two constant members of the band, the other being lead vocalist Matt Thiessen.

== Biography ==
Along with Matt Thiessen and Brian Pittman, Hoopes co-founded the band during his junior year of high school at Canton McKinley High School in Canton, Ohio. He met Thiessen when they were in the Church choir together in second grade. Matt Thiessen once said in the book The Complex Infrastructure Known as the Female Mind that Hoopes and Brian Pittman were the athletes in high school, and while they were friends with Thiessen, they were also probably considered cooler than Thiessen. While lead singer Matt Thiessen writes almost every song, Hoopes wrote the songs "Those Words Are Not Enough", "Don't Blink", "You'll Always Be My Best Friend", and "Candlelight". Marilyn Manson, also a native of Canton, is subject of their song "My Girlfriend" although they are not acquainted.

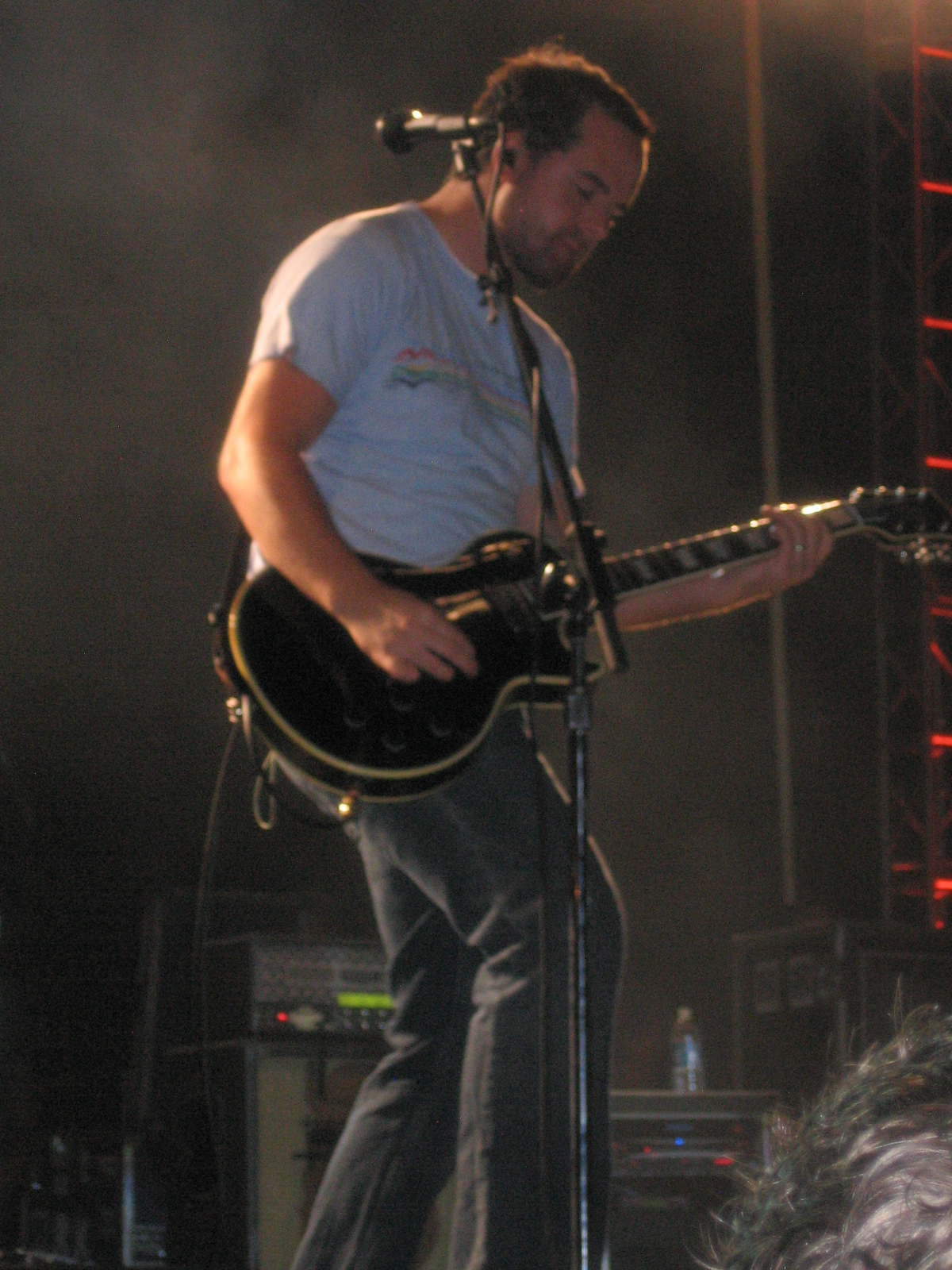
Hoopes performing with Relient K in 2006

Relient K was named after Hoopes' car, the Plymouth Reliant K. When they started in 1998, Hoopes originally did not want to do any singing in the band. However, Matt Thiessen pushed him to do it, saying that he had a great voice. Hoopes has been the primary backing vocalist for the band ever since.

Besides playing for Relient K, Hoopes has also done backup vocals for certain Matthew Thiessen and the Earthquakes songs, and has been a guest guitarist at concerts for the band My Red Hot Nightmare. Hoopes has said he is currently learning to play lapsteel, which would probably be used for the band.

While the band refers to him as "Blanche" to keep from confusing the two Matts, some fans refer to him as "Matty H", or just "Hoopes". Matt Thiessen has said that they can either usually tell who is being asked for when someone says "Matt", or they tend to use a lot of last names.

Matt Hoopes normally plays his guitar in one position (as seen in the picture on the left), so much so that certain fans have called it the "Classic Hoopes Stance". He has said he enjoys root beer and playing golf.

For several months in 2010, Matt Hoopes did not travel with Relient K. However, he remained very active as a team member and band-mate. He still practiced with the band and managed their record label, Mono Vs Stereo. He produced Deas Vail for the Mono vs Stereo label.

Hoopes resumed touring with Relient K in May 2011, as he performed with the band for their acoustic concerts before the Vans Warped Tour.

In 2018, Hoopes launched a guitar effect pedal brand named "1981 Inventions". Their first product was the DRV pedal, designed by engineer Jon Ashley of Bondi Effects and based on the ProCo Rat. 1981 Inventions released their second product, the "LVL" boost pedal in 2023. His wife, Laura, is a Co-Owner in the company.

=== Personal life ===
Hoopes was married and then divorced. In May 2017, Hoopes announced through Instagram that he was now married by posting a picture of his wife with the caption Wifewatch, and she confirmed by changing her last name on Instagram to Hoopes.
