= Relient K discography =

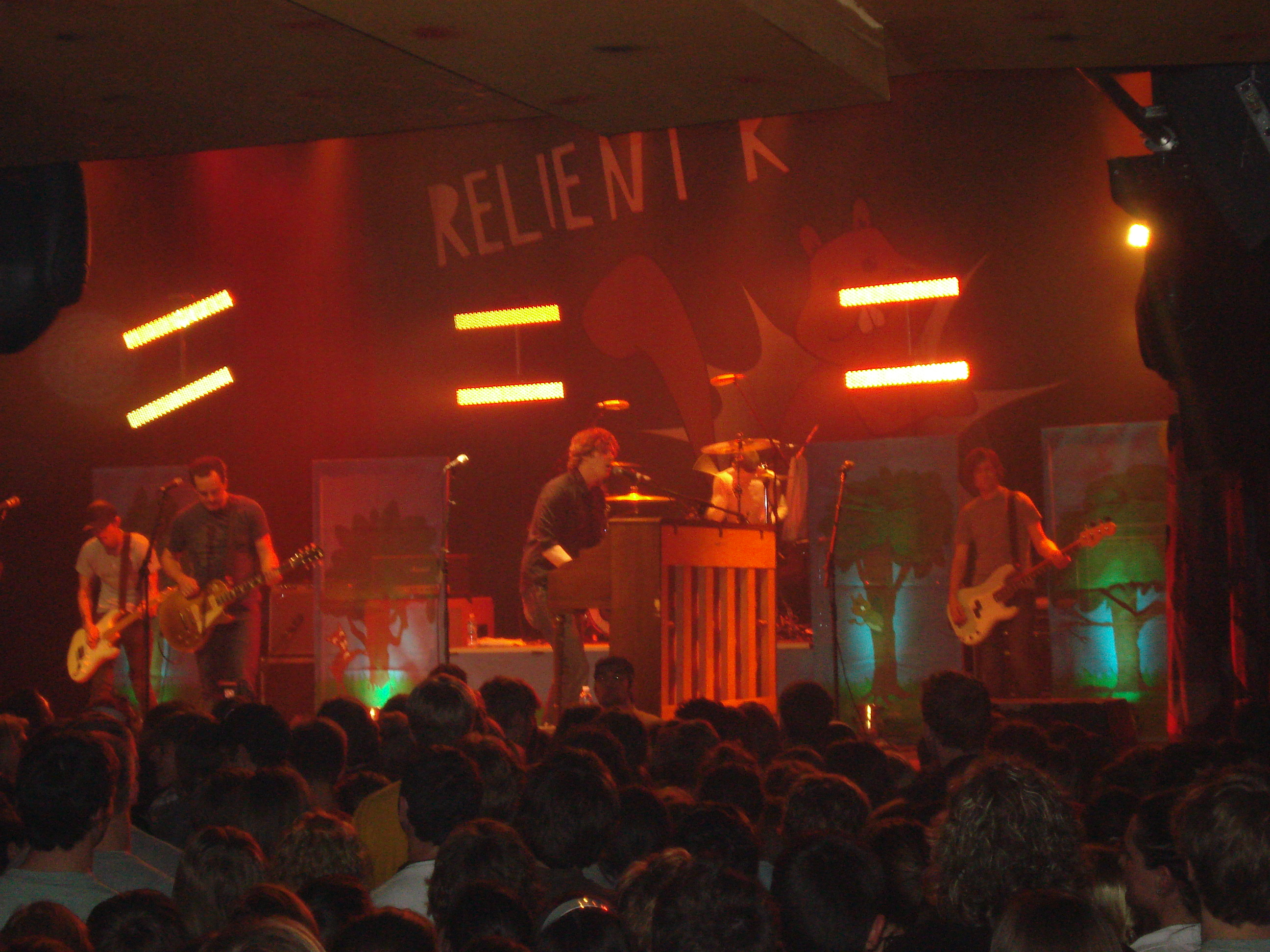
- Relient K live in May 2007. Left to right: Jon Schneck, Matt Hoopes, Matt Thiessen, Dave Douglas, John Warne.
- Studio albums: 8
- Extended plays: 11
- Compilation albums: 5
- Singles: 30
- Music videos: 10
- Others: 1
- Compilation appearances: 15

The discography of Relient K, an American Christian rock band, mainly consists of eight studio albums, eleven EPs, two Christmas albums, thirty singles, and four compilation albums. Relient K released a demo album titled, All Work & No Play on June 20, 1998. The demo album landed them a record deal with Gotee Records and they released their debut studio album Relient K on April 25, 2000, via Gotee. Their second studio album The Anatomy of the Tongue in Cheek was released on August 28, 2001. The album reached number 158 on the Billboard 200.

They released their third studio album Two Lefts Don't Make a Right...but Three Do on March 11, 2003. The album helped them breakthrough into the Christian music scene, where the album peaked at number 38 on the Billboard 200 and number two on the Christian Albums chart. It was certified Gold by the Recording Industry Association of America. The album's lead single "Getting Into You" peaked at number 25 on the US Hot Christian Songs chart. A Christmas album was released on November 4, 2003, titled Deck the Halls, Bruise Your Hand. Their fourth studio album Mmhmm was released on November 2, 2004, through Gotee and Capitol Records. The album spawned two hit singles, "Be My Escape" and "Who I Am Hates Who I've Been". Both singles were certified Gold by the RIAA and reached the Billboard Hot 100 at number 82 and number 58, respectively. The album peaked at number 15 on the Billboard 200 and was certified Gold. The album also topped the Christian Albums chart.

Their fifth studio album Five Score and Seven Years Ago was released on March 6, 2007. The album reached number six on the Billboard 200. A second Christmas album, Let It Snow, Baby... Let It Reindeer was released on October 23, 2007, which peaked at number 96 on the Billboard 200. On October 6, 2009, the band's sixth studio album Forget and Not Slow Down was released, via Mono vs Stereo. The album peaked at number 15 on the Billboard 200 and number one on the Christian Albums chart. Their seventh studio album Collapsible Lung was released on July 2, 2013, and peaked at number 16 on the Billboard 200. They released their eighth studio album Air for Free on July 22, 2016. The album peaked at number 44 on the Billboard 200 and reached number one on the Christian Albums chart.

As of August 2011, the group has sold over two million albums.

== Albums ==
=== Studio albums ===
List of studio albums, with selected chart positions, sales figures and certifications
Title	Album details	Peak chart positions									Sales	Certifications
Title	Album details	US	US Christ	US Rock	US Alt	AUS	CAN	CAN Alt	NZ Heat	UK Indie	Sales	Certifications
Relient K	Released: April 25, 2000; Label: Gotee (GTD 2818); Format: CD, DL, LP	—	—	—	—	—	—	—	—	—		
The Anatomy of the Tongue in Cheek	Released: August 28, 2001; Label: Gotee (GTD2841); Format: CD, DL, LP	158	6	—	—	—	—	—	—	—	US: 300,000	RIAA: Gold
Two Lefts Don't Make a Right...but Three Do	Released: March 11, 2003; Label: Gotee (GTD2890R); Format: CD, DL, LP	38	2	—	—	—	—	—	—	—	US: 518,000	RIAA: Gold
Mmhmm	Released: November 2, 2004; Label: Gotee, Capitol; (GTD72953); Format: CD, DL, LP	15	1	—	—	—	—	—	—	—	US: 800,000	RIAA: Gold
Five Score and Seven Years Ago	Released: March 6, 2007; Label: Gotee, Capitol (CDP 0946 3 70592 2 7); Format: CD, CD/DVD-V, DL, LP	6	1	3	—	—	32	11	—	—	US: 64,000	
Forget and Not Slow Down	Released: October 6, 2009; Label: Mono vs Stereo, Jive (2-520696); Format: CD, DL, LP	15	1	5	4	—	—	—	—	—	US: 33,000	
Collapsible Lung	Released: July 2, 2013; Label: Mono vs Stereo (MVS70044); Format: CD, DL, LP	16	2	4	3	—	—	—	—	—		
Air for Free	Released: July 22, 2016; Label: Mono vs Stereo; Format: CD, DL, LP	44	1	6	3	72	—	—	6	20	US: 9,000	
"—" denotes a recording that did not chart or was not released in that territory.

=== Holiday albums ===
List of holiday albums, with selected chart positions
Title	Album details	Peak chart positions				
Title	Album details	US	US Christ	US Rock	US Alt	US Hol
Deck the Halls, Bruise Your Hand	Released: November 4, 2003; Label: Gotee (GTD72921); Format: CD, DL, LP	—	—	—	—	—
Let It Snow, Baby... Let It Reindeer	Released: October 23, 2007; Label: Capitol (509995 08202 2 1 ); Format: CD, DL, LP	96	5	24	17	8
"—" denotes releases that did not chart or were not released in that territory.

=== Compilation albums ===
List of compilation albums, with selected chart positions
Title	Album details	Peak chart positions			
Title	Album details	US	US Christ	US Rock	US Alt.
Double Take: Relient K	Released: December 26, 2006; Label: Gotee; Format: CD, DL	—	—	—	—
The Bird and the Bee Sides	Released: July 1, 2008; Label: Gotee (GTD70009); Format: CD, DL	25	1	12	9
The First Three Gears 2000–2003	Released: April 20, 2010; Label: Gotee (2-523138); Format: CD, DL	—	—	—	—
Is for Karaoke	Released: October 4, 2011; Label: Mono vs Stereo, Columbia (6694470030 0); Format: CD, DL	—	35	—	—
All Work & No Playlist	Released: 2020; Label: SMLXL Vinyl; Format: LP	—	—	—	—
"—" denotes releases that did not chart or were not released in that territory.

=== EPs ===
List of extended plays, with selected chart positions
Title	Album details	Peak chart positions			
Title	Album details	US	US Christ	US Rock	US Alt
2000 A.D.D.	Released: 2000; Label: Gotee (DPRO14885); Format: CD	—	—	—	—
The Creepy EP	Released: August 28, 2001; Label: Gotee (DPRO16324); Format: CD	—	—	—	—
Employee of the Month EP	Released: 2002; Label: Gotee (DPRO0048); Format: CD	—	—	—	—
The Vinyl Countdown	Released: August 1, 2003; Label: Mono vs Stereo (none); Format: 7" vinyl	—	—	—	—
Apathetic EP	Released: November 8, 2005; Label: Capitol (CDP 0946 3 42009 2 9); Format: CD, DL	94	5	—	—
Must Have Done Something Right EP	Released: 2007; Label: Gotee, Capitol (094638980124); Format: CD	—	—	—	—
The Nashville Tennis EP	Released: July 1, 2008; Label: Gotee (GTD70009); Format: CD, LP	—	—	—	—
Is for Karaoke EP	Released: June 28, 2011; Label: Mono vs Stereo (MVS70021); Format: CD, DL	150	4	40	23
Is for Karaoke EP, Pt. 2	Released: October 4, 2011; Label: Mono vs Stereo (none); Format: DL	—	26	—	—
The Creepier EP...er	Released: October 28, 2016; Label: Mono vs Stereo; Format: DL	—	—	—	—
Truly Madly Deeply EP	Released: February 12, 2017; Label: Mono vs Stereo; Format: DL	—	—	—	—
"—" denotes releases that did not chart or were not released in that territory.

=== Live ===
List of live albums
Title	Album details
Live	Released: April 24, 2020; Label: Mono vs Stereo; Format: CD

=== Others ===
List of other releases
Title	Album details
All Work & No Play	Released: June 20, 1998; Label: Self-released; Format: CD

== Singles ==
List of singles, with selected chart positions and certifications, showing year released and album name
Title	Year	Peak chart positions										Certifications	Album
Title	Year	US	US Pop	US Christ	US Christ Air	US Christ AC	US Christ Rock	AUS Hit.	CAN CHR	UK Christ Air	UKR Air	Certifications	Album
"My Girlfriend"	2000	—	—	—	—	—	—	—	—	—	—		Relient K
"Wake Up Call"	2000	—	—	—	—	—	—	—	—	—	—		Relient K
"Less Is More"	2001	—	—	— (Note: "Less Is More" did not enter the Billboard Hot Christian Songs, but peaked at No. 26 on the Billboard Christian CHR Songs chart.)		—	—	—	—	—	—		The Anatomy of the Tongue in Cheek
"Pressing On"	2001	—	—	—	—	—	2	—	—	—	—		The Anatomy of the Tongue in Cheek
"The Pirates Who Don't Do Anything"	2002	—	—	—	—	—	—	—	—	—	—		Jonah: A VeggieTales Movie Original Move Soundtrack
"For Moments I Feel Faint"	2002	—	—	— (Note: "For Moments I Feel Faint" did not enter the Billboard Hot Christian Songs, but peaked at No. 20 on the Billboard Christian CHR Songs chart.)		—	—	—	—	—	—		The Anatomy of the Tongue in Cheek
"Those Words Are Not Enough"	2002	—	—	—	—	—	3	—	—	—	—		The Anatomy of the Tongue in Cheek
"Getting Into You"	2003	—	—	25		32	—	—	—	—	—		Two Lefts Don't Make a Right...but Three Do
"I Am Understood?"	2003	—	—	—	—	—	2	—	—	—	—		Two Lefts Don't Make a Right...but Three Do
"Chap Stick, Chapped Lips & Things Like Chemistry"	2003	—	—	—	—	—	—	—	—	—	—		Two Lefts Don't Make a Right...but Three Do
"Falling Out"	2003	—	—	—	—	—	—	—	—	—	—		Two Lefts Don't Make a Right...but Three Do
"Forward Motion"	2003	—	—	—	—	—	3	—	—	—	—		Two Lefts Don't Make a Right...but Three Do
"I Celebrate the Day"	2003	—	—	—	—	—	—	—	—	—	—		Deck the Hall, Bruise Your Hand
"Be My Escape"	2004	82	44	— (Note: "Be My Escape" did not enter the Billboard Hot Christian Songs, but peaked at No. 3 on the Billboard Christian CHR Songs chart.)		—	1	—	—	—	—	RIAA: Gold	Mmhmm
"Who I Am Hates Who I've Been"	2005	58	22	32		—	2	—	16	—	—	RIAA: Gold	Mmhmm
"The Truth"	2005	—	—	—	—	—	9	—	—	2	—		Apathetic EP
"High of 75"	2006	—	—	17		—	3	—	—	6	—		Mmhmm
"Must Have Done Something Right"	2006	—	45	—	—	—	—	13	—	—	180		Five Score and Seven Years Ago
"Forgiven"	2006	—	—	13		—	—	—	—	1	—		Five Score and Seven Years Ago
"The Best Thing"	2007	—	48	29		—	—	—	—	—	—		Five Score and Seven Years Ago
"I Need You"	2007	—	—	—	—	—	1	—	—	5	—		Five Score and Seven Years Ago
"Give Until There's Nothing Left"	2007	—	—	17		28	—	—	—	4	—		Five Score and Seven Years Ago
"Devastation and Reform"	2008	—	—	—	—	—	1	—	—	—	—		Five Score and Seven Years Ago
"Forget and Not Slow Down"	2009	—	—	37		—	6	—	— (Note: "Forget and Not Slow Down" did not enter the Canadian Hot 100 or Canada CHR/Top 40, but peaked at number 96 on the Canadian Singles Sales chart.)	—	—		Forget and Not Slow Down
"Therapy"	2009	—	—	46		—	—	—	—	—	—		Forget and Not Slow Down
"That's My Jam" (with Owl City)	2013	—	—	— (Note: "That's My Jam" did not enter the Billboard Hot Christian Songs, but peaked at No. 8 on the Billboard Christian Digital Song Sales chart.)	—	—	—	—	—	—	—		Collapsible Lung
"Look on Up"	2016	—	—	32	—	—	—	—	—	—	—		Non-album single
"Bummin"	2016	—	—	—	—	—	—	—	—	—	—		Air for Free
"Can't Wait for Christmas" (TobyMac featuring Relient K)	2017	—	—	—	40	5	—	—	—	—	—		Light of Christmas
"A Hurt Like That" (Phangs featuring Matt Thiessen and Relient K)	2021	—	—	—	—	—	—	—	—	—	—		I Love Everything You Hate About Yourself
"—" denotes a recording that did not chart or was not released in that territory.

=== Promotional singles ===
List of promotional singles, with selected chart positions, showing year released and album name
Title	Year	Peak chart positions	Album
Title	Year	US Christ Rock	Album
"Softer to Me"	2000	—	Relient K
"I Don't Need a Soul"	2009	3	Forget and Not Slow Down
"PTL"	2013	—	Collapsible Lung
"Collapsible Lung"	2013	—	Collapsible Lung
"Happy Earth Day"	2017	—	Non-album single
"—" denotes a recording that did not chart.

== Other charted songs ==
Title	Year	Peak Chart Positions						Album
Title	Year	US Christ	US Christ Air	US Christ AC	US Christ CHR	US Christ Rock	UK Christ Air	Album
"More Than Uselss"	2005	—	—	—	—	—	1	Mmhmm
"Let It All Out"	2005	—	—	—	—	—	6	Mmhmm
"The Scene and the Herd"	2008	—	—	—	—	4	—	Five Score and Seven Years Ago
"I Just Want You to Know"	2008	—	—	—	18	—	—	The Birds and the Bee Sides
"The Last, The Lost, The Least"	2008	—	—	—	—	7	—	The Birds and the Bee Sides
"Have Yourself a Merry Little Christmas"	2008	11		9	—	—	5	Let it Snow Baby... Let it Reindeer
"I'm Getting Nuttin' For Christmas"	2008	—	—	—	—	—	4	Let it Snow Baby... Let it Reindeer
"12 Days of Christmas"	2010	— (Note: "The Twelve Days of Christmas" did not enter the Billboard Hot Christian Songs, but peaked at No. 40 on the Billboard Christian Digital Song Sales chart.)	—	—	—	—	—	Let it Snow Baby... Let it Reindeer
"God Rest Ye Merry Gentlemen"	2010	—	—	—	—	—	5	'Tis The Season To Be Gotee
"Everybody Wants to Rule the World"	2011	—	—	—	—	11	—	Is for Karaoke
"Don't Blink"	2013	— (Note: "Don't Blink" did not enter the Billboard Hot Christian Songs, but peaked at No. 25 on the Billboard Christian Digital Song Sales chart.)	—	—	—	3	—	Collapsible Lung
"Sleigh Ride"	2014	— (Note: "Sleigh Ride" did not enter the Billboard Hot Christian Songs chart, but peaked at No. 16 on the Billboard Christian Streaming Songs chart.)	—	—	—	—	—	Let it Snow Baby... Let it Reindeer
"Local Construction"	2016	—	—	—	—	—	3	Air for Free
"—" denotes a recording that did not chart or was not released in that territory.

== Other appearances ==
Title	Year	Album
"Can't Wait for Christmas" (TobyMac featuring Relient K)	2022	TobyMac: The Goodness of Christmas
"Ammunition (Relient K version)" (Switchfoot featuring Relient K)	2023	The Beautiful Letdown (Our Version)
"Fast Car" (Rookie of the Year featuring Matt Thiessen and Relient K)	2024	WTF
"Like You" (keepwarm featuring Relient K)	2026	Single

== Music videos ==
Title	Year	Director	Album
"My Girlfriend"	2000	Eric Welch	Relient K
"Pressing On"	2001		The Anatomy of the Tongue in Cheek
"Chap Stick, Chapped Lips, and Things Like Chemistry"	2003	Eliot Lester	Two Lefts Don't Make a Right... But Three Do
"Be My Escape"	2005	Charles Jensen	Mmhmm
"Who I Am Hates Who I've Been"	2005	Jon Watts	Mmhmm
"Must Have Done Something Right"	2007	Marc Webb	Five Score and Seven Years Ago
"The Best Thing"	2007	Barnaby Roper	Five Score and Seven Years Ago
"Sleigh Ride"	2008	Rob Corley, Tom Bancroft, Funny Pages	Let it Snow, Baby... Let it Reindeer
"Mountaintop"	2016	Ryan Hamblin	Air for Free
"Candy Hearts"	2017	Jake Germany	Truly Madly Deeply EP

== Compilation appearances ==
Year	Album	Song(s)	Label
2001	Happy Christmas, Vol. 3	"Santa Claus Is Thumbing to Town"	BEC
2002	Jonah: A VeggieTales Movie Original Movie Soundtrack	"The Pirates Who Don't Do Anything"	Big Idea
2003	Smash-Ups	TobyMac "Yours" vs. Relient K "Pressing On"	Sparrow
2004	VeggieTales: Veggie Rocks!	"The Pirates Who Don't Do Anything"	ForeFront
2005	Punk Goes 80's	"Manic Monday"	Fearless
2005	Happy Christmas, Vol. 4	"I Celebrate the Day"	Tooth & Nail
2006	27th Annual Covenant Hits	"Be My Escape"	CMC Distribution
2006	Freaked!	"Between You and Me" (dc Talk cover)	Gotee
2006	Now That's What I Call Christmas!, 3	"Twelve Days of Christmas"	Sony BMG
2007	Gotee Hits	"Be My Escape" (Radio Mix)	Gotee
2007	Gotee Acoustic	"Who I Am Hates Who I've Been" (Acoustic)	Gotee
2007	Punk Goes Acoustic 2	"Who I Am Hates Who I've Been" (Acoustic)	Fearless
2008	Canada Rocks	"Give Until There's Nothing Left"	CMC Distribution
2008	GMA Canada presents 30th Anniversary Collection	"Be My Escape"	CMC Distribution
2008	The Pirates Who Don't Do Anything: A VeggieTales Movie Original Movie Soundtrack	"The Pirates Who Don't Do Anything"	Big Idea
2010	Freedom: Artists United for International Justice	"What Can I Do?"	International Justice Mission
