= The Bird and the Bee Sides =

EP by Relient K
- Released: July 1, 2008
- Genre: Rock; pop punk; alternative rock
- Length: 71:09
- Label: Gotee
- Producer: Mark Lee Townsend

Relient K chronology
Let It Snow, Baby... Let It Reindeer (2007)	The Bird and the Bee Sides (2008)	Forget and Not Slow Down (2009)

EP cover
- The Nashville Tennis EP cover

The Bird and the Bee Sides is a double EP by the American band Relient K. It was released on July 1, 2008. The double EP was released on a single disc, containing both The Nashville Tennis EP and The Bird and the Bee Sides. It was their last release under Gotee Records, as the group had fulfilled their contract with the label.

The collection debuted at No. 25 on the Billboard 200, selling 20,000 copies in its first week.

== Background ==
The Bird and the Bee Sides was produced by Mark Lee Townsend and mixed by J.R. McNeely, recording at S-S-Studio in Spring Hill, Tennessee.

The Nashville Tennis EP (whose title is a pun on Nashville, Tennessee) includes 13 tracks of new material that allowed the band to explore their sound by channeling country and reggae influences, as well as feature compositions by band members other than Matt Thiessen and Matt Hoopes.

The Bird and the Bee Sides is a collection of rarities or unreleased demos from earlier in the band's career. Thiessen said that the release was to give the band "a little breathing room" before working on their next album.

Speaking about putting the collection together, Thiessen stated, "We were just trying to think of what our fans would want from a b-sides record [...] Along the way, the band decided to include some new tracks, a concept that quickly morphed into 'hey, why doesn't everybody in the band write a song?'."

== Release ==
On May 30, 2008, Relient K announced the release date for The Bird and the Bee Sides and held an online scavenger hunt for tracks that were cut from the EP. The album artwork was also revealed that same day and the scavenger hunt ran from June 16 to June 30 on their MySpace page. The clues lead to "Hope For Every Fallen Man", "Where Do I Go (Acoustic)", and "Between You and Me". Two more songs are intended to be released some time for the scavenger hunt, and were announced to be the demo of "I'm Lion-O" from the band's 1998 demo album All Work & No Play and the unreleased demo of "Sadie Hawkins Dance".

The group posted two songs from the EP, "The Lining Is Silver" and "The Scene and Herd" online for streaming on May 30, 2008. Those who pre-ordered The Bird and the Bee Sides received two instant song downloads, "Up and Up" and "The Lining Is Silver", a Relient K and Gotee Records sticker pack, and a collector's-edition postcard. Released on July 1, the release celebrates Relient K's 10 year history.

== Critical reception ==
Professional ratings
Review scores
Source	Rating
AbsolutePunk.net	(86%)
AllMusic	3.5/5 stars
Alternative Addiction	3/5 stars
Indie Vision Music	7/10
IGN	7.1/10
Jesus Freak Hideout	4.5/5 stars
Punknews.org	3/5 stars
Soul-Audio.com	5.5/10 stars

The Birds and the Bee Sides was met with positive reviews from music critics. Andree Farias of AllMusic described the recording as "an all-around nice gesture -- a more than generous gift to fans and an EP with one of the highest bang-for-buck ratios in the history of modern rock." Chris Fallon of AbsolutePunk stated, "The Nashville Tennis EP half showcases the band's ever-growing pop-based sound, steering further and further away from their initial punk-rooted style found on earlier records. The new material and the b-side collection are interesting to compare, as they both have a glossy production and sound wonderful, but are essentially counterparts in the dynamic they each present to the listener." Alternative Addiction said the EP "isn't a bad listen but it's not a definitive set for the band either."

Chad Grischow of IGN remarked, "it is hard to fault a band for wanting to give too much music to their fans, yet, it is exactly what taints Relient K's latest. The silly scraps on the later half of the effort cheapen the fantastic new cuts, which, in turn, highlight the disposable nature of the leftovers." Josh Taylor of Jesus Freak Hideout wrote, "this is a very enjoyable collection of songs from a band that seems to continually outdo themselves, even when it comes to their between-album EPs. With so much to choose from, it'd be hard to not find something you liked."

== Awards and nominations ==
The Birds and the Bee Sides won the Covenant Award for Modern Rock/Alternative Album of the Year.

== Track listing ==
=== The Nashville Tennis EP ===
All tracks are written by Matt Thiessen, except where noted.

No.	Title	Writer(s)	Length
1.	"Where Do I Go from Here"		2:15
2.	"The Scene and Herd"		2:53
3.	"At Least We Made It This Far"		2:53
4.	"The Last, the Lost, the Least" (vocals by bassist, John Warne)	John Warne	2:25
5.	"The Lining Is Silver"		3:41
6.	"There Was No Thief" (re-recorded version of "The Thief" from the Apathetic EP)		3:22
7.	"No Reaction" (vocals by drummer, Ethan Luck)	Ethan Luck	1:03
8.	"Curl Up and Die"		4:08
9.	"You'll Always Be My Best Friend" (lead vocals by guitarist, Matt Hoopes)	Matt Hoopes, Thiessen	1:39
10.	"There Was Another Time in My Life"		2:51
11.	"Beaming"		1:00
12.	"I Just Want You to Know"		2:57
13.	"Bee Your Man" (vocals by guitarist, Jonathan Schneck)	Jonathan Schneck	1:38
Total length:			32:51

=== The Bird and the Bee Sides ===
No.	Title	Originally from	Length
14.	"Up and Up (Acoustic)"	Must Have Done Something Right EP and Five Score And Seven Years Ago (Wal-Mart exclusive)	4:06
15.	"Wit's All Been Done Before"	Employee of the Month EP	3:30
16.	"The Vinyl Countdown"	The Vinyl Countdown	2:49
17.	"For the Band"	Employee of the Month EP	4:15
18.	"Nothing Without You"	The Vinyl Countdown	4:14
19.	"A Penny Loafer Saved Is a Penny Loafer Earned"	Employee of the Month EP	2:19
20.	"Five Iron Frenzy Is Either Dead or Dying"	The Vinyl Countdown	0:32
21.	"Five Iron Frenzy Is Either Dead or Dying (Wannabe Ska Version)"	The Vinyl Countdown	0:41
22.	"Who I Am Hates Who I've Been (Acoustic)"	Who I Am Hates Who I've Been (single)	3:18
23.	"Here I Go (Demo)"	Previously unreleased	2:34
24.	"The Stenographer (Demo)"	Previously unreleased	2:30
25.	"Jefferson Aeroplane (Demo)"	The Creepy EP	3:58
26.	"Hope for Every Fallen Man (Acoustic)"	Must Have Done Something Right EP and Five Score And Seven Years Ago (Best Buy exclusive)	3:26
Total length:			38:17

Bonus scavenger hunt tracks
No.	Title	Originally from	Length
1.	"Where Do I Go From Here? (Acoustic)"	Previously unreleased	2:54
2.	"Fallen Man"	Must Have Done Something Right (single)	3:47
3.	"Between You and Me"	Freaked!	3:37

== Personnel ==
Credits adapted from album's liner notes.

Relient K

- Matt Thiessen – lead vocals, rhythm guitar, piano, co-producer
- Matt Hoopes – lead guitar, backing vocals
- Brian Pittman – bass (pre-2004 tracks)
- Dave Douglas – drums, backing vocals (pre-2008 tracks)
- John Warne – bass, backing vocals (2005-2008 tracks)
- Jon Schneck – rhythm guitar, backing vocals (2005-2008 tracks)
- Ethan Luck – drums (2008 tracks)

Additional production

- Mark Lee Townsend – producer
- Brett Schoneman (formerly of Philmore) – drums (track 16, 20 & 21)
- Lane Johnson – drums (on "Where Do I Go (Acoustic)")
- Tobin Hyman – A&R coordination
- Sara Marienthal – A&R coordination
- Mike Condo – production coordination
- Davy Baysinger (formerly of Bleach) – artwork

== Charts ==
=== Weekly charts ===
Weekly chart performance for The Birds and the Bee Sides
Chart (2008)	Peak position
US Billboard 200	25
US Top Alternative Albums (Billboard)	9
US Top Christian Albums (Billboard)	1
US Top Rock Albums (Billboard)	12

=== Year-end charts ===
Year-end chart performance for The Birds and the Bee Sides
Chart (2008)	Position
US Christian Albums (Billboard)	26
