= List of Relient K tours and live performances =

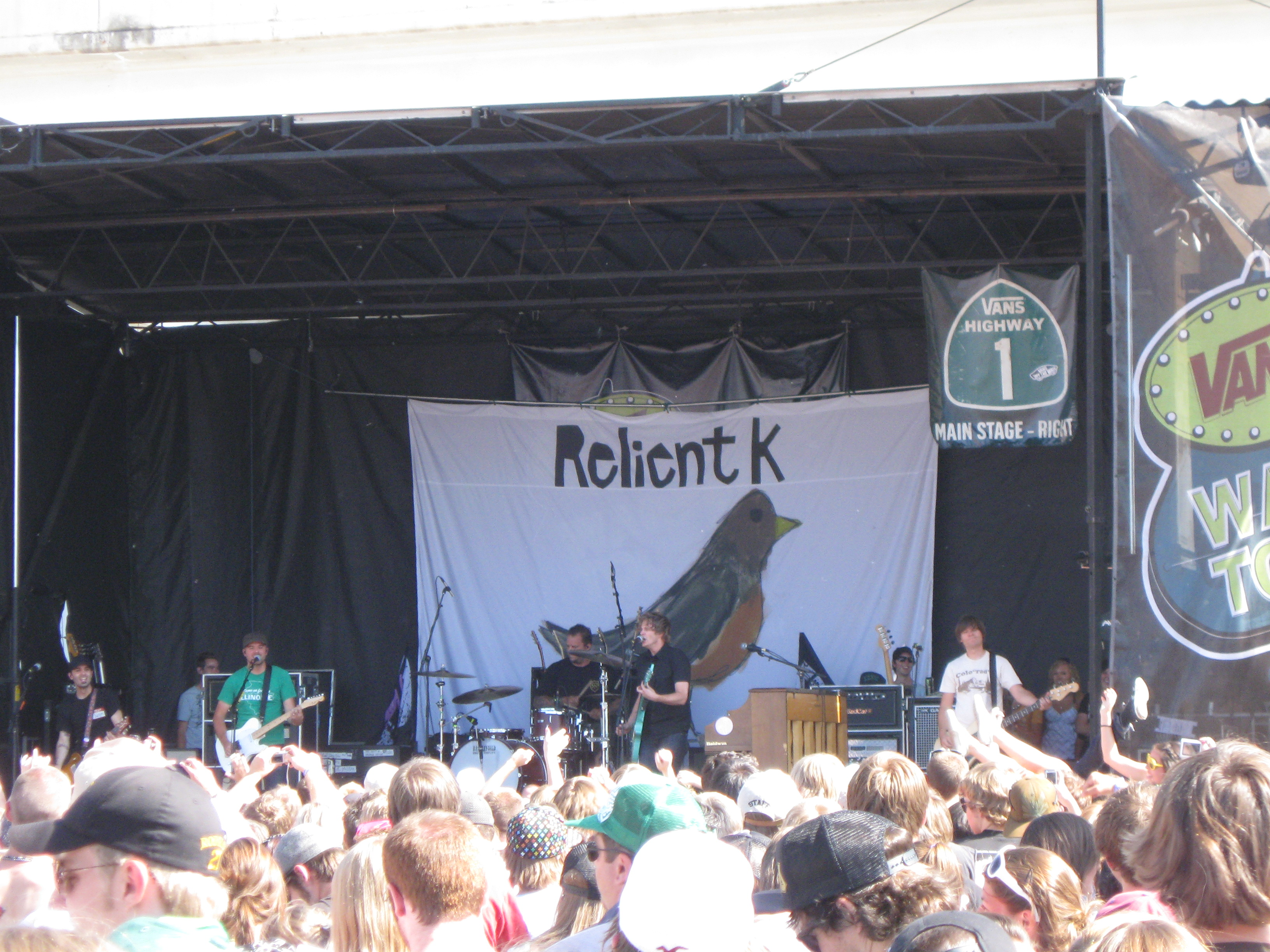
Relient K performing at a concert in 2008 during the Vans Warped Tour

- In 2004 and 2012 Relient K headlined the annual Parachute Music Festival in New Zealand.
- Relient K performed in the 2005, 2008, 2011, and performed on three dates on the 2013 Vans Warped Tour.
- Between September and November 2006, Relient K played on the Nintendo Fusion Tour with Hawthorne Heights, Emery, Plain White T's, and The Sleeping.
- The band also took part in McDonald's Summer 2007 music tour. Every band involved in the tour has the chance to be involved in a future McDonald's ad. Votes by viewers will be counted to decide who will win. All live shows are available for viewing.
- Relient K and Switchfoot both played at the Los Angeles premiere of the movie Evan Almighty on June 22, 2007. They also played at the Lizard Fair in Midland, Michigan on August 15, 2007 with Chris Daughtry.
- "Must Have Done Something Right" and "The Best Thing" were performed on Late Night with Conan O'Brien and The Tonight Show with Jay Leno respectively. Relient K appeared again on The Tonight Show with Jay Leno on December 17, 2008. They performed their cover "Sleigh Ride" from Let It Snow, Baby... Let It Reindeer. Actor Tom Wilson accompanied the band.
- As of September 8, 2008, Relient K was on tour with Ludo, featuring This Providence and House of Heroes. The tour was title "The Uncle Fest Tour" and was during the month of October, with a few in early November. The last tour date was November 2.
- In November and early December 2008, Relient K joined TobyMac and Family Force 5 on a month-long tour called The Winter Wonder Slam Tour 2008.
- Relient K toured with Runner Runner and Owl City in May 2009.
- Relient K toured throughout Australia in September 2009 alongside Lecrae, Reggie Dabbs and Australian band New Empire as part of an annual national Youth Alive event.
- Relient K toured with Barcelona and Copeland that started on October 1, 2009, in New Haven, CT called the Three-Hour Tour, named after a reference to the theme song of the TV sitcom, Gilligan's Island.
- In September 2009, Relient K made an appearance at Big Exo Day, and played several songs including some from the new album 'forget and not slow down'.
- In late 2009, Relient K went on the 2009 Winter Wonder Slam tour with tobyMac. Early on, Matt Hoopes left the tour for a family matter. On December 16, Matt Thiessen's mother had a severe heart attack and he too left the tour. Tim Skipper of House of Heroes filled Matt's place for the four remaining shows. Relient K had never lost the two Matts before on tour.
- Relient K opened for Paramore's 2010 Spring tour.
- Relient K played select dates on the 2010 Honda Civic Tour.
- Opening for Paramore's 2010 New Zealand/Australia tour starting from October 7, 2010 together with New Zealand band Jury and the Saints.
- Relient K toured with Sherwood and Deas Vail December 1–17, 2010 and playing acoustic sets.
- Relient K toured on the Vans Warped Tour 2011 from June 24 through August 14.
- As a part of "Faith Day," Relient K performed a post-game show in Cleveland, Ohio when the Cleveland Indians faced the Seattle Mariners on May 14, 2011.
- Relient K toured around the United States with Motion City Soundtrack and Driver Friendly in 2013
- Relient K toured the United States in 2014 in commemoration of the 10th anniversary tour of their 2004 album, Mmhmm
- Relient K toured with Switchfoot on the Looking For America Tour in 2016. Relient K continued to tour with Switchfoot on the Still Looking For America 2our in 2017.
- Relient K toured again in 2022 on the “Um Yeah Tour” where Dave Douglas joined on the drums, Ethan Luck played bass and Joh Schneck once again took up his position on electric guitar and xylophone. The band was supported by Semler who performed a solo acoustic set.
