= Forgiven (Relient K song) =

Single by Relient K

from the album Five Score and Seven Years Ago
- Released: December 1, 2006
- Recorded: 2006
- Genre: Christian rock
- Length: 4:05
- Label: Capitol; Gotee
- Songwriter: Matthew Thiessen
- Producer: Howard Benson

Relient K singles chronology
"Must Have Done Something Right" (2006)	"Forgiven" (2006)	"The Best Thing" (2007)

Forgiven is a song by American rock band Relient K. It was released as the first Christian radio single and second overall from their fifth studio album, Five Score and Seven Years Ago. The song was officially released to Christian radio on December 1, 2006.

The song was also included in the compilation album WOW Hits 2008.

== Background ==
"Forgiven" is described as a darker track about redemption and forgiveness. According to the liner notes from WOW Hits 2008, Matthew Thiessen wrote the song from a rough situation about a friend who "said some things about me that weren't totally kind and weren't totally accurate." Instead of wanting to worsen the situation, he still decided to forgiven his friend and described writing the song as "therapeutic."

In an interview with Christian Retailing magazine, Thiessen said of the song, "Sometimes we have problems forgiving each other. Everyone in the entire world is guilty of something. The whole ides is 'judge not lest you be judged'."

== Composition ==
"Forgiven" was written by Matthew Thiessen and produced by Howard Benson. According to the sheet music published at Musicnotes.com, by Alfred Music Publishing, the track runs at 132 BPM and is in the key of C minor. Thiessen's range in the song spans from the notes A♭3 to F5.

== Chart performance ==
"Forgiven" peaked at number 13 on the US Hot Christian Songs chart. It was the fourth most played Christian Hit Radio song in 2007 according to R&R magazine.

== Personnel ==
Credits for "Forgiven" adapted from album's liner notes.

Relient K

- Matthew Thiessen – lead vocals, euphonium, French horn
- Matt Hoopes – guitars, backing vocals
- Jon Schneck – guitars, backing vocals
- John Warne – bass guitar, backing vocals
- Dave Douglas – drums, backing vocals

Additional musicians

- Howard Benson – keyboards, programming
- Ned Brower – additional vocals

Production

- Howard Benson – producer
- Mike Plotnikoff – recording
- Hatsukazu "Hatch" Inagaki – assistant engineer
- Paul DeCarli – editing
- Chris Lord-Alge – mixing
- Keith Armstrong – mixing assistant
- Nik Karpen – mixing assistant
- Ted Jensen – mastering at Sterling Sound (New York City, New York)

== Charts ==
=== Weekly charts ===
Weekly chart performance for "Forgiven"
Chart (2007)	Peak position
UK Christian Songs (Cross Rhythms)	1
US Hot Christian Songs (Billboard)	13

=== Year-end charts ===
Year-end chart performance for "Forgiven"
Chart (2007)	Peak position
UK Christian Songs (Cross Rhythms)	14
US Christian CHR Songs (Radio & Records)	4
