= I Need You (Relient K song) =

Single by Relient K

from the album Five Score and Seven Years Ago
- Released: July 2007
- Recorded: 2006
- Genre: Christian rock
- Length: 3:18
- Label: Capitol; Gotee
- Songwriter: Matthew Thiessen
- Producer: Howard Benson

Relient K singles chronology
"The Best Thing" (2007)	"I Need You" (2007)	"Give Until There's Nothing Left" (2007)

"I Need You" is a song by American rock band Relient K. It was released in July 2007, as the second Christian radio single and fourth overall from their fifth studio album, Five Score and Seven Years Ago. The reached No. 1 on Radio and Records Christian Rock Songs chart. In February 2008, the single was nominated for a dove award in the "Rock Song of the Year" category.

== Background and composition ==
"I Need You" was written by Matt Thiessen and produced by Howard Benson. According to the sheet music published at Musicnotes.com, by Alfred Music Publishing, the track runs at 190 BPM and is in the key of C-sharp minor. Thiessen's range in the song spans from the notes D♯4 to B5. Lyrically, the song is about Thiessen's "desperate plea for answered prayer and restoration" to God.

== Critical reception ==
Jesus Freak Hideout ranked the song at fourth on their "Relient K's Top 20 Songs" list, writing, "this is an excellent song much deserving of top twenty Relient K status. One of the harder rocking songs they ever did."

== Awards ==
In 2008, the song was nominated for a Dove Award for Rock Recorded Song of the Year at the 39th GMA Dove Awards.

== Personnel ==
Credits for "I Need You" adapted from album's liner notes.

Relient K

- Matthew Thiessen – lead vocals, euphonium, French horn
- Matt Hoopes – guitars, backing vocals
- Jon Schneck – guitars, backing vocals
- John Warne – bass guitar, backing vocals
- Dave Douglas – drums, backing vocals

Additional musicians

- Howard Benson – keyboards, programming
- Josh Auer – additional vocals
- Ned Brower – additional vocals

Production

- Howard Benson – producer
- Mike Plotnikoff – recording
- Hatsukazu "Hatch" Inagaki – assistant engineer
- Paul DeCarli – editing
- Chris Lord-Alge – mixing
- Keith Armstrong – mixing assistant
- Nik Karpen – mixing assistant
- Ted Jensen – mastering at Sterling Sound (New York City, New York)
- Mark Vangool – guitar technician
- Jon Nicholson – drum technician

== Charts ==
=== Weekly charts ===
Weekly chart performance for "I Need You"
Chart (2007)	Peak position
UK Christian Songs (Cross Rhythms)	5
US Christian Rock Songs (Radio and Records)	1

=== Year-end charts ===
Year-end chart performance for "I Need You"
Chart (2007)	Peak position
UK Christian Songs (Cross Rhythms)	69
