= Must Have Done Something Right =

Single by Relient K

from the album Five Score and Seven Years Ago
- Released: November 28, 2006
- Recorded: 2006
- Genre: Christian rock; pop rock
- Length: 3:19
- Label: Capitol; Gotee
- Songwriter: Matthew Thiessen
- Producer: Howard Benson

Relient K singles chronology
"High of 75" (2006)	"Must Have Done Something Right" (2006)	"Forgiven" (2006)

"Must Have Done Something Right" is a song by American rock band Relient K. It was released as the lead single from their fifth studio album, Five Score and Seven Years Ago. The song was released to iTunes on November 28, 2006. The single comes with a bonus song, "(Hope for Every) Fallen Man". The song was officially released to radio in January 2007, along with the music video, which was shot in December 2006 and released on February 10, 2007.

The song's length is 3:07 on the single, but 3:19 in the video and on the album. This is because the song's ending is extended for the album and the video so that it goes another chorus and into a fade out at the end, as opposed to the abrupt ending for the single.

== Background ==
The song was released for digital download on November 28, 2006. Matthew Thiessen explained the song in an interview with the Christian Broadcasting Network, stating, "This song represents something that I've wanted to create for a long time. It's not a political commentary or a tear jerking emotion-piece, it's just a feel good, fun song."

The song is downloadable for Rock Band 3.

== Composition ==
"Must Have Done Something Right" was written by Matthew Thiessen and produced by Howard Benson. According to the sheet music published at Musicnotes.com, by Alfred Music Publishing, the track runs at 136 BPM and is in the key of A major. Thiessen's range in the song spans from the notes A3 to F#5.

Thiessen wrote the song at 3am as a "'this is so happy' type of thing." Lyrically, the song is an ode to young love between a girl and an "undeserving guy" with an opening line of, "We should get jerseys, because we make a good team. But yours would look better than mine, because you're out of my league." Musically, the track leans into a similar direction to "The Truth".

== Critical reception ==
Professional ratings
Review scores
Source	Rating
Jesus Freak Hideout	4/5 stars

Josh Naylor of Jesus Freak Hideout gave the song a positive review, stating, "Perhaps a bit cliché in places, but the song actually pokes fun at itself in that aspect, with Thiessen openly admitting how cliché his professions of love really are [...] The one word to describe it is catchy. However, Relient K lays it on with guitar crunches that let you know that this is not pop music."

== Music video ==
The video was directed by Marc Webb and was released on February 10, 2007. It is primarily focused on Matt Thiessen's efforts to reclaim a soccer ball his girlfriend (Jonna Walsh) kicks near the beginning of the song. During sporadic shots, the band (with Thiessen) plays (alternately) in a bowling alley and in front of a lake. The video features quick shots and transitions between scenes and locations as the camera follows the flight of the ball. Thiessen challenges a tamales vendor, a police officer, a little girl, a library student, and a construction worker, among others, to get the ball and the girl's attention.

== Track listing ==
Digital download
No.	Title	Length
1.	"Must Have Done Something Right" (radio edit)	3:07
2.	"Fallen Man"	3:47

Must Have Done Something Right EP
No.	Title	Length
1.	"Must Have Done Something Right"	3:20
2.	"Apathetic Way To Be"	3:19
3.	"Up and Up" (acoustic)	4:07
4.	"Fallen Man" (acoustic)	3:27

== Personnel ==
Credits for "Must Have Done Something Right" adapted from album's liner notes.

Relient K

- Matthew Thiessen – lead vocals
- Matt Hoopes – guitars, backing vocals
- Jon Schneck – guitars, backing vocals
- John Warne – bass guitar, backing vocals
- Dave Douglas – drums, backing vocals

Additional musicians

- Howard Benson – keyboards, programming
- Hatsukazu Inagaki – tuba

Production

- Howard Benson – producer
- Mike Plotnikoff – recording
- Hatsukazu "Hatch" Inagaki – assistant engineer
- Paul DeCarli – editing
- Chris Lord-Alge – mixing
- Keith Armstrong – mixing assistant
- Nik Karpen – mixing assistant
- Ted Jensen – mastering at Sterling Sound (New York City, New York)

== Charts ==
Chart performance for "Must Have Done Something Right"
Chart (2007)	Peak position
Australia Hitseekers (ARIA)	13
Ukraine Airplay (Tophit)	180
US CHR/Pop Top 50 (Radio & Records)	45

== Release history ==
Release dates for "Must Have Done Something Right"
Region	Date	Format	Label	Ref.
Various	November 28, 2006	Digital download	Capitol; Gotee	
United States	January 8, 2007	Contemporary hit radio	Capitol; Gotee	
Australia	April 27, 2007	CD single	Capitol; Gotee	
