= Five Score and Seven Years Ago =

Studio album by Relient K
- Released: March 6, 2007
- Recorded: June–August 2006
- Studios: Dark Horse Recording (Franklin, Tennessee); S-S Studio (Spring Hill, Tennessee); Bay 7 Studios (Valley Village, California); Sparky Dark Studio (Calabasas, California).
- Genres: Christian rock; pop punk; alternative rock
- Length: 51:12
- Labels: Capitol; Gotee
- Producers: Howard Benson; Mark Lee Townsend; Matt Thiessen

Relient K chronology
Apathetic EP (2005)	Five Score and Seven Years Ago (2007)	Must Have Done Something Right EP (2007)

Singles from Five Score and Seven Years Ago
- 1. "Must Have Done Something Right" Released: November 28, 2006; 2. "Forgiven" Released: December 1, 2006; 3. "The Best Thing" Released: April 10, 2007; 4. "I Need You" Released: July 2007; 5. "Give Until There's Nothing Left" Released: July 6, 2007; 6. "Devastation and Reform" Released: January 2008

Five Score and Seven Years Ago is the fifth studio album by Christian rock band Relient K. It was released on March 6, 2007, and is the band's final album on both Capitol Records and Gotee Records. It is the first full-length album by the band to feature bassist John Warne (replacing founding member Brian Pittman) and guitarist Jon Schneck. Furthermore, it would serve as drummer Dave Douglas' last album with the band until Air for Free (2016). Future drummer Ethan Luck makes his debut on the track "Deathbed".

== Background and recording ==
For Five Score and Seven Years Ago, the album was not only produced by Mark Lee Townsend and Matt Thiessen, but also by Howard Benson. Explaining the decision to work with another producer, Thiessen said, "I wanted somebody to say... I'm like, 'I want to put that part in the song' and he's like, 'That part doesn't make sense, it's not going in the song.' Y'know? I wanted somebody to tell me what to do. That's kind of what he's known for I guess. He's very blunt about his opinion and whatnot, and it worked really well." Guitarist Matt Hoopes stated he was "pretty nervous" about working with another producer, said in the end "was a good experience." It is the first album the band recorded with members John Warne and Jon Schneck.

Most of the album was recorded in Los Angeles with Benson, at Bay 7 Studio and Sparky Dark Studio. The rest of the album would be recorded at S-S Studio in Spring Hill, Tennessee. The album was mixed by Chris Lord-Alge at Resonate Music Studio in Burbank, California, and by J.R. McNeely at Sound Kitchen in Franklin, Tennessee. It was mastered by Ted Jensen at Sterling Sound in New York City.

It was recorded from June to August 2006. The album had a scheduled release date for the fall of 2006, ultimately leading to the group rushing the recording process. However, the label decided to delay it for "some reasons," according to Hoopes. Blending together power pop and pop punk, influences of the Beach Boys, Blink-182 and Fountains of Wayne can be heard.

== Composition ==
Speaking about writing the album, Thiessen stated, "I really love to not be serious all the time, even when I am being serious. It's the same flavor but we try to stretch it a little bit. It's still melodic, it's still rock 'n' roll, there are still a lot of dynamics. But at the same time, we're trying to write a bit differently, lyrically." Tracks such as "Devastation and Reform", "Bite My Tongue" and "Up and Up", offer a side of redemption, while songs like "Must Have Done Something Right" is described as a feel good song and "The Best Thing" as a "positive" track. "Pleading the Fifth" was the last song Thiessen wrote for the album as "something 'dumb'" he needed to fit the album title. He explained his vision behind the track stating, "I always wanted to do a song where I did the drums with my voice. And then I didn't want to just put them on the track, I wanted to get a kit and trigger all the drum sounds while you're playing it. So it's like you're actually playing my voice as a drum kit. So that was the goal of a song, cause I wanted it to be an a cappella song and my voice as the drums."

The earliest written track for the album is "Faking My Own Suicide", which Thiessen wrote in 2001. He never put the song on a record as he felt it was a bit controversial. He said, "I thought Christian audiences would never be able to accept it [...] I know Matt's (Hoopes) mom was like 'Even saying the word 'suicide' in a song, people have experiences with that, like a loved one or whatever, it's going to conjure up some ill feelings,' but the song isn't meaning to go in that direction. Obviously, it seems dark, but it's not." The last track "Deathbed", features Jon Foreman of Switchfoot and was originally written about Thiessen picturing himself of what it would be like lying on his deathbed. However, he thought the idea was bad and re-wrote it and created a fictitious character going through the stages of life.

== Title and cover art ==
According to lead singer, Matt Thiessen, the album was created with a "Five" theme, as it is the band's fifth album, and for the first time Relient K has five members on an album. The "Seven Years Ago" links with the fact that the group's first album was created seven years prior to the release of this album, making for five albums in seven years. It also ties in with the famous line, "Four score and seven years ago", delivered by Abraham Lincoln in the Gettysburg Address. Lincoln is addressed in the first track, "Plead the Fifth".

== Release ==
"Must Have Done Something Right" was released to iTunes on November 28, 2006, as the lead single from the album, along with a non-album bonus song titled "Fallen Man," also sometimes referred to as "(Hope for Every) Fallen Man." The album's second single, "Forgiven," was released for the Christian radio market on December 1. The music video for "Must Have Done Something Right" was posted online on February 10, 2007. Five Score and Seven Years Ago was released on March 6, 2007, through Capitol. From early March to late May, the band went on a tour of the U.S. with support from Mae and Sherwood. During this trek, they appeared at The Bamboozle festival. On April 10, 2007, "The Best Thing" was released as the album's third single. On June 6, the music video for the song was posted online. In July, the band release two singles to Christian radio, "I Need You" and "Give Until There's Nothing Left". The sixth and final single "Devastation and Reform" was serviced to Christian radio in January 2008.

A special edition of Five Score and Seven Years Ago was also released, including a bonus DVD with roughly thirty minutes of acoustic performances shot in the Capitol A Studios and including track-to-track interviews with the band. Also included is a making-of feature on the "Must Have Done Something Right" music video as well as the video itself, which was directed by Marc Webb. The album's cover also came with a special slip-cover that outlined the band members in orange drawings. From mid-October to early December, the group went on a co-headlining US tour with Switchfoot, dubbed The Appetite for Construction Tour. Between June and August 2008, the band performed on the 2008 edition of Warped Tour. In October and November, the band went on tour with This Providence, Ludo and House of Heroes. In November and December, the band went on the Winter Wonder-Slam Tour in the US with TobyMac. During the tour, the band performed Christmas songs alongside their regular songs.

== Reception ==
Professional ratings
Review scores
Source	Rating
AbsolutePunk.net	(85%)
AllMusic	4.5/5 stars
Blender	3/5 stars
Christianity Today	4.5/5 stars
Cross Rhythms	10/10 squares
IGN	5.9/10
Jesus Freak Hideout	4.5/5 stars
The Music Box	1.5/5 stars
Rolling Stone	2.5/5 stars
Spin	2.5/5 stars

The album was met with generally positive reviews from music critics. Tony Pascarella of AbsolutePunk.net stated, "It expands on the happier (yet musically grittier) side of Mmhmm without losing any of the band's trademark fun [...] Relient K consistently outdo themselves, and Five Score and Seven Years Ago sets the bar higher yet." Jared Johnson of AllMusic said the group "showed that a punk-pop record could truly be innovative and memorable with Five Score." Alternative Addiction rewarded the album a 4.5 out of 5 star rating and praised the producing efforts of Howard Benson stating, "the work on Five Score and Seven Years Ago is some of the best production, some of the most polished work, maybe ever. The production value of this alone makes this album a must listen." Chart Attack wrote a mixed review for the album, "Five Score and Seven Years Ago finds the group writing with a broader scope, using complex harmonies and grandiose piano arrangements to flesh out their songs. The problem is, they always fall back on formulaic structures and singer Matt Thiessen's breathy, one-dimensional delivery. Symptomatic of these issues is 'I'm Taking You With Me'. Its 'whoa-oh' choruses and predictable melodies have already been done to death by this band and countless others."

Russ Breimeier of Christianity Today remarked, "Their new album isn't really a departure, remaining true to the power pop and punk rock that they do so well. Most of their hallmarks are here, due largely to Thiessen's gift for irresistible melodies and clever lyrics. But the band sounds even tighter with a new bassist and guitarist since 2004's Mmhmm, and now all the members contribute to the vocal harmonies." He also said the group benefited from the production work of Benson. Tony Cummings of Cross Rhythms gave a similar review writing, "bringing in a second guitarist has enabled the lads from Canton, Ohio to experiment with a broader musical palate with piano in particular adding a new dimension to those crunching guitar rhythms. It is also due in part to the production with both mainstream maestro Howard Benson and Mark Townsend. Both rise to the challenge in taking the band's sound beyond pogoing popdom with an expansion of musical textures." Josh Taylor of Jesus Freak Hideout said, "Still, the fact remains, Thiessen keeps maturing as a wordsmith. You would think eventually the guy would lose some steam, but it is simply not the case. Five Score and Seven Years Ago goes down as another landmark record for the Canton, Ohio boys, and is easily one of the best of 2007, thus far." Tom Whitson of The Music Zine gave the album a 4 out of 5 star rating, describing the record as "a pretty great album with some laughs along the way if you listen out amongst the more serious and dark aspects."

A mixed review came from Chad Grischow of IGN, who felt the album was "generic," highlighting "I Need You", "Devastation and Reform" and "Faking My Own Suicide" as examples. He also criticized the "bland songwriting" on the tracks, "I'm Taking You With Me" and "Must Have Done Something Right". However, he praised "Deathbed" as the album's "most engaging song" that "holds your interest from beginning to end." Overall, he said the album "is too generic for Relient K's, or the listeners', own good. Despite their efforts to toughen up much of it music with a harder edge, the album fails to separate itself from the hundreds of other similar albums released over the past few years." Shawn Conner of The Georgia Straight also wrote the album a mixed review, stating it "works at least half the time, usually when the band avoids emo clichés like angst-ridden lead and shouty background vocals that erupt into pimply choruses." Michael Cooney of The Music Box wrote a negative review for the album, calling it "a colossal disappointment" and said that the band "apparently has elected to abandon both its previous lyrical charm and its musical sensitivity in favor of constructing an album that sadly sounds just like everything else on the radio."

BuzzFeed included the album at No. 36 on the website's "36 Pop Punk Albums You Need To Hear Before You F——ing Die" list. Indie Vision Music listed it as "The Best of 2007: Favorite Hits From 10 Years Ago."

== Commercial performance ==
Five Score and Seven Years Ago debuted at number six on the Billboard 200, selling 64,000 copies in its first week. The album also topped the US Christian Albums chart for three weeks. As of July 11, 2007, it has sold 152,560 copies in the US and over 750,000 copies worldwide.

== Track listing ==
All tracks are written by Matt Thiessen.

Standard edition
No.	Title	Length
1.	"Pleading the Fifth" (a cappella)	1:13
2.	"Come Right Out and Say It"	3:00
3.	"I Need You"	3:18
4.	"The Best Thing"	3:28
5.	"Forgiven"	4:05
6.	"Must Have Done Something Right"	3:19
7.	"Give Until There's Nothing Left"	3:27
8.	"Devastation and Reform"	3:41
9.	"I'm Taking You with Me"	3:28
10.	"Faking My Own Suicide"	3:23
11.	"Crayons Can Melt on Us for All I Care"	0:12
12.	"Bite My Tongue"	3:30
13.	"Up and Up"	4:03
14.	"Deathbed" (featuring Jon Foreman of Switchfoot)	11:05
Total length:		51:12

Bonus tracks

Wal-Mart Downloads

- "Up and Up (Acoustic Version)"
- "Devastation and Reform (Video) [This is now available on iTunes in High-Quality iTunes Plus]"

Best Buy Exclusive Download

- "Fallen Man (Acoustic Version)"

iTunes Exclusive Download

- "Sloop John B" (Beach Boys cover)

=== DVD bonus tracks ===
The deluxe edition of the album features a DVD with six acoustic bonus tracks, recorded at the Capitol Studios.

1. "I So Hate Consequences" (includes a piano-only chorus of "Life After Death and Taxes (Failure II)")
2. "Who I Am Hates Who I've Been"
3. "Faking My Own Suicide"
4. "Sloop John B"
5. "Give Until There's Nothing Left"
6. "Devastation and Reform"

The DVD also features the making of the video "Must Have Done Something Right" and the video itself.

== Credits ==
Credits adapted from album's liner notes.

Relient K

- Matt Thiessen – lead vocals, acoustic piano, organ, toy piano, guitars, trombone, trumpet, euphonium, French horn, penny whistle, percussion, horns (14)
- Matt Hoopes – guitars, banjo, mandolin, backing vocals
- Jon Schneck – guitars, backing vocals
- John Warne – bass guitar, backing vocals
- Dave Douglas – drums, backing vocals, additional vocals (8)

Additional personnel

- Howard Benson – Hammond B3 organ (1, 11, 14), keyboards (2–10, 12, 13), programming (2–10, 12, 13)
- Marc Vangool – pedal steel guitar (10)
- Paul DeCarli – harmonica (10)
- Ethan Luck – moon drums (14)
- Mark Lee Townsend – claps (1), stomps (1), ukulele (14), percussion (14), vocals (14)
- Hatsukazu Inagaki – tuba (6)
- Carol Rabinowitz – cello (14)
- Chris Carmichael – viola (14), violin (14)
- Josh Auer – additional vocals (3)
- Ned Brower – additional vocals (3, 5)
- Jon Foreman – vocals (14)

Production

- Jamie Feldman – A&R
- Mark Lee Townsend – producer (1, 11, 14), engineer (1, 11, 14)
- Matt Thiessen – producer (1, 11, 14)
- Howard Benson – producer (2–10, 12, 13)
- Mike Plotnikoff – recording (2–10, 12, 13)
- Hatsukazu "Hatch" Inagaki – assistant engineer (2–10, 12, 13)
- Paul DeCarli – Pro Tools editing
- J.R. McNeely – mixing (1, 11, 14)
- Chris Lord-Alge – mixing (2–10, 12, 13)
- Adam Deane – mix assistant (1, 11, 14)
- Keith Armstrong – mix assistant (2–10, 12, 13)
- Nik Karpen – mix assistant (2–10, 12, 13)
- Ted Jensen – mastering at Sterling Sound (New York City, New York)
- Eric Roinestad – art direction
- Megan Steinman – art direction
- Sunja Park – design
- Ben Watts – photography
- Jeff Risden – management
- Mark Vangool – guitar technician
- Jon Nicholson – drum technician

== Charts ==
=== Weekly charts ===
Weekly chart performance for Five Score and Seven Years Ago
Chart (2007)	Peak position
Canadian Albums (Nielsen)	32
Canadian Alternative Albums (Nielsen)	11
US Billboard 200	6
US Top Christian Albums (Billboard)	1
US Top Rock Albums (Billboard)	3

=== Year-end charts ===
Year-end chart performance for Five Score and Seven Years Ago
Chart (2007)	Position
US Christian Albums (Billboard)	7
