= High of 75 =

Single by Relient K

from the album Mmhmm
- Released: June 2, 2006
- Studio: Dark Horse Recording (Nashville, TN)
- Genre: Pop punk
- Length: 2:27
- Label: Capitol; Gotee
- Songwriter: Matt Thiessen
- Producers: Matt Thiessen; Mark Lee Townsend

Relient K singles chronology
"The Truth" (2005)	"High of 75" (2006)	"Must Have Done Something Right" (2006)

"High of 75" is a song by American Christian rock band Relient K. It was released as the third and final single from their fourth studio album, Mmhmm. The song was serviced to Christian radio on June 2, 2006.

The song peaked at number 17 on the US Hot Christian Songs chart. It also reached number three on the US Christian Rock Songs chart and was the seventeenth most played song on Christian Hit Radio stations in 2006 according to Radio & Records.

== Composition and lyrics ==
"High of 75" was written by Matt Thiessen and produced by Mark Lee Townsend. Thiessen also co-produced the track. Recorded at Dark Horse Recording in Nashville, Tennessee, it was mixed by Tom Lord-Alge, who worked with the band after they had enough money to work with him.

The song is about the experience of ups and downs in life, using an extended metaphor of the weather to refer to the singer's mood: "And lately the weather has been so bi-polar and consequently so have I/ ...But now I'm/ Sunny with a high of 75/ Since You took my heavy heart and made it light/ And it's funny how you find you enjoy your life/ When you're happy to be alive."

== Critical reception ==
In a 2021 list of the "Top 25 Relient K Songs", Josh Balogh of Jesus Freak Hideout ranked the song at 24th.

== Personnel ==
Credits for "High of 75" adapted from album's liner notes.

Relient K

- Matthew Thiessen – lead vocals, acoustic piano, keyboards, guitars, percussion
- Matt Hoopes – guitars, backing vocals
- Brian Pittman – bass guitar
- Dave Douglas – drums, backing vocals

Production

- Mark Lee Townsend – producer, additional engineering
- Joe Marlett – engineer
- Michael Modesto – second engineer
- Dave Salley – second engineer
- Tom Lord-Alge – mixing

== Charts ==
=== Weekly charts ===
Weekly chart performance for "High of 75"
Chart (2005–06)	Peak position
UK Christian Songs (Cross Rhythms)	6
US Hot Christian Songs (Billboard)	17
US Christian Rock (Radio & Records)	3

=== Year-end charts ===
2005 year-end chart performance for "High of 75"
Chart (2005)	Peak position
UK Christian Songs (Cross Rhythms)	80

2006 year-end chart performance for "High of 75"
Chart (2006)	Peak position
US Christian CHR (Radio & Records)	17

== Release history ==
Release history for "High of 75"
Region	Date	Format	Label	Ref.
United States	June 2, 2006	Christian radio	Gotee	
