= Give Until There's Nothing Left =

Single by Relient K

from the album Five Score and Seven Years Ago
- Released: July 6, 2007
- Recorded: 2006
- Genre: Christian rock; alternative rock
- Length: 3:27
- Label: Capitol; Gotee
- Songwriter: Matthew Thiessen
- Producer: Howard Benson

Relient K singles chronology
"I Need You" (2007)	"Give Until There's Nothing Left" (2007)	"Forget and Not Slow Down" (2009)

"Give Until There's Nothing Left" is a song by American rock band Relient K. It was released as the fifth and final single from their fifth studio album, Five Score and Seven Years Ago. It was released to Christian radio on July 6, 2007. The song peaked at No. 17 on the Billboard Hot Christian Songs chart.

== Composition ==
"Give Until There's Nothing Left" was written by Matthew Thiessen and produced by Howard Benson. According to the sheet music published at Musicnotes.com, by Alfred Music Publishing, the track runs at 105 BPM and is in the key of A major. Thiessen's range in the song spans from the notes E4 to A5.

Lyrically, the finds Thiessen singing about unconditional love, "Sometimes it seems like all I ever do is ask for things until I ask too much of you/But that is not the way I want to live... I'll just give until there's nothing else."

== Chart performance ==
"Give Until There's Nothing Left" peaked at number 17 on the US Hot Christian Songs chart. The single was the 20th most played song on Christian Hit Radio stations in 2007 according to R&R magazine.

== Personnel ==
Credits for "Give Until There's Nothing Left" adapted from album's liner notes.

Relient K

- Matthew Thiessen – lead vocals, euphonium, French horn
- Matt Hoopes – guitars, backing vocals
- Jon Schneck – guitars, backing vocals
- John Warne – bass guitar, backing vocals
- Dave Douglas – drums, backing vocals

Additional musicians

- Howard Benson – keyboards, programming
- Hatsukazu Inagaki – tuba

Production

- Howard Benson – producer
- Mike Plotnikoff – recording
- Hatsukazu "Hatch" Inagaki – assistant engineer
- Paul DeCarli – editing
- Chris Lord-Alge – mixing
- Keith Armstrong – mixing assistant
- Nik Karpen – mixing assistant
- Ted Jensen – mastering at Sterling Sound (New York City, New York)

== Charts ==
=== Weekly charts ===
Weekly chart performance for "Give Until There's Nothing Left"
Chart (2007–08)	Peak position
UK Christian Songs (Cross Rhythms)	4
US Christian AC (Billboard)	28
US Hot Christian Songs (Billboard)	17

=== Year-end charts ===
2007 year-end chart performance for "Give Until There's Nothing Left"
Chart (2007)	Peak position
US Christian CHR Songs (Radio & Records)	20

2008 year-end chart performance for "Give Until There's Nothing Left"
Chart (2008)	Peak position
Singapore Airplay (Mediacorp)	83
UK Christian Songs (Cross Rhythms)	55

== Release history ==
Release dates for "Give Until There's Nothing Left"
Region	Date	Format	Label	Ref.
United States	July 6, 2007	Christian CHR	Capitol; Gotee	
