= Who I Am Hates Who I've Been =

Single by Relient K

from the album Mmhmm
- Released: June 27, 2005
- Studio: Dark Horse Recording Studio; Franklin, Tennessee
- Genre: Pop punk; Christian rock; emo
- Length: 3:53
- Label: Gotee; Capitol
- Songwriter: Matt Thiessen
- Producers: Mark Lee Townsend; Matt Thiessen

Relient K singles chronology
"Be My Escape" (2004)	"Who I Am Hates Who I've Been" (2005)	"The Truth" (2005)

Music video
- "Who I Am Hates Who I've Been" on YouTube

"Who I Am Hates Who I've Been" is a song by American Christian rock band Relient K. It was released on June 27, 2005, as the second single from their 2004 fourth studio album Mmhmm. The music video entered TRL's top 10 in 2005, reaching as high as eight on the countdown. "Who I Am Hates Who I've Been" was released to radio on August 23, 2005. The song reached No. 58 on the US Billboard Hot 100, making it their most successful single to date. The song has been certified gold in the US for sales surpassing 500,000 units.

In 2019, Jesus Freak Hideout ranked "Who I Am Hates Who I've Been" at the third spot on their "Relient K's Top 20 Songs" list.

== Background and composition ==
Matt Thiessen wrote the song in Australia in light of a feud with Brian Pittman, the band's bassist. The lyrics reflect remorse for his behavior, as well as pleas for forgiveness. According to the sheet music published at Musicnotes.com, by Alfred Music Publishing, the track runs at 156 BPM and is in the key of E-flat major. Thiessen's range in the song spans from the notes B♭3 to B♭5.

An acoustic version, originally recorded for Apathetic EP, is included on the B-side, was included on the 2008 The Bird and the Bee Sides album.

== Music video ==
Time stops for a woman about to drop some books in the music video.

The music video for the song was released on September 29, 2005, and was directed by Jon Watts. The video shows a woman encountering various events being rewound and replayed, interposed with scenes of Relient K performing on an urban rooftop. Thiessen explained the concept of the video with MTV stating, "Yeah, basically, I'm walking down the street, and when I stop, the whole world around me stops, and when I start moving again, everything moves twice as fast. And there's a car crash, and I have to try and save the day [...] Jon was so excited to do this video that he made this really weird treatment for us. Instead of a normal treatment, he submitted a video camera and videotaped himself explaining how things are going to work. We were all kind of watching it going, 'O-kaaay ...'." The video debuted on MTV's Total Request Live at number ten on October 3, 2005, before reaching number eight on the countdown as its highest position.

The video starts off with a view of a room and a young woman. The camera then pans out to see her step outside. The first series of event that happens is as follows; a grocer tosses her a random green fruit and she catches it, then she stops walking and realizes that everything else around her stopped too. She starts walking back and forth while watching an old woman drop and rewind her library books. As the woman moves, her actions control everyone around her; an old man moving side to side with a TV, another young man on his cell phone and an Asian man crossing the street while preoccupied with reading a magazine.

The young woman makes a mistake and takes too many steps and watches as she causes the Asian man to be hit by a Plymouth Reliant car. Shocked, she tries retracing her steps and starts back at where the grocer tosses her the fruit and takes a few steps to the side and starts walking again. Since it is not the same path as the first time, the events have changed. Instead of her catching the fruit, the man on the cell phone is instead, hit by it and he drops his phone. As he bends down to pick it up he accidentally kicks it into the path of a bicycle that has to swerve to miss him but instead nearly hits the old man with the TV and causes him to drop it. This all results in the Asian man avoiding the hit and the video ends with her walking away.

== Track listing ==
CD single
No.	Title	Length
1.	"Who I Am Hates Who I've Been" (radio edit)	3:43
2.	"Who I Am Hates Who I've Been" (acoustic)	3:21

== Credits and personnel ==
Credits for "Who I Am Hates Who I've Been" adapted from album's liner notes.

Relient K

- Matt Thiessen – lead vocals, rhythm guitar, piano
- Matt Hoopes – lead guitar
- Dave Douglas – drums, backing vocals
- Brian Pittman – bass

Additional musicians

- John Warne – additional vocals

Production

- Mark Lee Townsend – producer, additional engineer
- Matt Thiessen – producer
- Joe Marlett – engineer
- Michael Modesto – second engineer
- Dave Salley – second engineer
- J.R. McNeely – mixing
- Matt "Mat5t" Weeks – assistant mixing
- Jim DeMain – mastering at Yes Master (Nashville, Tennessee)
- Ted Jensen – mastering at Sterling Sound (New York City, New York)

== Awards ==
In 2006, the song was nominated for a Dove Award for Rock Recorded Song of the Year at the 37th GMA Dove Awards.

== Charts ==
=== Weekly charts ===
Weekly chart performance for "Who I Am Hates Who I've Been"
Chart (2005–2006)	Peak position
Canada CHR/Pop Top 30 (Radio & Records)	16
US Billboard Hot 100	58
US Hot Christian Songs (Billboard)	32
US Pop Airplay (Billboard)	22
US Christian Rock Songs (Radio & Records)	2

=== Year-end charts ===
Year-end chart performance for "Who I Am Hates Who I've Been"
Chart (2005)	Peak position
US Christian CHR Songs (Radio & Records)	24
US Christian Rock Songs (Radio & Records)	20

== Certifications ==
Certifications and sales for "Who I Am Hates Who I've Been"
Region	Certification	Certified units/sales
United States (RIAA)	Gold	500,000^{^}
^{^} Shipments figures based on certification alone.

== Release history ==
Release dates and formats for "Who I Am Hates Who I've Been"
Region	Date	Format(s)	Label(s)	Ref(s).
United States	June 27, 2005	CD; digital download	Gotee; Capitol	
United States	August 23, 2005	Alternative radio	Gotee; Capitol	
United States	October 18, 2005	Contemporary hit radio	Capitol	
