= Ellington (band) =

Australian indie pop band

- Origin: Tannum Sands, Queensland, Australia
- Genres: Alternative rock; indie pop
- Years active: 2006–2010
- Labels: Starving Kids; Sony BMG Australia
- Past members: Jake Bosci; Michael Beatson; Sam Van Dyk; Joel Kowald; Greg Millner; Lloyd Budd; Anita Goldsworthy; Stevie West
- Website: myspace.com/ellingtonrock

Ellington were an Australian indie pop band from Tannum Sands, Queensland, formed in 2006. The band was fronted by mainstay singer-songwriter Jake Bosci (vocals and guitar) since he was in secondary school. He was joined by Michael Beatson (guitar) in 2007 and in 2008 by Lloyd Budd (bass). Ellington's eight-track extended play, The Joy We Keep In, was released in April 2007 via Starving Kids Records. The band travelled to the United States to record their next EP, More Like a Movie, Less Like Real Life (late 2008), with producer Matt Malpass. They returned to Australia and in 2009 the band toured in support of variously: Short Stack, Kenny Vasoli, MC Lars, Behind Crimson Eyes and Something With Numbers. The group disbanded in the following year.

== History ==
Ellington started in February 2006 as an acoustic trio in Tannum Sands, Queensland. Their early line-up was Michael Beatson on guitar, Jake Bosci on lead vocals and guitar and Sam Van Dyk on drums. They released an extended play, Where the City Meets the Sea, Your Heart Will Find Me, in that year but Van Dyk was replaced on drums by Joel Kowald soon after. Ellington's eight-track EP, The Joy We Keep In, was recorded by Beatson, Bosci and Kowald joined by Greg Millner on bass guitar and was produced by Joshua Burton, which was released in April 2007 via Starving Kids Records. Chris Wood of TheDwarf.com.au observed, "[it] made it hard for me to find any plausible reason for actually wanting to listen to them. Their brand of highly predictable love-inspired anthems and painstakingly sugar-pop lyrics is enough to make anyone question for a brief second what it is they actually enjoy about music." Upon their return to Queensland they relocated to Brisbane.

Ellington's next EP, More Like a Movie, Less Like Real Life, with six tracks was self-released, before the band signed a publishing deal with Sony BMG Australia. It was recorded in Atlanta, United States with producer Matt Malpass (Copeland, Lydia). It featured guest vocals from Matt Thiessen of Relient K, Jeff Turner of Say Anything and Leighton Antelman of Lydia. It was made available to order through the band's MySpace page and iTunes, however, a physical copy was not released in stores. Wood praised the EP's production values and reflected, "it's a little too perfect. They've been afflicted with the same production technique that has overseen other plastic-punk wannabe bad-arses." He continued, "They purport a positive life-affirming image, which does work to some extent. However, I don't find myself too enamored with the most important aspect of their current incarnation, which is their music. It's dated, and their cringe worthy lyrical sentiments is none too inspiring."

During 2009 they toured in support of Behind Crimson Eyes and Short Stack. FasterLouder's writer caught Ellington's support gig at the Manning Bar, Sydney, in May and felt, "The alternative/indie band has clearly formed a dedicated fanbase from their personable attitudes and fun, positive music... the Brisbane act were an interesting combination thrown into the mix." By July the line-up had expanded with Beatson, Bosci and Budd joined by Anita Goldsworthy on piano and Stevie West on drums. Bosci had written over 40 tracks for a proposed debut album, which were recorded as demos in 2009 with New York, producer Eric J (The Academy Is...). The band changed their publishing contract from Sony BMG to Sony/ATV Music Publishing. They returned to Brisbane from Atlanta in May 2010, where they had recorded seven new tracks with Malpass. In June they announced via Twitter that they were separating indefinitely, citing "creative differences". The tracks recorded with Malpass were not released.

In 2011 Jake Bosci announced a new music project, the Decoration, with his then-domestic partner, Rhian Thomas. Bosci and Thomas turned to Malpass to record an EP which was scheduled for release in early 2012. Bosci and Thomas married in July 2013. In December 2015 Bosci, who had relocated to Los Angeles, released a solo EP, Wild Love, with its lead single, "Heartbreak". Beatson released a solo recording under the alias, A Direst Desire.

== Discography ==
=== Extended plays ===
- The Joy We Keep In (April 2007)
- More Like a Movie, Less Like Real Life (late 2008)
