= Employee of the Month EP =

Employee Of The Month EP

EP by Relient K
- Released: 2002
- Recorded: 2002
- Genre: Christian pop punk, pop punk
- Length: 21:04
- Label: Gotee
- Producer: Mark Lee Townsend

Relient K chronology
The Anatomy of the Tongue in Cheek (2001)	Employee Of The Month EP (2002)	Two Lefts Don't Make a Right...but Three Do (2003)

Professional ratings
Review scores
Source	Rating
Jesus Freak Hideout	4/5 stars

Employee of the Month EP is the third EP released by Relient K. Tracks 1 and 2 are from the band's subsequent third album, Two Lefts Don't Make a Right...but Three Do. Track 6 is from the band's second album, The Anatomy of the Tongue in Cheek.

The packaging depicts each member of Relient K as an employee of the month. Matt Thiessen, Matt Hoopes, Dave Douglas and Brian Pittman for May, June, July and August accordingly. The album cover shows Aaron Marrs, a friend of the band, as the Employee of the Month for September.

Marrs was a part of the design and/or layout of many of the album covers for the band, including this EP's cover and the cover of Two Lefts Don't Make a Right...but Three Do. He died in January 2005, and therefore, Relient K dedicated the Apathetic EP to him.

== Track listing ==
All songs written by Matt Thiessen

1. "Trademark" – 4:00
2. "In Love With the 80s (Pink Tux to the Prom)" – 3:09
3. "Wit's All Been Done Before" – 3:30
4. "A Penny Loafer Saved, A Penny Loafer Earned" – 2:25
5. "For the Band" – 4:23
6. "Failure to Excommunicate" – 3:37

== Credits ==
- Matt Thiessen – lead vocals, guitar, piano
- Matt Hoopes – guitar, backing vocals
- Brian Pittman – bass guitar
- Dave Douglas – drums, backing vocals
