= The Vinyl Countdown =

EP by Relient K
- Released: August 1, 2003
- Recorded: 2003
- Genre: Christian rock
- Length: 7:28
- Label: Mono Vs Stereo
- Producer: Mark Lee Townsend; Matthew Thiessen

Relient K chronology
Two Lefts Don't Make a Right...but Three Do (2003)	The Vinyl Countdown (2003)	Deck the Halls, Bruise Your Hand (2003)

The Vinyl Countdown is the fourth EP by Christian rock band Relient K, released on August 1, 2003, via Mono vs Stereo. It was released exclusively on a clear red 7" vinyl record.

== Background ==
In July 2003, Relient K announced that they would be releasing a limited edition vinyl EP titled The Vinyl Countdown, with only 1,500 copies in printing. The EP included two versions of the song, "Five Iron Frenzy Is Either Dead or Dying." The 7" was dedicated to super fan Jesse Alkire, who inspired the title track. The 7" was dedicated to super fan Jesse Alkire (with a note in the bottom corner of the vinyl sleeve reading "Here's to Jesse Alkire").

The dual songs entitled "Five Iron Frenzy Is Either Dead or Dying" were made to pay tribute to the Christian ska band of the same name, as they had broken up earlier in the year. The songs are filled with humor similar to what the band was known for in their lyrical style.

On November 13, 2015, the EP was re-released as a two part 7" vinyl, via Gotee Records.

== Track listing ==
All songs written by Matt Thiessen.

Side A

1. "The Vinyl Countdown" – 2:35
2. "Five Iron Frenzy Is Either Dead or Dying" – 0:28

Side B

1. "We're Nothing Without You" – 3:47
2. "Five Iron Frenzy Is Either Dead or Dying (Wannabe Ska Version)" – 0:38

== Personnel ==
Credits adapted from album's liner notes.

Relient K

- Matt Thiessen – lead vocals, guitar, piano
- Matt Hoopes – guitar, backing vocals
- Brian Pittman – bass
- Dave Douglas – drums, backing vocals (drums on "We're Nothing Without You only)

Additional musicians

- Brett Schoneman (of Philmore) – drums (all but "We're Nothing Without You")

Production

- Mark Lee Townsend – producer, mixing
- Matt Thiessen – co-producer
- Randy LeRoy – mastering
- Aaron Marrs – artwork design, layout

Notes

- The credits in the booklet of The Bird and the Bee Sides showed that Philmore drummer and former Relient K fill in drummer, Brett Schoneman, played drums on every song of this EP except "We're Nothing Without You".
