= Derek Kern =

American singer

Derek Kern is a musician and vocalist. He is a member of The Evan Anthem, and also recorded with Relient K on their Apathetic EP.

In addition to providing vocals, Kern also plays the guitar and keyboards.
