= The Truth (Relient K song) =

Single by Relient K

from the EP Apathetic EP
- Released: November 14, 2005
- Recorded: 2005
- Studio: S S Studio (Spring Hill, Tennessee)
- Genre: Christian rock; pop punk
- Length: 3:18
- Label: Capitol; Gotee
- Songwriter: Matthew Thiessen
- Producer: Mark Lee Townsend

Relient K singles chronology
"Who I Am Hates Who I've Been" (2005)	"The Truth" (2005)	"High of 75" (2006)

"The Truth" is a song by American Christian rock band Relient K. It was released as the lead and only single from their fifth EP Apathetic. It was released for Christian radio on November 14, 2005.

== Background ==
The song was inspired from the 2005 fantasy film The Chronicles of Narnia: The Lion, the Witch and the Wardrobe. Matthew Thiessen said that "The Truth" was originally about how everyone wouldn't believe the character of Lucy, although she'd never lied to them before, but he then changed it to fit a relationship with God.

== Composition ==
"The Truth" was written by Matthew Thiessen and produced by Mark Lee Townsend. It was recorded at S S Studio in Spring Hill, Tennessee, and mastered at Final Stage Mastering in Nashville by Randy Leroy. Lyrically, the song speaks about dealing with the inability at times to believe "The truth" and "that we are intellectually inept." It also explores having faith in God and strengthening a relationship with him.

== Personnel ==
Credits for "The Truth" adapted from album's liner notes.

Relient K

- Matthew Thiessen – lead vocals
- Matt Hoopes – guitars, backing vocals
- Jon Schneck – guitars, backing vocals
- John Warne – bass guitar, backing vocals
- Dave Douglas – drums, backing vocals

Production

- Mark Lee Townsend – producer, recording
- Randy Leroy – mastering at Final Stage Mastering (Nashville, TN)
- JR McNeely – mixing
- Matt Weeks – mixing assistant

== Charts ==
=== Weekly charts ===
Weekly chart performance for "The Truth"
Chart (2006)	Peak position
UK Christian Songs (Cross Rhythms)	2
US Christian Rock Songs (Billboard)	9

=== Year-end charts ===
2005 year-end chart performance for "The Truth"
Chart (2005)	Peak position
US Christian Rock Songs (Radio & Records)	11

2006 year-end chart performance for "The Truth"
Chart (2006)	Peak position
UK Christian Songs (Cross Rhythms)	79

== Release history ==
Release history for "The Truth"
Region	Date	Format	Label	Ref.
United States	November 14, 2005	Christian radio	Gotee	
