= Tuscarawas Valley High School =

Tuscarawas Valley
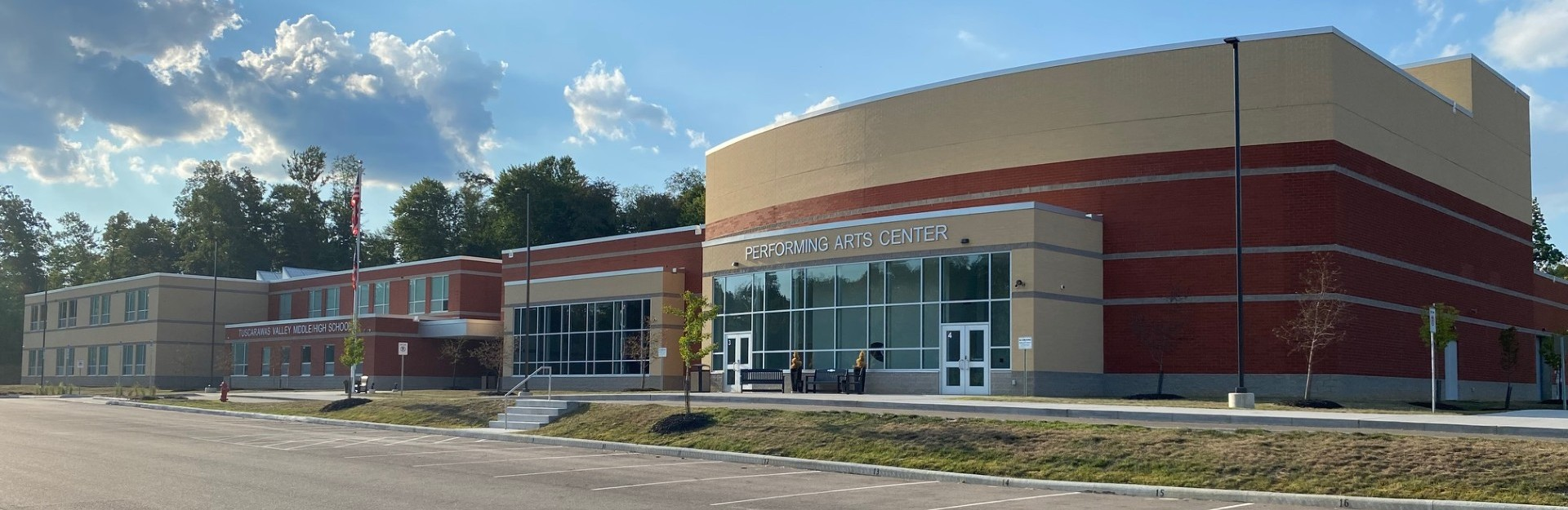

Location
- 2637 Tuscarawas Valley Road NE; Zoarville, Ohio 44656; United States

Information
- Type: Public
- Established: 1942
- Grades: 7-12
- Enrollment: 543 (2023-2024)
- Colors: White, red, and black
- Nickname: Trojans
- Website: www.tvtrojans.org/TVMHS.aspx

Tuscarawas Valley High School, also known as simply Tusky Valley, is a public high school in Zoarville, Ohio. It is the only high school in the Tuscarawas Valley Local Schools district. Athletic teams compete as the Trojans.

On November 14, 2023, six people were killed and twenty were injured in a crash on Interstate 70 after a semi-trailer truck rear ended a charter bus carrying members of the Tuscarawas Valley High School band.

== Sports ==
Tusky Valley offers ten sports at the varsity level: football, cross country, volleyball, soccer, golf, wrestling, basketball, track, baseball, and softball.

== Notable people ==
- Matthew Thiessen, lead singer/guitarist/song-writer of rock band Relient K.
