= The Best Thing (Relient K song) =

Single by Relient K

from the album Five Score and Seven Years Ago
- Released: April 10, 2007
- Recorded: 2006
- Genre: Pop punk; Christian rock
- Length: 3:28
- Label: Capitol; Gotee
- Songwriter: Matt Thiessen
- Producer: Howard Benson

Relient K singles chronology
"Forgiven" (2006)	"The Best Thing" (2007)	"I Need You" (2007)

"The Best Thing" is a song by American rock band Relient K. It was released as the third single from their fifth studio album, Five Score and Seven Years Ago. The song was released to Top 40 and Hot AC stations on April 10, 2007, and released to Christian Hit Radio on February 1, 2008.

The song was included on the WOW Hits 2009 compilation album. It was also used in promotional spots tapped by ABC.

== Background ==
Matt Thiessen, the lead singer, has described the song as, "The anti-Daniel Powter 'Bad Day' song, it's straight up positive." Musically, it "veers giddily between majestic piano flourishes and punked-out bliss delivered at breakneck speed." The group performed the song on The Tonight Show with Jay Leno on April 12, 2007.

== Chart performance ==
The song peaked at number 29 on the US Hot Christian Songs chart. It also peaked at number 48 on the US CHR/Pop Top 50 chart. It was the 18th most-played song of 2008 on U.S. Contemporary Christian music radio stations according to R&R magazine's Christian CHR chart.

== Music video ==
The music video for "The Best Thing" was directed by Barnaby Roper and shot in April 2007. Released on June 6, 2007, it was revealed that the video's main theme is a girl taking pictures, which turns out to be of the band performing. The pictures that pop up show all the band members playing. The pictures piece together throughout the video, sometimes showing separate members, and sometimes showing multiple views of the same member. It is somewhat made up of animation, which is something Matt Thiessen had wanted in one of their videos.

== Track listing ==
US promo CD

1. The Best Thing - 3:29

== Charts ==
=== Weekly charts ===
Weekly chart performance for "The Best Thing"
Chart (2007–2008)	Peak position
US Hot Christian Songs (Billboard)	29
US CHR/Pop Top 50 (Radio & Records)	48

=== Year-end charts ===
Year-end chart performance for "The Best Thing"
Chart (2008)	Peak position
US Christian CHR Songs (Radio & Records)	18

== Release history ==
Release dates for "The Best Thing"
Region	Date	Format	Label	Ref.
United States	April 10, 2007	Contemporary hit radio	Capitol; Gotee	
United States	February 1, 2008	Christian radio	Capitol; Gotee	
