= Apathetic EP =

EP by Relient K
- Released: November 8, 2005
- Studios: S-S-Studio, Spring Hill, Tennessee
- Genres: Christian rock; acoustic rock; pop punk
- Length: 23:34
- Labels: Gotee; Capitol
- Producers: Mark Lee Townsend; Matt Thiessen

Relient K chronology
Mmhmm (2004)	Apathetic EP (2005)	Five Score and Seven Years Ago (2007)

Singles from Apathetic
- 1. "The Truth" Released: November 14, 2005

Apathetic EP is the fifth EP released by Relient K. It was released on November 8, 2005, via Capitol and Gotee Records. The EP reached no. 94 on the Billboard 200. The EP was streamed online, prior to its official release.

== Background and release ==
On June 2, 2005, the group posted a song online titled, "Apathetic Way to Be". The song was revealed to be a part of an EP titled, Apathetic, announced in October 2005, with a release date for November 8, 2005. The EP features eight tracks, including acoustic versions of "Be My Escape", "Who I Am Hates Who I've Been", "Which to Bury, Us or the Hatchet" and "Over Thinking", and three new songs. The song "In Like a Lion (Always Winter)" was originally intended to be included on the album Music Inspired by The Chronicles of Narnia: The Lion, the Witch, and the Wardrobe but was later excluded. "The Truth" was serviced to Christian radio on November 14, 2005, as the EP's lead and only single.

According to singer Matt Thiessen, the EP was suggested by Capitol Records, who wanted the band to release something before the end of the year. Thiessen liked the idea, explaining, "I'm really glad we did that... We haven't done a lot of acoustic stuff as far as covering our own songs and recording that, so we're happy about that." He also stated the reasoning behind recording four acoustic tracks and putting them on the EP, "The songs are already written, so it's not like you have to write new songs; and we've been doing a lot of radio shows and playing on TRL where they always want you to do an acoustic version of something. So we were just like 'you know, these sound kind of fun' and thought it would be cool to just record them." This marks the first release with guitarist Jon Schneck, who joined the band earlier in the year. Schneck performed guitar, banjo, bells and vocals on the EP, giving the band more instrumental depth and a more distinctive sound.

== Critical reception ==
Professional ratings
Review scores
Source	Rating
AllMusic	3/5 stars
Cross Rhythms	7/10 stars
Jesus Freak Hideout	4.5/5 stars
Melodic	2/5 stars
PunkNews.org	3/5 stars

The EP received generally positive reviews from music critics. Johnny Loftus of AllMusic praised the acoustic version of "Be My Escape", feeling that it is "even better" than the studio version. However, he was critical on "The Truth", calling it "pretty generic," but highlighted "Apathetic Way to Be" as the EP's standout track. Daniel Hames of Cross Rhythms stated, "This is a pleasant listen, and shows something of the band's progression musically and lyrically." Josh Taylor of Jesus Freak Hideout wrote, "they prove they are capable of balancing depth with catchy hooks and happy tunes with acoustic swagger." Kaj Roth of Melodic gave a negative review for the EP, stating, "'The Truth' is an ok catchy punk pop song but no knockout [...] The remaining 2 are ballads - 'In Like a Lion (Always Winter)' is a fine slow power pop song in the Something Corporate vein which feels like it has it's [sic] place at the end of the EP. The EP ends with the piano piece 'The Thief' which is nice but not as good the one before, it's short and misses a real chorus." However, he praised "Apathetic Way to Be" as the EP's highlight, due to its "real singalong chorus."

== Track listing ==
All tracks are written by Matt Thiessen.

No.	Title	Length
1.	"The Truth"	3:18
2.	"Apathetic Way to Be"	3:21
3.	"Be My Escape" (Acoustic)	4:02
4.	"Which to Bury, Us or the Hatchet?" (Acoustic)	2:44
5.	"Over Thinking" (Acoustic)	4:09
6.	"In Like a Lion (Always Winter)"	3:43
7.	"The Thief"	2:22

- "The Thief" went on to become "There was no Thief" on their 2008 EP, The Bird and the Bee Sides.

== Credits and personnel ==
Credits adapted from album's liner notes.

Relient K

- Matt Thiessen – lead vocals, guitar, piano, organ, bells
- Matt Hoopes – guitar, backing vocals
- Dave Douglas – drums, backing vocals
- John Warne – bass, backing vocals
- Jon Schneck – guitar, banjo, mandolin, backing vocals

Additional personnel

- Mark Lee Townsend – acoustic guitar and twelve string guitar on "In Like a Lion (Always Winter)"
- Davy Baysinger – additional vocals on "The Truth"
- Pete Prevost – additional vocals on "The Truth"
- Derek Kern – additional vocals on "The Truth"
- J.R. McNeely – audio mixing

== Charts ==
Chart performance for Apathetic
Chart (2005)	Peak position
US Billboard 200	94
US Top Christian Albums (Billboard)	5
