= Mmhmm =

Studio album by Relient K
- Released: November 2, 2004
- Studios: Dark Horse Recording (Franklin, Tennessee)
- Genres: Pop-punk; Christian rock; alternative rock
- Length: 50:22
- Labels: Gotee; Capitol
- Producers: Mark Lee Townsend; Matt Thiessen

Relient K chronology
Deck the Halls, Bruise Your Hand (2003)	Mmhmm (2004)	Apathetic EP (2005)

Singles from Mmhmm
- 1. "Be My Escape" Released: November 2, 2004; 2. "Who I Am Hates Who I've Been" Released: June 27, 2005; 3. "High of 75" Released: June 2, 2006

Mmhmm is the fourth full-length studio album by American rock band Relient K, released on November 2, 2004, by Gotee and Capitol Records. This album includes their breakthrough singles "Be My Escape" and "Who I Am Hates Who I've Been" and also earned the group a Canadian Juno Award nomination for Contemporary Christian/Gospel Album of the Year in 2006. It was certified Gold in 2005 by the RIAA for sales in excess of 500,000 units in the United States and has sold over 800,000 copies in the US. It won the 2006 Dove Award for Rock Album of the Year at the 37th GMA Dove Awards. The album was produced by Mark Lee Townsend and Matt Thiessen and was recorded at Dark Horse Recording in Franklin, Tennessee.

== Background and recording ==
Relient K headed to Dark Horse Recording in Franklin, Tennessee, to record their fourth studio album, Mmhmm. The group worked with producer Mark Lee Townsend, who previously produced their previous three albums, Relient K (2000), The Anatomy of the Tongue in Cheek (2001) and Two Lefts Don't Make a Right...but Three Do (2003). Singer Matt Thiessen had most of the album written from January to April 2004. The album was mixed by J.R. McNeely and Tom Lord-Alge. According to Thiessen, the group had enough money to work with Lord-Alge to mix three songs, where they picked songs they thought could be singles. Lord-Alge mixed the songs "Be My Escape", "High of 75" and "My Girl's Ex-Boyfriend", while McNeely mixed the remaining songs from the album.

In June 2004, bassist Brian Pittman left the band, citing that he wanted to start a landscaping company. Pittman maintained credits for his contribution on the album, as he played on most of the record. John Warne would serve as his replacement, who also provided additional vocals on "More Than Useless" and "Who I Am Hates Who I've Been". Upon the release for Mmhmm, the group signed with Capitol Records on October 22. They signed with the label in hopes of reaching more of a mainstream audience.

== Composition ==
Lyrically, the group decided to tone down on some of the silly and humorous lyrics, in favor of more thoughtful lyricism. With the decision of doing so, the band also hoped that their fans were "willing to grow up a bit with us." Many of the songs were written about Thiessen's past mistakes in life, reflection and finding hope, a theme he said "should be a part of everyone's life." "The Only Thing Worse Than Beating a Dead Horse Is Betting on One", "My Girl's Ex Boyfriend", "Maintain Consciousness", and "This Week The Trend" are songs which maintain the humorous writing that the band had been doing in the past, however, other songs like "I So Hate Consequences" and "When I Go Down" explicitly details Thiessen's faith and Christianity, without coming across as "preachy." Some songs are about relationships, which include "The One I'm Waiting For" and "My Girl's Ex-Boyfriend", and "Which To Bury; Us or the Hatchet?".

Musically, pop-punk remains as a core component in the band's sound on songs such as "High Of 75", "The Only Thing Worse Than Beating a Dead Horse Is Betting on One" and "More Than Useless". The group also decided to experiment with other sounds, incorporating piano and some pop music. According to guitarist Matt Hoopes, the goal was to make "a good rock record" and have something that "has its own character." Thiessen said the sound was not much of a departure from their previous works and responded to those criticizing the group who felt like they did, stating, "I didn't know we were doing that. But I really like the mellow stuff and obviously like the energy and the rock 'n' roll." Drummer Dave Douglas felt like there was a "natural progression" between the releases of each albums that they've had and "the direction keeps shifting for the better."

== Release ==
The album was the band's first on Capitol Records; and bassist Brian Pittman's last album with the band. In addition to being released on Capitol and Gotee, Mmhmm was re-released on vinyl on Mono Vs Stereo, which includes a song originally from the Apathetic EP, called "Apathetic Way to Be". The singles "Be My Escape" and "Who I Am Hates Who I've Been", boosted Relient K's mainstream popularity. "Be My Escape" was released on November 2, 2004 as the lead single, the same day as the album. The song peaked at number 82 on the Billboard Hot 100, their first entry on the chart and was certified Gold by the Recording Industry Association of America. The album's second single, "Who I Am Hates Who I've Been" was released on June 27, 2005. The song reached number 58 on the Billboard Hot 100 and was certified Gold by the RIAA. The song was released to radio on August 23. Serviced to Christian radio on June 2, 2006, as the album's third and final single, "High of 75", the song peaked at number 17 on the US Hot Christian Songs chart.

On December 9, 2014, the album was reissued for the tenth anniversary of the album's release. The reissue, Mmhmm10 was available as a deluxe edition CD and a digital download, while a vinyl edition of the original album, that also included a copy of the deluxe CD, was also released. The band toured around the United States for the anniversary. For the twentieth anniversary of Mmhmm, the album was re-pressed on vinyl.

== Promotion ==
In February 2005, Relient K toured the Southern US states with Mae and Name Taken. They appeared at The Bamboozle festival in April 2005. In May and June 2005, the group supported Good Charlotte and Simple Plan on their co-headlining US tour. Between mid June and mid August, the group went on the 2005 edition of Warped Tour. In October and November 2005, they embarked on a headlining US tour, with support from MxPx, Rufio and Over It. Between February and April 2006, the group went on The Matt Hoopes Birthday Tour, with support from the Rocket Summer and Maxeen. Following this, they appeared at The Bamboozle festival.

== Reception ==
Professional ratings
Review scores
Source	Rating
AbsolutePunk	(90%)
AllMusic	3.5/5 stars
Cross Rhythms	9/10 squares
IGN	7.8/10
Jesus Freak Hideout	4.5/5 stars
Melodic	3.5/5 stars
PopMatters	7/10 stars
Punknews.org	2.5/5 stars
Stylus Magazine	C+
Yahoo! Music	Favorable

Mmhmm received generally positive reviews from music critics. John D. Luerssen of AllMusic stated, "After moving away from their patented pop/punk approach on 2003's Two Lefts Don't Make a Right...But Three Do, spiritual rockers Relient K revert back to their proven formula of yore on MMHMM [...] At times the lads in Relient K come off a bit too mainstream for their own good, but you've got to give them thanks for not going straight for the jugular the way so many other Christian rockers might." Steve Best of Cross Rhythms remarked, "the power pop punks have upped the ante with a mixture of tongue-in-cheek fun ('My Girl's ex-Boyfriend') and reflection ('Who I Am Hates Who I've Been') which never dips in quality and credibility. Helmed by the ridiculously talented and tasteful Mark Lee Townsend, this set will have the likes of Busted and McFly crying into their Sunny D's." IGN wrote that the album "manages to be spiritual without being heavy-handed, varied without sounding spastic, and clean-sounding without coming off as manufactured."

Josh Taylor of Jesus Freak Hideout described the album as their "most aggressive work to date." He noted, "There is growth, but it's in much more subtle ways than on past releases. This can most likely be attributed to the fact that Relient K had almost perfected their art with Two Lefts..., and Mmhmm simply builds on what was already a very good thing, while tactfully experimenting with different sounds." Kenneth Yu of PopMatters said the album "has successfully evoked those memories of angst ridden teen-hood past, my search for identity and the coming to terms with my faith facilitated by bands-of-yore."

Writing for Stylus Magazine, Justin Cober-Lake gave the album a mixed review, stating, "Right now, the band isn't taking the chances or reaching far to enough to stay interesting for an album-length effort, but they do have their moments. Their lyrics are their strength; they've been able to bring out the seriousness of their concerns without losing the joy or goofiness. If the music catches up, they'll be a reliable act." Brian Shultz of PunkNews also gave a mixed review for the album, "For the band themselves it seems like a landmark effort. They've managed to slowly mature over the years, lyrically anyway, but it especially shows this time around. The sugary choruses here sound pretty similar, and it's nothing new by a longshot, but Mmhmm is a moderately enjoyable effort, as opposed to how irritating some of their contemporaries can be."

== Commercial performance ==
Mmhmm debuted on the Billboard 200 at number 15 and sold 51,473 copies in its first week. The album also topped the Christian Albums chart for five weeks. By August 2005, the album sold 300,000 copies in the United States. In 2005, the album was certified Gold by the RIAA for sales in excess of 500,000 units in the United States. It has sold over 800,000 copies in the United States.

== Awards and nominations ==
The album earned the group a Canadian Juno Award nomination for Contemporary Christian/Gospel Album of the Year in 2006. In 2006, the album won a Dove Award for Rock Album of the Year at the 37th GMA Dove Awards. It was also nominated for Recorded Music Packaging of the Year. The songs "Be My Escape" and "Who I Am Hates Who I've Been" received nominations as well.

== Track listing ==
All tracks are written by Matt Thiessen.

Standard edition
No.	Title	Length
0.	"MMHMM" (pregap track)	-0:17
1.	"The One I'm Waiting For"	3:02
2.	"Be My Escape"	4:00
3.	"High of 75"	2:27
4.	"I So Hate Consequences"	4:01
5.	"The Only Thing Worse Than Beating a Dead Horse Is Betting on One"	1:13
6.	"My Girl's Ex-Boyfriend"	2:28
7.	"More Than Useless"	3:50
8.	"Which to Bury, Us or the Hatchet?"	4:11
9.	"Let It All Out"	4:21
10.	"Who I Am Hates Who I've Been"	3:52
11.	"Maintain Consciousness"	2:52
12.	"This Week the Trend"	2:59
13.	"Life After Death & Taxes (Failure II)"	4:23
14.	"When I Go Down"	6:42
Total length:		50:21

Mmhmm10
No.	Title	Writer(s)	Length
10.	"Apathetic Way To Be"		3:21
11.	"Who I Am Hates Who I've Been"		3:52
12.	"Maintain Consciousness"		2:52
13.	"This Week the Trend"		2:59
14.	"Life After Death & Taxes (Failure II)"		4:23
15.	"When I Go Down"		6:42
16.	"Mmhmm"		0:17
17.	"The Truth"		3:17
18.	"Be My Escape" (acoustic)		4:03
19.	"I So Hate Consequences" (acoustic)		4:40
20.	"Which to Bury, Us or the Hatchet?" (acoustic)		2:44
21.	"Who I Am Hates Who I've Been" (acoustic)		3:21
22.	"The Thief"		2:22
23.	"Manic Monday" (The Bangles cover)	Prince	2:46
Total length:			74:26

== Personnel ==
Credits adapted from album's liner notes.

Relient K

- Matt Thiessen – lead vocals, acoustic piano, keyboards, rhythm guitar,
- Matt Hoopes – backing vocals, lead guitar
- Brian Pittman – bass
- Dave Douglas – drums, percussion, backing vocals, additional vocals (4,7,13),

Additional personnel

- Rob Roy Fingerhead – banjo, additional guitars, percussion
- Tony Lucido – bass
- David Henry – cello
- Chris Carmichael – viola, violin
- David Bunton – additional vocals (4, 8, 13)
- Kevin Kiehn – additional vocals (4)
- John Warne – additional vocals (7, 10)
- John Davis – additional vocals (9, 14)

Production

- Joey Elwood – executive producer
- Toby McKeehan – executive producer
- Mark Lee Townsend – producer, additional engineer
- Matt Thiessen – producer
- Joe Marlett – engineer
- Michael Modesto – second engineer
- Dave Salley – second engineer
- J.R. McNeely – mixing (0, 1, 4, 5, 7–14)
- Tom Lord-Alge – mixing (2, 3, 6)
- Matt "Mat5t" Weeks – mix assistant (0, 1, 4, 5, 7–14)
- Jim DeMain – mastering at Yes Master (Nashville, Tennessee)
- Ted Jensen – mastering at Sterling Sound (New York City, New York)
- Grant Harrison – A&R
- Eddy Boer – creative direction
- Greg Leppert – creative direction, design, illustration
- Alabaster Arts – management

== Charts ==
=== Weekly charts ===
Weekly chart performance for Mmhmm
Chart (2004)	Peak position
US Billboard 200	15
US Top Christian Albums (Billboard)	1

=== Year-end charts ===
2005 year-end chart performance for Mmhmm
Chart (2005)	Position
US Billboard 200	159
US Christian Albums (Billboard)	4

2006 year-end chart performance for Mmhmm
Chart (2006)	Position
US Christian Albums (Billboard)	14

== Certifications ==
Region	Certification	Certified units/sales
United States (RIAA)	Gold	500,000^{^}
^{^} Shipments figures based on certification alone.
