= John Warne =

American musician (born 1979)

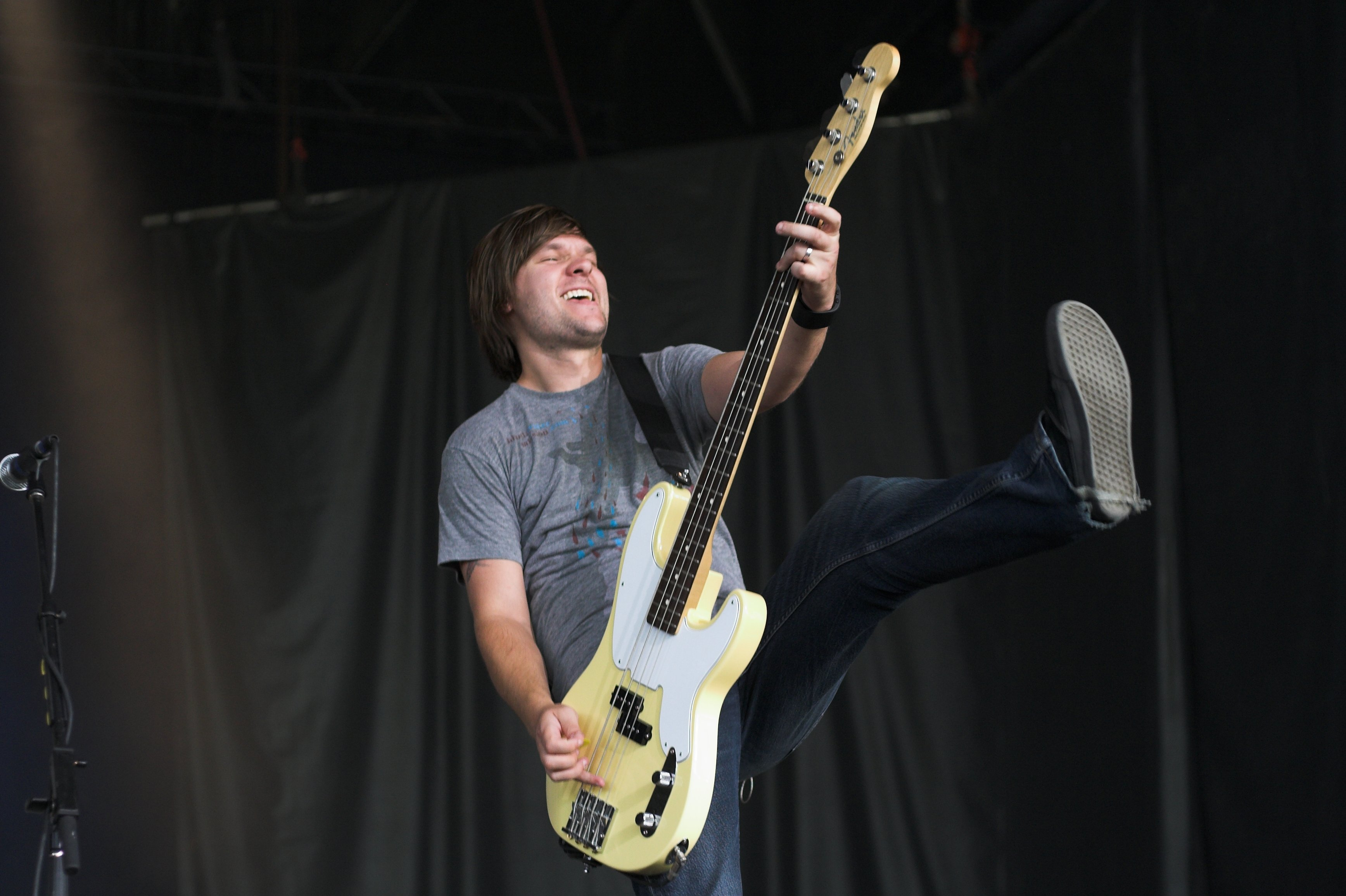
- Warne performing with Relient K in 2009

Background information
- Born: John Warne; June 27, 1979 (age 47)
- Origin: U.S.
- Genres: Christian alternative rock, pop punk
- Occupation: Musician
- Instruments: Bass guitar, guitar, vocals
- Years active: 1996–present
- Formerly of: Relient K, Ace Troubleshooter, Guerilla Rodeo

John Warne is an American musician who has been active since 1996. He is best known for being the bassist for the Christian rock band Relient K as well as being a founding member of the Christian punk band Ace Troubleshooter. His hometown is Minneapolis, Minnesota, and he now lives in Golden, Colorado.

== Bands ==
=== Relient K ===
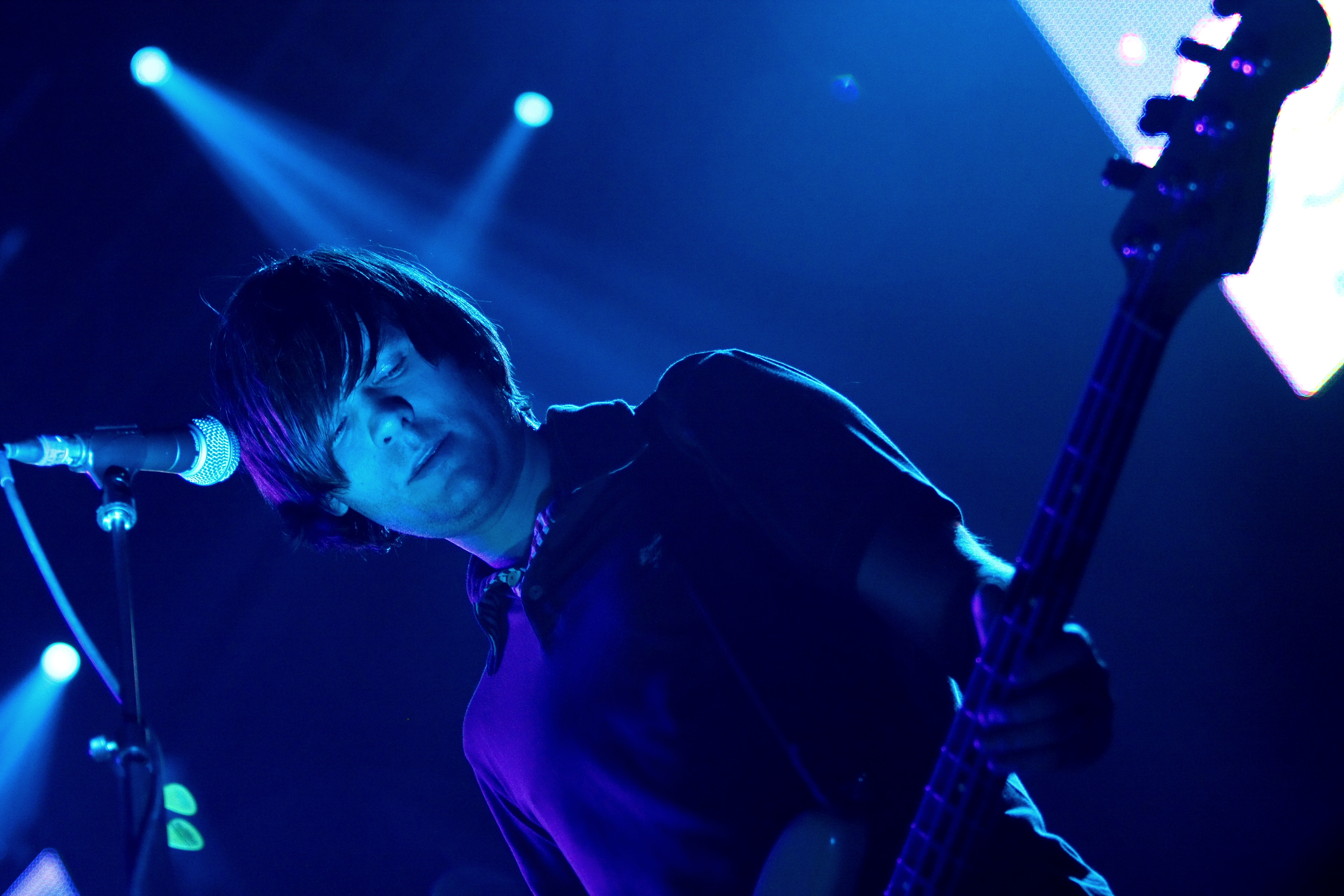
Warne performing with Relient K in 2008

Warne originally started filling in as a bassist for Relient K in September 2004, after Brian Pittman left the band less than a month earlier. Warne joined Relient K as the full-time bassist and backing vocalist in February 2005. He contributed to four Relient K projects, and four full-length albums, Five Score and Seven Years Ago, Forget and Not Slow Down, Is for Karaoke, and Collapsible Lung. He also provided back-up vocals for two songs on Relient K's 2004 album Mmhmm. Warne also animated the band's flash cartoon, Woodland Forest.

=== Ace Troubleshooter ===
Warne is a founding member of the now-defunct Christian punk band Ace Troubleshooter, in which he played guitar and sang lead vocals. The band was active from 1996 to 2004, recording five full-length albums, the first two independently released and the last three released under the record label Tooth & Nail Records or its affiliate BEC Recordings.

=== Guerilla Rodeo ===
In 2004, Warne participated in the short-lived band Guerilla Rodeo, playing bass. The band's only record was a three-track EP.

== Discography ==
With Ace Troubleshooter

- Back in the Shootin' Match (1996) – lead vocals and guitar
- Don't Stop a Rockin' (1999) – lead vocals and guitar
- Ace Troubleshooter (album) (2000) – lead vocals and guitar
- The Madness of the Crowds (2002) – lead vocals and guitar
- It's Never Enough (2004) – lead vocals and guitar

With Guerilla Rodeo

- Ride, Rope and Destroy (2004) – bass guitar and backing vocals

With Relient K

- Mmhmm (2004) – guest vocals on "More Than Useless" and "Who I Am Hates Who I've Been"
- Apathetic EP (2005) – bass guitar and backing vocals
- Five Score and Seven Years Ago (2007) – bass guitar and backing vocals
- The Bird and the Bee Sides (2008) – bass guitar and backing vocals, wrote and sang "The Last, the Lost, the Least"
- Forget and Not Slow Down (2009) – bass guitar and backing vocals
- Is for Karaoke (2011) – bass guitar and backing vocals
- Collapsible Lung (2013) – bass guitar and backing vocals
