= Brian Pittman =

American bassist (born 1980)

- Also known as: Brian
- Born: Brian Lee Pittman; October 21, 1980 (age 46)
- Origin: Canton, Ohio, U.S.
- Genres: Christian alternative rock, pop punk, metalcore
- Occupation: Musician
- Instrument: Bass
- Years active: 1998–present
- Formerly of: Inhale Exhale, Relient K
- Website: inhaleexhalerock.com

Brian Lee Pittman (born October 21, 1980) is an American musician most notable as the former bassist for the Christian rock band Relient K, of which he was a founding member. He has also played bass for the Christian metal band Inhale Exhale.

== Career ==
=== Relient K ===
Pittman played bass for Relient K from the band's beginning in 1998 until Bleach's farewell show on August 29, 2004. He contributed to 13 Relient K projects, including five full-length albums, four EPs, a two-track single, and two Christmas albums. The last album he contributed to was Mmhmm (the band's fourth album), along with longtime bandmates Matt Thiessen, Matt Hoopes, and Dave Douglas.

=== Inhale Exhale ===
Shortly after leaving Relient K, Pittman joined the band Inhale Exhale. They released their first album on November 21, 2006, entitled The Lost. The Sick. The Sacred.

== Personal life ==
Pittman married on August 30, 2008, and currently resides in Canal Fulton, Ohio.

Pittman owns a landscaping company called Aura Concrete & Landscaping.

== Discography ==
Pittman has been on a combined fourteen releases with Relient K and Inhale Exhale. He has also appeared in three music videos for Relient K, and two videos with Inhale Exhale. He appears in Relient K's second Christmas album as bass on tracks 5, 6, 7, 8, 11, 12, 13, 14, and 16.

=== With Relient K ===
- All Work and No Play (1998)
- 2000 A.D.D. (2000)
- Relient K (album) (2000)
- "My Girlfriend" music video (2000)
- The Creepy EP (2001)
- The Anatomy of the Tongue in Cheek (2001)
- "Pressing On" music video (2001)
- "The Pirates Who Don't Do Anything" (2002)
- Employee of the Month EP (2002)
- Two Lefts Don't Make a Right...but Three Do (2003)
- "Chap Stick, Chapped Lips, and Things Like Chemistry" music video (2003)
- The Vinyl Countdown (2003)
- Deck the Halls, Bruise Your Hand (2003)
- Mmhmm (2004)
- Let It Snow Baby... Let It Reindeer (2007) (on tracks recorded in 2003 or earlier)
- The Bird and the Bee Sides (2008) (on tracks recorded in 2004 or earlier)

=== With Inhale Exhale ===
- The Lost. The Sick. The Sacred. (2006)
- "Redemption" music video (2006)
- "A Call to the Faithful" music video (2007)

== See also ==
- Inhale Exhale
- Relient K
