= Matt Thiessen =

Canadian-American musician (born 1980)

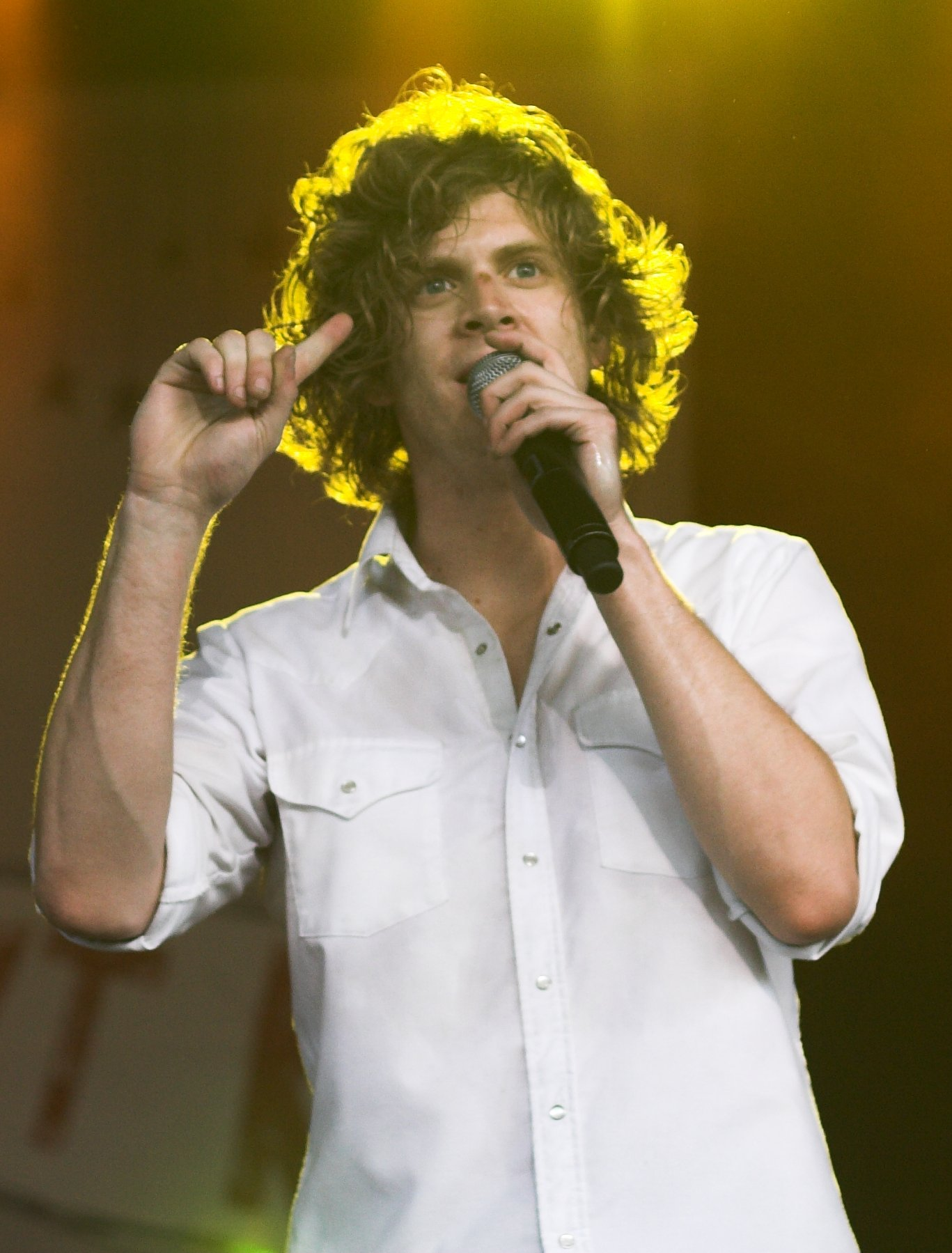
- Thiessen performing at Wonder Jam 2009

Background information
- Born: Matthew Arnold Thiessen; August 12, 1980 (age 46); St. Catharines, Ontario, Canada
- Origin: Canton, Ohio, U.S.
- Genres: Christian rock; alternative rock; pop punk; folk music; indie pop; guitar pop
- Occupations: Singer; musician; songwriter
- Instruments: Vocals; piano; guitar
- Years active: 1998–present
- Member of: Relient K

Matthew Arnold Thiessen (born August 12, 1980) is a Canadian-born American musician known for being the lead vocalist, pianist, guitarist, and primary songwriter for the rock band Relient K. With Relient K, he has released eight full-length albums, including three that were certified Gold, and three that peaked in the top twenty on the Billboard 200. Outside of his work with Relient K, Thiessen leads a side project called Matthew Thiessen and the Earthquakes, which released its debut album Wind Up Bird in 2018. In 2009, he co-produced and collaborated on Owl City's album Ocean Eyes.

== Career ==
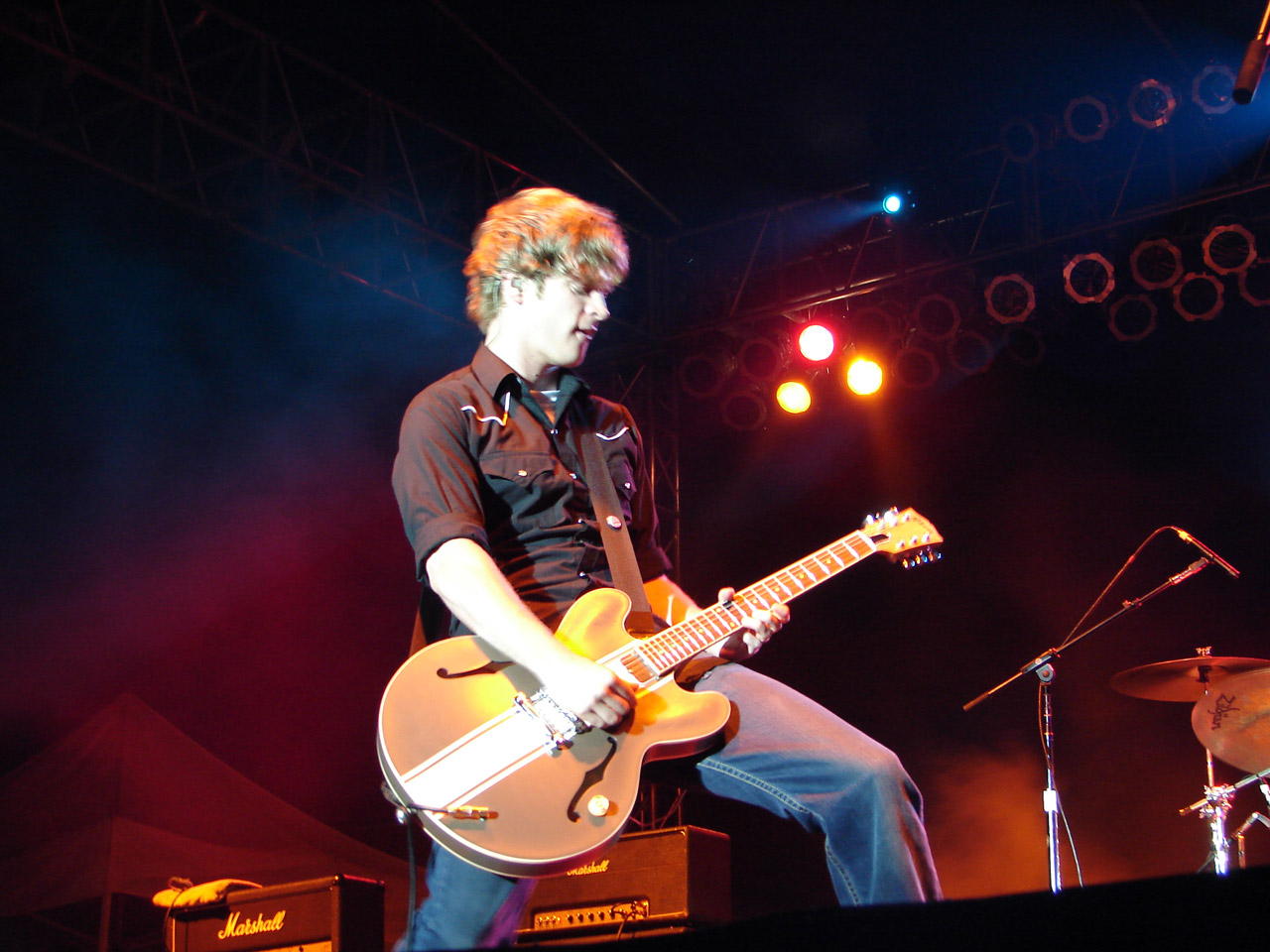
Thiessen performing with Relient K in 2006

=== Relient K ===
Thiessen founded Relient K in 1998, with guitarist Matt Hoopes, and bassist Brian Pittman, and recorded the demo All Work & No Play the same year. The recording attracted the interest of Toby McKeehan, who signed the band to his label Gotee Records. Relient K was released on April 25, 2000, the group's first full-length CD. The band released their second studio album, The Anatomy of the Tongue in Cheek, on August 28, 2001, which was certified Gold by the Recording Industry Association of America. The band's third studio album Two Lefts Don't Make a Right...but Three Do was released on March 11, 2003, and was also certified Gold by the RIAA. On November 2, 2004, their fourth studio album Mmhmm was released on both Capitol Records and Gotee, and peaked at number fifteen on the Billboard 200. It was certified Gold by the RIAA in 2005. In 2007, Gotee, Capitol, and EMI released Relient K's fifth studio album, Five Score and Seven Years Ago, which peaked at number six on the Billboard 200. After the release of the double EP The Bird and the Bee Sides in 2008, the band signed with Gotee's Mono Vs. Stereo imprint, on which they released their sixth studio album, Forget and Not Slow Down, again reaching the top twenty of the Billboard 200. Thiessen and the other members of Relient K have taken up A&R positions for the label as part of the record deal.

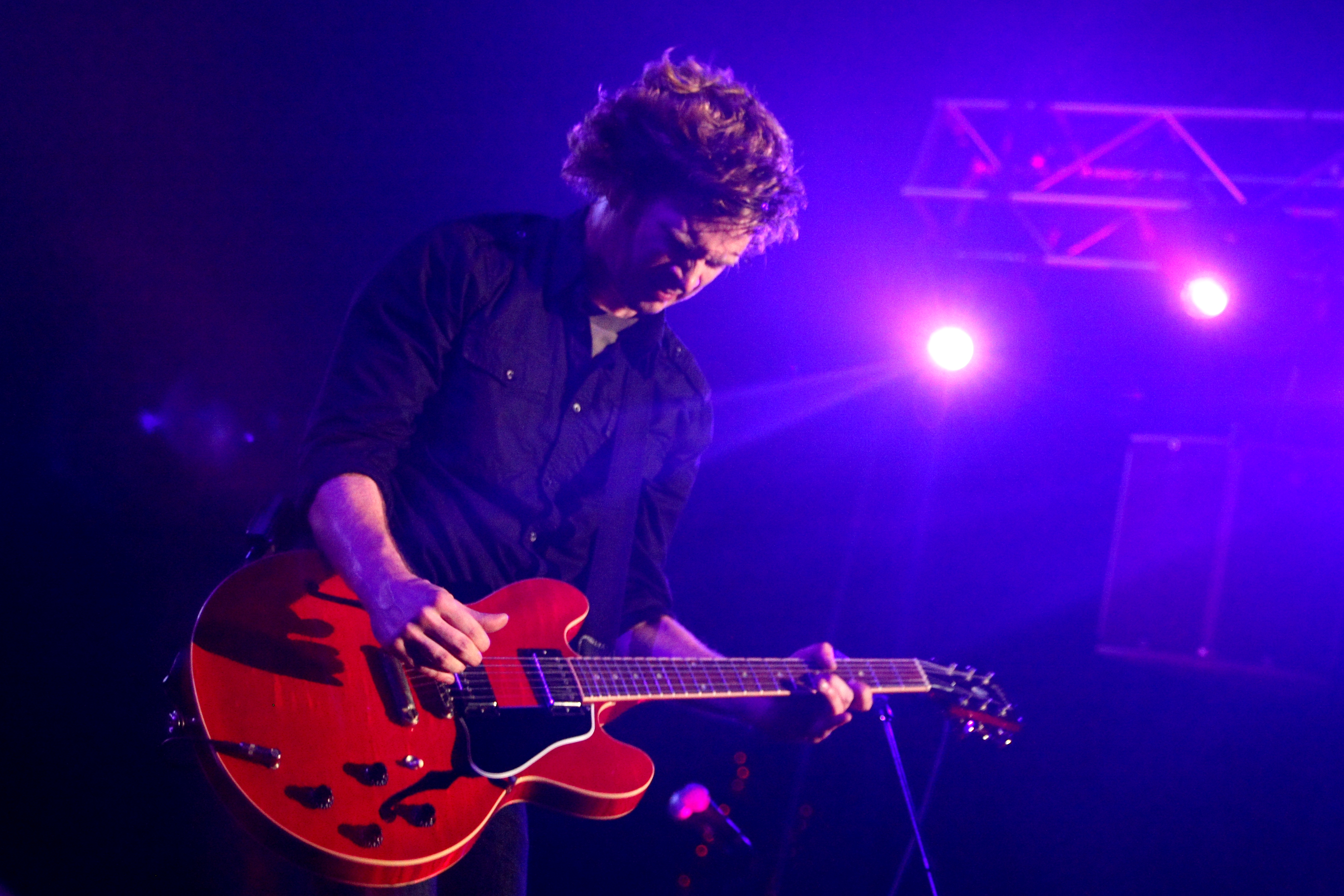
Thiessen performing with Relient K in 2008

Thiessen has been the lead vocalist, frontman, guitarist, primary songwriter, and, along with guitarist/backing vocalist Matt Hoopes, the only member who has been in the band for its entire history. Because of this position of musical leader, he maintains the most creative and artistic control of the band members. He has also served as co-producer on several occasions as well. As the band matured musically, Thiessen started being credited with piano in most releases, beginning with The Anatomy of the Tongue in Cheek in 2001. Since the release of Mmhmm in 2004, his piano playing started becoming more prominent, and he began including a piano onstage as well.

=== Solo projects and collaborations ===
In addition to being in Relient K, Thiessen plays in his own solo piano project called Matthew Thiessen and the Earthquakes. Prior to 2018, the project had released a total of five songs on various samplers and compilation albums from Gotee and Mono Vs. Stereo, and several songs written for the project have been re-recorded on Relient K releases. In 2010, after the release and supporting tour of Forget and Not Slow Down, Thiessen announced that he would begin work on a full-length solo album. Although he had previously expressed interest in recording a studio release, he had placed his priority on Relient K, and relegated his solo work to his free time.

In April 2018, Adam Young of Owl City announced that Matthew Thiessen and the Earthquakes would be joining them on tour later in the year. In June 2018, Thiessen announced that his debut album under Matthew Thiessen and the Earthquakes, Wind Up Bird, would release later that summer.

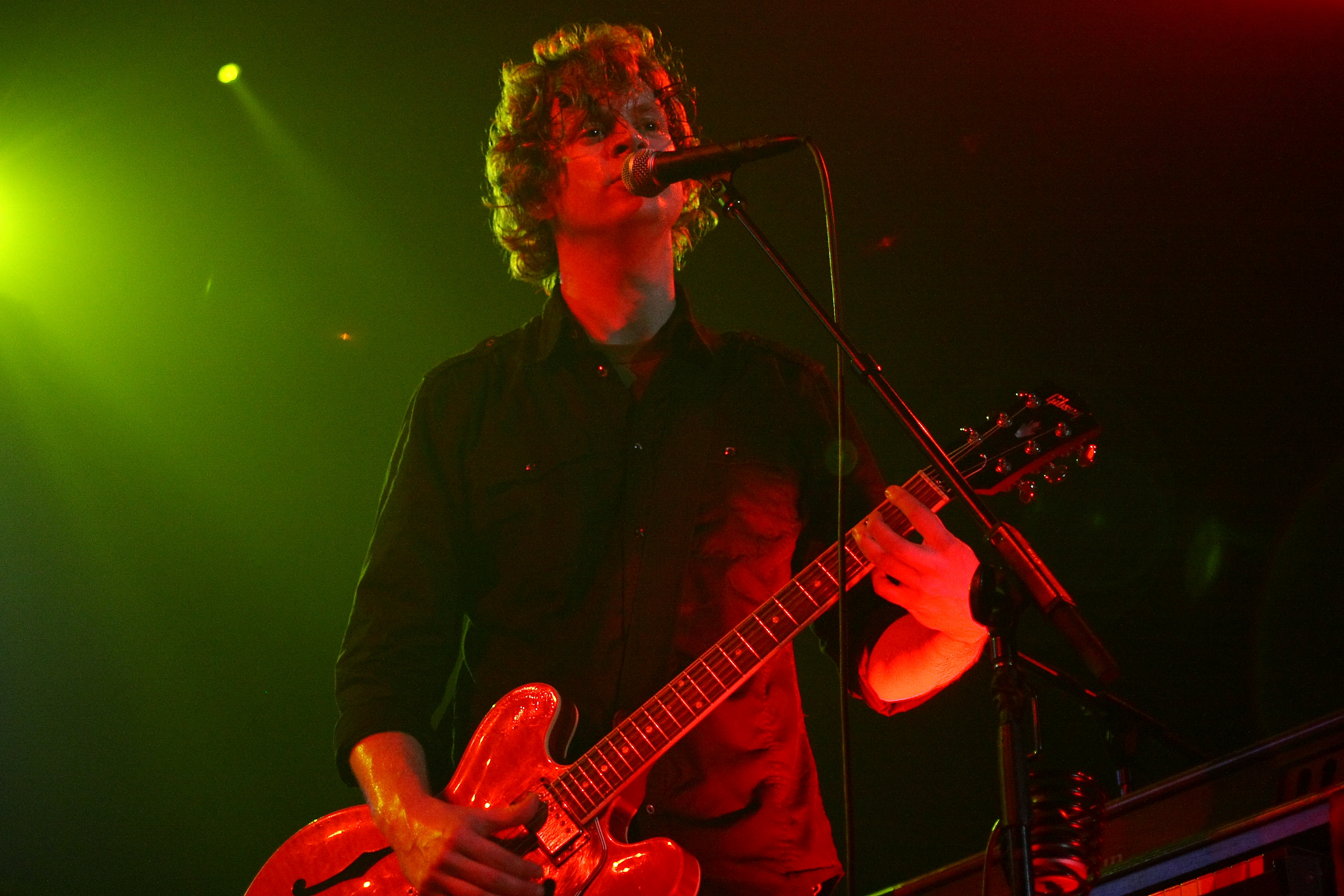
Thiessen performing in 2008

Thiessen has occasionally collaborated with Jon Foreman of Switchfoot. After initial interest in recording vocals for a Switchfoot song, it instead worked out for Foreman to contribute vocals for the Relient K song "Deathbed" from Five Score and Seven Years Ago. He later contributed songwriting and vocals to the Switchfoot release "Rebuild" in 2007, in conjunction for the Appetite for Construction Tour.

In 2009, he contributed vocals, songwriting, and production to Owl City's major-label debut Ocean Eyes, which has sold over 4,000,000 copies worldwide and reached the top ten on the Billboard 200. Lead single "Fireflies" reached number one on the Billboard Hot 100 in late October, and was a global success, topping the charts in many countries including Australia, Denmark, the Netherlands, and the United Kingdom. Thiessen continues to work with Owl City's Adam Young and contributes vocals to "Plant Life", a song on the album, All Things Bright and Beautiful. He also co-wrote "Good Time" with Owl City and Brian Lee. Thiessen has also made guest contributions on a number of releases with other artists, including Blackbear, John Reuben, tobyMac and The Fold.

=== Musical style and influences ===
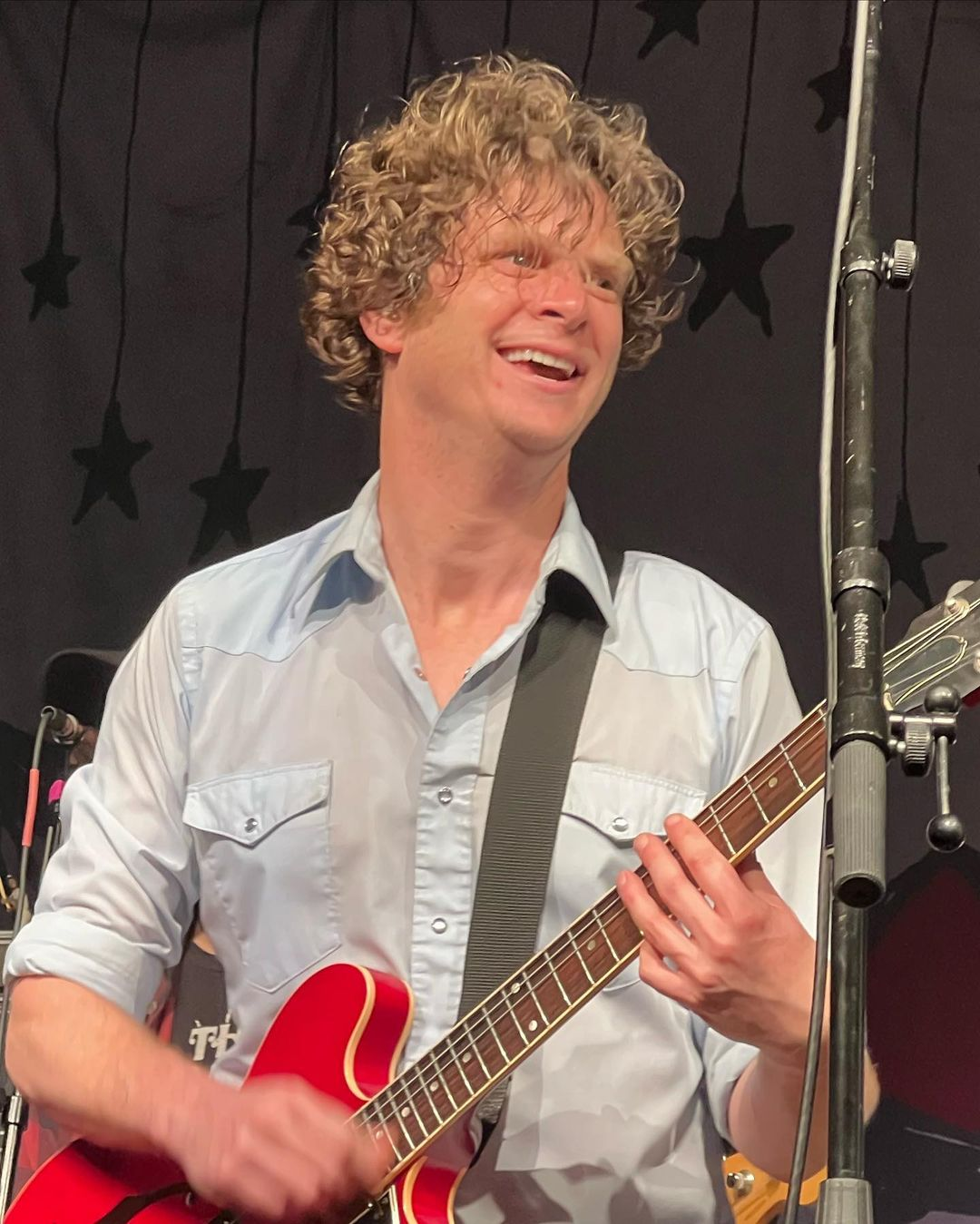
Thiessen performing with Relient K in 2022

Thiessen has received piano lessons since he was seven years old, with early interests in ragtime and Scott Joplin, specifically the soundtrack from The Sting. He taught himself guitar at the age of 14 by learning to play songs by grunge bands like Silverchair and Nirvana. Thiessen does not use guitar picks while playing; he instead uses his thumb. According to Matt Hoopes, this is because he can't. Since Relient K's early days, Thiessen's main influences have been in the pop punk genre, specifically NOFX, Less Than Jake, Ghoti Hook, MxPx, and Goldfinger. He later introduced influences from Simon & Garfunkel, Ben Folds, and The Beach Boys, whom he has named as his favorite band. Thiessen has claimed that after years of writing and performing pop-punk songs, he now finds writing slower music more enjoyable. He has described his Matt Thiessen and the Earthquakes side project as being influenced by Rufus Wainwright and Ben Folds.

=== Guitars ===
Though he has played several guitars throughout his career, Thiessen is best known for playing Gibson ES-335s and has also been seen playing a Gibson Tom DeLonge Signature ES-333 occasionally.

== Personal life ==
Thiessen was born in St. Catharines, Ontario. His parents divorced when he was six years old and living in Stevensville, Ontario. Later, his mother remarried and the family moved to Bolivar, Ohio, where he met and befriended future bandmates Matt Hoopes and Brian Pittman. The three have said that they have known each other since first or second grade. He is a graduate of Tuscarawas Valley High School, where he was also voted Class President in 1998. He also attended Malone University.

Thiessen dated future pop star Katy Perry for a time from 2003 until 2005, and wrote several songs with her and Glen Ballard during her early recording sessions. One of the songs the three wrote, "Long Shot", would go on to be recorded by Kelly Clarkson on her 2009 album All I Ever Wanted. Remaining on good terms with Perry, he also co-wrote "Dressin' Up from Teenage Dream: The Complete Confection.

In 2008, it was announced that Thiessen proposed to Shannon Murphy, a morning radio co-host of the "Mojo in the Morning" show based in Detroit. The couple planned for an August 22, 2009 wedding. However, the engagement was terminated in December of that year. Murphy later reported that, though they were no longer together, they were on good terms.

Thiessen married Emily Wright on August 23, 2015, in New York City, with Matt Hoopes as his best man. They kept the engagement and marriage a secret from the public. The couple divorced in February 2018.

== Solo discography ==
=== Studio Albums (as Matthew Thiessen and the Earthquakes) ===
Title	Album details
Wind Up Bird	Released: August 2018; Format: LP, DL

=== Compilation appearances (as Matthew Thiessen and the Earthquakes) ===
Year	Album	Song(s)	Label(s)
2001	Happy Christmas, Vol. 3	"I Hate Christmas Parties"	Gotee Records
2003	The Revolution Will Begin in the Blink of an Eye, Vol. 1	"Poison Ivy"	Mono Vs. Stereo
2005	The Revolution Will Begin in the Blink of an Eye, Vol. 2	"The Calendar, The Energy (If This Is You Then Woe Is Me)"	Mono Vs. Stereo
2006	My Other Band, Vol. 1	"The Calendar, The Energy (If This Is You Then Woe Is Me)" "The Warmth of the Sun" "Faking My Own Suicide" (Demo) "Poison Ivy" (iTunes bonus track only)	Mono Vs. Stereo

=== Collaborations ===
Year	Collaborator(s)	Contribution	Song(s)	Album
2004	Everyday Sunday	backing vocals	"The One"	Anthems for the Imperfect
2005	The Wedding	backing vocals	"But a Breath"	The Wedding
2005	John Reuben	vocals	"Nuisance"	The Boy Vs. the Cynic
2005	Katy Perry	songwriting	"Simple"	The Sisterhood of the Traveling Pants (Music from the Motion Picture)
2005	Katy Perry	songwriting	"Box", "Diamonds", "It's Okay to Believe"	
2006	The Fold	backing vocals	"I Believe You"	This Too Shall Pass
2007	Switchfoot	songwriting, vocals	"Rebuild"	
2008	Family Force 5	remixing, vocals	"The First Time"	Dance or Die with a Vengeance
2008	Rookie of the Year	piano	all tracks	Sweet Attention
2008	Rookie of the Year	vocals	"Danger Zone"	Sweet Attention
2008	Ace Enders and a Million Different People	vocals	"Bittersweet Symphony"	Bittersweet Symphony - Single
2008	The Media Says	piano	"Summer Lovin'", "Keep Falling Down"	Forgive Us If We Make You Smile - EP
2008	Ellington	piano	all tracks	More Like a Movie, Less Like Real Life
2008	Ellington	vocals	"In A Lonely Place"	More Like a Movie, Less Like Real Life
2008	Katy Perry	songwriting	"A Cup of Coffee"	One of the Boys
2009	Kelly Clarkson, (with Katy Perry and Glen Ballard)	songwriting	"Long Shot"	All I Ever Wanted
2009	Owl City	songwriting, production, vocals	"Cave In", "Fireflies", "Tidal Wave", "The Bird and the Worm"	Ocean Eyes
2009	Deas Vail	vocals	"Birds"	Birds & Cages
2010	TobyMac	vocals	"Wonderin"	Tonight
2010	Rookie of the Year	piano	"Bizarre Love Triangle"	The Most Beautiful
2011	Owl City	songwriting, vocals	"Plant Life"	All Things Bright and Beautiful
2011	Jack's Mannequin	songwriting	"Amy, I", "People, Running", "Platform Fire"	People and Things
2011	Run Kid Run	vocals	"Sunburns"	Patterns
2012	Katy Perry	songwriting	"Dressin' Up"	Teenage Dream: The Complete Confection
2012	Owl City	songwriting, production, vocals	"Shooting Star", "I'm Coming After You", "Speed of Love", "Good Time", "Metropolis", "Bombshell Blonde"	The Midsummer Station
2012	Owl City	songwriting, production	"When Can I See You Again?"	Wreck-It Ralph
2012	William Beckett	songwriting	"Slip Away"	What Will Be - EP
2012	blackbear	songwriting, vocals	"Cold Coffee"	Sex: The Mixtape
2013	Kristian Bush	songwriting	"Love or Money	
2013	Big Time Rush	songwriting	"Get Up", "Untouchable"	24/Seven
2013	Owl City	songwriting	"Live It Up"	The Smurfs 2: Music from and Inspired by
2013	Owl City, TobyMac	songwriting	"Light of Christmas"	Light of Christmas
2014	The Fray	songwriting	"Closer to Me", "Wherever This Goes", "Shadow and a Dancer", "500,000 Acres"	Helios
2014	R5	songwriting	"Smile"	Sometime Last Night
2014	Owl City	songwriting	"Kiss Me Babe, It's Christmas Time"	
2015	Owl City	songwriting, vocals	"Verge"	Mobile Orchestra
2015	Owl City	songwriting	"Unbelievable", "Back Home"	Mobile Orchestra
2015	Ben Rector	songwriting	"Crazy"	Brand New
2016	Birds in the Airport	songwriting	"Dozing Off"	Domesticated Drowsiness - EP
2017	COIN	songwriting	"Don't Cry, 2020", "Hannah"	How Will You Know If You Never Try
2017	Vinyl Theatre	songwriting	"Fade Away"	Origami
2017	Owl City	songwriting	"Clap Your Hands"	Featured in Everybody's Golf
2017	TobyMac	vocals (as Relient K)	"Can't Wait for Christmas"	Light of Christmas
2018	Gin Wigmore	songwriting	"Cold Cave"	Ivory
2018	Owl City	songwriting, vocals	"All My Friends", "All My Friends (Alt Version)"	Cinematic
2018	Luthi	songwriting	"StealinLovin"	Stranger
2018	Billy Raffoul	songwriting, background vocals	"1975"	1975 - EP
2018	Rusty Clanton	songwriting	"Takes One to Know One"	
2019	Billy Raffoul	songwriting, vocals, guitar	"When We Were Young"	A Few More Hours at YYZ (Vinyl Version)
2021	Machine Gun Kelly	composition, lyrics	"Love Race"	
2023	Switchfoot	vocals (as Relient K)	"Ammunition (Relient K Version)"	The Beautiful Letdown (Our Version) [Deluxe Edition]
