= Danielle Kimmey =

American singer

Joy Danielle Kimmey-Torrez
- Also known as: Danielle Kimmey
- Born: Joy Danielle Kimmey; October 20, 1982 (age 43)
- Origin: Richmond, Virginia, United States
- Genres: CCM, Gospel, Pop, Soul, R&B
- Occupation: Singer/songwriter
- Years active: 1994–2006
- Label: Gotee Records
- Formerly of: Out of Eden

Joy Danielle Kimmey-Torrez (born October 20, 1982) is a singer in the genre of contemporary Christian music who, with her sisters Lisa Kimmey and Andrea Kimmey-Baca, performed for twelve years in the Grammy-nominated group Out of Eden.

== Early years ==
Danielle was born in Richmond, Virginia, to parents Robert Kimmey and DeLise Perkins Kimmey Hall. Danielle has two sisters, Lisa and Andrea. When Danielle was a child, her parents divorced and she moved with her mother and sisters to Nashville, where DeLise was offered a teaching position at Fisk University. Danielle and her sisters initially sang back-up for their mother, who was a classical pianist. After their stepfather unsuccessfully attempted to garner attention for the girls by sending a video of their singing to various record labels, Danielle and her sisters were discovered by Toby McKeehan, who formed the record label Gotee Records to produce their music.

== Out of Eden ==
Out of Eden was a group for twelve years, performing from 1994 to 2006; Danielle was twelve years old when the group began. As a group they experienced various challenges. Initially, as people preferred traditional gospel music, there was difficulty finding a market for their music. Later, in 1998, a canceled tour presented the group with financial difficulties. However, after a rocky start, the groups developed many fans worldwide, allowing them to publish seven records and tour a variety of places, entertaining in Africa and performing for the U.S. Army. The group won the Urban Recorded Song of the Year and tied for Urban Album of the Year at the 2003 GMA Dove Awards, before disbanding in 2006.

== Later career ==
Since July 2007, Danielle has been on the staff of Interlínc in the Artist Services Department, where she serves as an Artist Services Coordinator. In 2008, Danielle participated in the Revolve Tour, where she and such artists as Krystal Meyers and Natalie Grant performed for and spoke to teenage girls about such issues as self-esteem and relationships with God, friends, and family. Previously, she helped operate All Most Famous, an entertainment/promotions/event planning company, which hosted such parties as "All Most Famous Launch Party", "LNK 25", "Old School vs. New School Hip Hop Party", "October Baby Party", and "Trick Or Skeet", which featured LA's DJ Skeet Skeet; her parties reportedly attracted an average of 300–600 attendants.

== Discography ==
=== Albums ===
- 2006: Out of Eden: The Hits
- 2005: Hymns
- 2004: Love, Peace & Happiness
- 2002: This Is Your Life
- 1999: No Turning Back
- 1996: More Than You Know
- 1994: Lovin' The Day

== External sources ==
- Interview with Danielle Kimmey — By Dwayne Lacey of GospelFlava.com
- Out of Eden — Christianity Today, Artist Page
