= The Creepy EP =

EP by Relient K
- Released: August 28, 2001
- Recorded: 2001
- Length: 25:59
- Label: Gotee
- Producer: Mark Lee Townsend

Relient K chronology
Relient K (2000)	The Creepy EP (2001)	The Anatomy of the Tongue in Cheek (2001)

The Creepy EP is the second EP by American rock band Relient K. The EP was released on August 28, 2001, coinciding the release of their second studio album The Anatomy of the Tongue in Cheek. It contains two songs from their later full-length release, The Anatomy of the Tongue in Cheek, and four exclusive tracks.

== Background and release ==
The Creepy EP features "Pressing On" and "Those Words Are Not Enough" which also appears on The Anatomy of the Tongue in Cheek, "Operation" which did not appear on the album, but was included on their compilation album The First Three Gears. The EP also includes two acoustic versions of "Softer to Me" and "Pressing On", with the latter composed of lawn mower noises in the last three minutes. The EP's fifth track, a demo version of "Jefferson Airplane" was later featured on The Birds and the Bee Sides.

Physical copies of the EP would no longer be available for print. However, the EP remains available for digital download on their website.

On November 13, 2015, the EP was re-released as 7" vinyl packaged with The Vinyl Countdown, via Gotee Records.

== Track listing ==
All tracks are written by Matt Thiessen except "Those Words Are Not Enough", written by Matt Hoopes.

No.	Title	Length
1.	"Pressing On"	3:31
2.	"Those Words Are Not Enough"	4:49
3.	"Operation"	2:32
4.	"Softer to Me" (acoustic)	4:12
5.	"Jefferson Airplane" (demo)	3:56
6.	"Pressing On" (Back Porch acoustic)	6:59

== Personnel ==
Credits adapted from album's liner notes.

Relient K

- Matt Thiessen – lead vocals, guitar, piano
- Matt Hoopes – guitar, backing vocals
- Brian Pittman – bass
- Dave Douglas – drums, backing vocals

Production

- Mark Lee Townsend – producer
- Toby McKeehan – executive producer
- Joey Elwood – executive producer

== Release history ==
Release dates and formats for The Creepy EP
Region	Date	Format	Label	Ref.
United States	August 28, 2001	CD	Gotee	
