= All Work & No Play =

Demo album by Relient K
- Released: June 20, 1998
- Recorded: February 1998
- Genres: Christian punk, punk rock
- Length: 28:30
- Label: CREC
- Producer: Mark Lee Townsend

Relient K chronology
All Work & No Play (1998)	2000 A.D.D. (2000)

Professional ratings
Review scores
Source	Rating
Jesus Freak Hideout	2/5 stars

All Work & No Play is the demo CD released by the Christian rock band Relient K in 1998. It caught the attention of dcTalk's Toby McKeehan, who subsequently signed them to Gotee Records.

Seven of the eleven tracks on this album were eventually remade on either the band's first or second full-length albums. "Cojack", "Register", "Be Rad", and "William" were never re-made for another album, unlike all the others, and are only available on this album.

Like most of Relient K's early work the songs make several references to pop-culture, including; * "K Car" refers to the Plymouth Reliant K, based on the K Car platform, for which the band is named, "I'm Lion-O" refers to the main character, Lion-O, of the 1980s cartoon Thundercats, "My Good Friend Charles" references the 1980s sitcom Charles in Charge, and in the song "K Car" uses the line "And Brandon Ebel just gave us a call" referring to the founder of the record label, Tooth & Nail Records.

The CD had a limited release by CREC records, the album cover was the same with different CD art. Only a limited number of the album were ever produced. CREC Records was given cease and desist order in 2005 to stop distribution of the album, and they complied.

On the cover of the album, there is a square around the K. In an interview, Matt Thiessen and Matt Hoopes talked about the Reliant K Car, and how they named the band. Matt Thiessen said they saw a rectangle around the K on the back of the car, and they said, "That would make a cool logo". Thiessen also pointed out that they were fifteen when they thought of that.

== Track listing ==
All tracks are written by Matt Thiessen.

No.	Title	Length
1.	"K Car" (re-recorded for the band's eponymous debut, Relient K.)	2:36
2.	"I'm Lion-O" (re-recorded for the band's second album, The Anatomy of the Tongue in Cheek.)	3:43
3.	"Staples" (re-recorded for the band's eponymous debut, Relient K.)	3:00
4.	"Marilyn Manson Ate My Girlfriend" (re-recorded and released on the band's debut album, Relient K, as "My Girlfriend".)	3:01
5.	"Cojack"	2:44
6.	"My Good Friend Charles" (re-recorded and released on the band's debut album, Relient K, as "Charles in Charge".)	2:44
7.	"Register"	1:41
8.	"Be Rad"	2:14
9.	"C.U.R.B." (rewritten as "For the Moments I Feel Faint", which appeared on the band's second album, The Anatomy of the Tongue in Cheek.)	3:16
10.	"William"	2:01
11.	"Softer to Me" (re-recorded and released on the band's debut album, Relient K.)	2:03

== Credits ==
- Matt Thiessen – lead vocals, guitar
- Matt Hoopes – guitar, backing vocals
- Brian Pittman – bass guitar
- Todd Frascone – drums
