= Feels Like the First Time (disambiguation) =

"Feels Like the First Time" is the 1977 debut single by the British-American rock band Foreigner.

Feels Like the First Time may also refer to:

== Songs ==
- "Feels Like the First Time" (Sinitta song), written J. G. Hargreaves 1986
- "Feels Like the First Time", by Pepsi and Shirlie from All Right Now, 1987
- "Feels Like the First Time", by Beverley Craven from Love Scenes, 1993
- "Feels Like the First Time", by Intro, 1995
- "Feels Like the First Time", by Corinne Bailey Rae from album The Sea, 2010
- "Feels like the First Time", by Reborn from Finding Favour, 2015

== Other uses ==
- Feels Like The First Time, 2009 novel by Tawny Weber
