= My Girlfriend (Relient K song) =

2000 single by Relient K

Single by Relient K

from the album Relient K
- Released: 2000
- Genre: Pop punk; Christian rock
- Length: 2:47
- Label: Gotee; Capitol
- Songwriter(s): Matthew Thiessen
- Producer(s): Mark Lee Townsend

Relient K singles chronology
"My Girlfriend" (2000)	"Wake Up Call" (2000)

Music video
- "My Girlfriend" on YouTube

"My Girlfriend" is the debut single by the Christian rock band Relient K, released on their self-titled first album. The song originally appeared as "Marilyn Manson Ate My Girlfriend" on the band's demo album, All Work and No Play.

== Background ==
Originally titled "Marilyn Manson Ate My Girlfriend", the song first appeared on the group's demo album All Work and No Play, released on June 20, 1998. The demo album landed them a record deal with Gotee. The group presented the song to dc Talk's Toby McKeehan, who recalled the song being "funny." On the group's first album, the song "Hello McFly" features a tongue in cheek line leading into "My Girlfriend", "A song about Marilyn Manson will never, ever be on a CD put out by Gotee Records. Period!." The line was said by McKeehan.

The song is about Marilyn Manson eating Matt Thiessen's girlfriend. Thiessen wrote this song when he was 15 years old. Thiessen has said that he wrote it because of a female friend, who lived eight hours away in Pennsylvania, who he would talk to about many things including spiritual matters such as where God was taking them in the future. His friend would later turn from Christian music to Nine Inch Nails and Marilyn Manson. In an interview with CCM Magazine, Thiessen stated "through this she changed her lifestyle [and] what she believed in." His friend would later be expelled from school and would be kicked out of her house and sent to a youth detention center. Thiessen would later state "She felt that Christianity was stupid and just this big hypocrisy. Being young and impressionable, I just wrote this little, stupid song, but that was the way I dealt with it—writing this song about how she got so consumed by Marilyn Manson."

The song caused controversy among the Christian music world. Thiessen stated "Some moms didn't want their kids listening to our records and stuff, but that's expected. People look for stuff like that sometimes just because they want to be safe all the time." When asked if the band still played the song, Thiessen stated "We're a little tired of it, but it's still a fun song. You know how a lot of bands have their cliché one song about a girl, the relationship that went wrong or all that stuff? We don't actually have any of those right now. I think we may in the future. You never know how it goes." In an interview in Detroit at the 2005 Warped Tour, Thiessen stated the song was retired from being performed live in 2002 during their Australian tour.

== Awards and nominations ==
The song's music video received a Billboard Music Award and a GMA Dove Award nomination.

== Music video ==
The music video for "My Girlfriend" was the first released by the band—in it, the members of Relient K rescue "The Girlfriend" from inside of Marilyn Manson. They search through Manson's organs, which are all behind doors inside a hall. In the end, they rescue the girlfriend after Matt Thiessen defeats Marilyn Manson in a game of rock-paper-scissors.

"My Girlfriend" was the only music video by the band to feature drummer Stephen Cushman.

== Track listing ==
CD single
No.	Title	Length
1.	"My Girlfriend" (radio mix)	2:29
2.	"My Girlfriend" (album version with edits)	2:29
3.	"My Girlfriend" (album version)	2:47

== Personnel ==
Credits for "My Girlfriend" adapted from album's liner notes.

Relient K

- Matt Thiessen – lead vocals, guitar
- Matt Hoopes – guitar, backing vocals
- Brian Pittman – bass guitar
- Stephen Cushman – drums, backing vocals

Production

- Mark Lee Townsend – producer, recording
- Russ Long – mixing at The Carport (Nashville, Tennessee)
- Erik Wolf – mastering at Wolf Mastering (Nashville, Tennessee)

== Release history ==
Release history for "My Girlfriend"
Region	Date	Format	Label	Ref.
United States	2000	CD single	Gotee	
