= No Turning Back (Out of Eden album) =

Studio album by Out Of Eden
- Released: June 15, 1999
- Genres: R&B/pop; Urban contemporary gospel Inspirational
- Label: Gotee Records
- Producers: TobyMac (aka Toby McKeehan), Lisa Kimmey, Todd Collins, Michael Linn, Sheri Blair

Out Of Eden chronology
More Than You Know (1996)	No Turning Back (1999)	This Is Your Life (2002)

Singles from No Turning Back
- 1. "River" Released: 1999; 2. "Here's My Heart" Released: 1999; 3. "Tomorrow" Released: 2000

Professional ratings
Review scores
Source	Rating
Allmusic	3/5 stars

No Turning Back is the third album from Christian R&B/urban-pop group Out of Eden. It was released in 1999 by Gotee Records and found the trio pairing a modern fashion aesthetic and progressive contemporary R&B/pop production with their lyricism.

== Track listing ==
1. Lookin' For Love (feat. Knowdaverbs and Grits)
2. River
3. Spirit Moves
4. Here's My Heart (feat. The Katinas)
5. Window
6. If You Really Knew
7. Tomorrow
8. Open Up Your Heart
9. Draw You Near
10. No Turning Back (feat. Grits)
11. Sarah Jane

== Charts ==
Chart (1999)	Peak position
U.S. Billboard Top Heatseekers	9
U.S. Billboard Top Contemporary Christian	6
