= Abandon Kansas (EP) =

EP by Abandon Kansas
- Released: February 8, 2011
- Recorded: 2010
- Genre: Christian rock, Christian pop
- Length: 23:23
- Label: Gotee Records

Abandon Kansas chronology
We're All Going Somewhere EP (2009)	Abandon Kansas (2011)	Ad Astra Per Aspera (2011)

Abandon Kansas is the sixth studio EP by the American Christian rock band Abandon Kansas. It is the second EP released on Gotee Records. The EP was released digitally on February 8, 2011 as a free download on Amazon.com.

== Track listing ==
No.	Title	Length
1.	"Heaven Come My Way"	4:17
2.	"The Golden State"	3:43
3.	"Months and Years"	3:41
4.	"Close Your Eyes"	3:54
5.	"The Golden State" (music video)	3:54
6.	"Close Your Eyes" (music video)	3:54
