= Ad Astra per Aspera (album) =

Studio album by Abandon Kansas
- Released: March 8, 2011
- Recorded: 2010
- Genres: Christian rock, Christian pop
- Length: 40:32
- Label: Gotee

Abandon Kansas chronology
Abandon Kansas (2011)	Ad Astra per Aspera (2011)	alligator (2015)

Professional ratings
Review scores
Source	Rating
AbsolutePunk	8/10 stars
Christian Music Zine	5/5 stars
Indie Vision Music	7/10 stars
Jesus Freak Hideout	4/5 stars

Ad Astra per Aspera is the second studio album by the American Christian rock band Abandon Kansas. It is their first album released by Gotee Records.

The track "Liar" is a re-release of "Minutes" which featured on their first album. The track "Heaven Come My Way" was featured on an episode of The CW game show Oh Sit!.

== Track listing ==
No.	Title	Length
1.	"Heaven Come My Way"	4:17
2.	"Liar"	3:21
3.	"Like It or Not"	3:38
4.	"The Golden State"	3:43
5.	"A Conversation with the Sky"	4:49
6.	"Where Else Can We Go"	3:52
7.	"Take My Lead"	4:08
8.	"Wings (Fear of Heights)"	3:50
9.	"Learn"	3:23
10.	"Give & Take"	5:31

Amazon exclusive track
No.	Title	Length
11.	"Don't Forget Where You Came From"	4:06
