= Lori Wilde =

American novelist

Laurie Blalock Vanzura
- Lori Wilde at the Romance Writers of America Conference, July 2015, New York, NY
- Born: Laurie Blalock; Texas, United States
- Education: Weatherford College
- Occupations: Nurse, novelist
- Spouse: Bill Vanzura
- Writing career
- Pen name: Laura Anthony, Lori Wilde
- Language: English
- Period: 1994–present
- Genre: Romance novel
- Website: www.loriwilde.com

Laurie Blalock Vanzura (born Texas, United States) is an American author of contemporary romance novels, first under the pseudonym Laura Anthony, and now as Lori Wilde.

== Biography ==
Laurie Blalock was born in Texas, United States. She wrote her first short story at age eight, and finished her first novel four years later. At sixteen, she submitted a story to Alfred Hitchcock Magazine. Although it was rejected, she received a handwritten note telling her to keep writing. She continued to write, finishing 60 short stories over the next 10 years, persisting even while attending nursing school. All of her short stories were rejected, and a writing teacher finally suggested, in 1990, that she try to write a novel. Wilde took the teacher's advice, and in 1994 sold her second completed work to Silhouette Romance under the pseudonym Laura Anthony. Wilde wrote 11 novels under that name, with one becoming a finalist for the Romance Writers of America RITA Award.

Until 2004, Wilde wrote category romances for Harlequin, primarily in their Duet and Blaze lines. Her first single title, License to Thrill, was published in 2003. Wilde has been nominated three times for Romantic Times Reviewers' Choice Awards, for Coaxing Cupid, Packed With Pleasure, and Santa's Sexy Secret. She has also been nominated for a Romantic Times Career Achievement Award in series love and laughter.

She has won first place in The Colorado Award of Excellence, the More than Magic, The Wisconsin Right Touch, The Laurel Wreath, The Desert Rose Golden Quill and the Lories. In 2007 she was also honored as distinguished alumna by Weatherford College.

In 2010, her book The First Love Cookie Club was on the USA Today and The New York Times best seller lists for five weeks.

== Bibliography ==
=== As Laura Anthony ===
==== Single novels ====
- Raleigh and the Rancher (1995)
- Second Chance Family (1995)
- Undercover Honeymoon (1996)
- Look-A-Like Bride (1997)
- The Stranger's Surprise (1997)
- Baby Business (1997)
- Bride of a Texas Trueblood (1998)
- Honey of a Husband (1998)
- Stranded with a Tall, Dark Stranger (1998)
- I Married the Boss (1999)
- The Twenty-four-hour Groom (1999)

=== As Lori Wilde ===
==== Single novels ====
- Santa's Sexy Secret (2000)
- Packed with Pleasure (2003)
- License to Thrill (2003)
- As You Like It (2004)
- Gotta Have It (2004)
- Racing Against the Clock (2004)
- Shockingly Sensual (2005)
- Saving Allegheny Green (2005)
- Angels and Outlaws (2006)
- Destiny's Hand (2006)
- Some Like It Hot (2006)
- You Only Love Twice (2006)
- My Secret Life (2007)
- The Right Stuff (2009)
- Sweet Surrender (2010)
- High Stakes Seduction (2011)
- Intoxicating (2011)

==== The Bachelors of Bear Creek ====
1. A Touch of Silk (2002)
2. Sexy, Single and Searching (2002)
3. Eager, Eligible and Alaskan (2002)
4. A Thrill to Remember (2002)
- The Bachelors of Bear Creek (2008)

==== Cooper Sister ====
1. Charmed and Dangerous (2004)
2. Mission: Irresistible (2005)

==== Wedding Veil Wishes ====
1. There Goes the Bride (2007)
2. Once Smitten, Twice Shy (2008)
3. Addicted to Love (2008)
4. All of Me (2009)

==== Perfect Anatomy ====
1. Crossing the line (2008)
2. Secret Seduction (2008)
3. Lethal Exposure (2008)

==== EROS Vacations ====
1. Zero Control (2009)
2. His Final Seduction (2010)

==== Twilight, Texas ====
1. The Sweethearts' Knitting Club (2009)
2. The True Love Quilting Club (2010)
3. The First Love Cookie Club (2010)
4. The Welcome Home Garden Club (2011)

==== Jubilee, Texas ====
1. The Cowboy Takes a Bride (2012)
2. The Cowboy and the Princess (2012)
3. A Cowboy for Christmas (2012)

==== Omnibus ====
- Bye, Bye Bachelorhood / Coaxing Cupid (2001)
- Sexy, Single and Searching / Eager, Eligible And Alaskan (2002)
- Kiss the Bride (2012)

==== Anthologies in collaboration ====
- Mistletoe and Mayhem / Santa's Sexy Secret (2000) (with Cara Summers)
- Going in Style / I Love Lacy (2001) (with Bonnie Tucker)
- Live to Tell / Racing Against the Clock (2004) (with Valerie Parv)
- Real Men Do It Better (2007) (with Carrie Alexander, Susan Donovan, Lora Leigh)
- Crossing the Line / Have Mercy (2008) (with Jo Leigh)
- Hell-Raiser / Secret Seduction (2008) (with Rhonda Nelson)
- In Bed with the Playboy (2009) (with Jane Sullivan, Tawny Weber)
- Dangerous / Angels & Outlaws (2009) (with Tori Carrington)
- Sand, Sun... Seduction(2009) (with Stephane Bond, Leslie Kelly)
- Lie with Me / Destiny's Hand (2009) (with Cara Summers)
- One-Click Buy: September 2010 (2010) (with Wendy Etherington, Karen Foley, Sarah Mayberry, Patricia Potter, Tawny Weber)
- By Invitation Only (2011) (with Wendy Etherington, Jillian Burns)
- The Phoenix / Born Ready (2012) (with Rhonda Nelson)
- Soldier's Seduction (2012) (with Jennifer LaBrecque)
