= Love, Peace & Happiness =

Love, Peace, & Happiness

Studio album by Out Of Eden
- Released: February 10, 2004
- Recorded: 2003–2004
- Genre: R&B/Pop; Urban contemporary gospel Inspirational
- Label: Gotee Records
- Producer: TobyMac (a.k.a. Toby McKeehan), Lisa Kimmey, Kene "Ghost" Bell, Mooki Taylor, Liquid Beats, Todd Collins, Incorporated Elements, Danielle Kimmey

Out Of Eden chronology
This Is Your Life (2002)	Love, Peace, & Happiness (2004)	Hymns (2005)

Professional ratings
Review scores
Source	Rating
Christianity Today	4/5 stars
MusiChristian.com	4.5/5 stars

Love, Peace & Happiness is the fifth album from Christian R&B/Urban-Pop group Out of Eden. It was released in early 2004 and features hit singles such as "Soldiers" and the title track.

== Track listing ==
Adapted from AllMusic.

1. Make Way (Lisa Kimmey, Mooki Taylor)
2. Just The Way (Lisa Kimmey, Mooki Taylor)
3. Love, Peace, And Happiness (Lisa Kimmey, Otto Price, Ric Robbins)
4. Soldiers (Lisa Kimmey, Kene "Ghost" Bell, Danielle Kimmey)
5. I Know (Lisa Kimmey, Victor Oquendo)
6. It's You (Lisa Kimmey, Mooki Taylor)
7. Should'a Listened (Lisa Kimmey, Todd Collins, Michael Ripoll)
8. Could've Been Me (Lisa Kimmey, Kene "Ghost" Bell)
9. Drama Free (Lisa Kimmey, Kene "Ghost" Bell, S. Appleton)
10. Tennessee Girls (Interlude)
11. Secret (Lisa Kimmey, Kene "Ghost" Bell)
12. Sincerely (Lisa Kimmey, Kene "Ghost" Bell, S. Appleton)

== Charts ==
Chart (2004)	Peak position
U.S. Billboard Top Heatseekers	20

== Personnel ==
From Allmusic.

=== Musicians ===
- Lisa Kimmey - Lead vocals, Background vocals
- Danielle Kimmey - Lead vocals, Background vocals
- Andrea Baca - Lead vocals, Background vocals
- Mr. Del - Rap
- Otto Price - Guitar, Bass
- Michael Ripoll - Guitar
- Andy Selby - Strings

=== Production ===
- Lisa Kimmey - Arranger, Producer, Executive Producer, Engineer
- TobyMac (a.k.a. Toby McKeehan) - Executive Producer
- Joey Elwood - Executive Producer
- Kene "Ghost" Bell - Arranger, Producer, Engineer
- Danielle Kimmey - Arranger, Producer
- Otto Price - Arranger, Producer
- Todd Collins - Producer, Engineer
- Mooki Taylor - Producer
- Ric Robbins - Producer
- Liquid Beats - Producer
- Incorporated Elements - Producer
- Marcelo Pennell - Engineer
- Steve Lotz - Engineer
- Serban Ghenea - Mixing
- Randy LeRoy - Mastering
- Eddy Boer - Creative Director
- Kwaku Alston - Photography
- Dawn Hayes - Stylist
