= This Is Your Life (Out of Eden album) =

Studio album by Out of Eden
- Released: 2002
- Recorded: 2002
- Genre: R&B, urban contemporary gospel, pop
- Label: Gotee
- Producer: TobyMac, Lisa Kimmey, Joey Elwood, Lee Jerkins, Donnie Scantz, Jamie Portee, Todd Collins, Tony McAnany

Out of Eden chronology
No Turning Back (1999)	This Is Your Life (2002)	Love, Peace & Happiness (2004)

Professional ratings
Review scores
Source	Rating
AllMusic	4/5 stars
Christianity Today	3.5/5 stars
Cross Rhythms	10/10 stars
Jesus Freak Hideout	4.5/5 stars

This Is Your Life is the fourth studio album released from Christian R&B and gospel trio Out of Eden.

== Track listing ==
1. Different Now (Lisa Kimmey, Lee Jerkins, David Hackley)
2. Day Like Today (Lisa Kimmey, Donnie Scantz, Jamie Portee)
3. Paradise (Lisa Kimmey, Todd Collins)
4. Meditate (Lisa Kimmey, Nate "Love" Clemmons, "Big Mike" Clemmons, E. Roberson)
5. Now I Sing (Lisa Kimmey, Lee Jerkins, David Hackley)
6. Showpiece (Lisa Kimmey, A.J. Wolfe)
7. All You Need (Lee Jerkins, Lisa Kimmey, Lanette Stamper)
8. Praise You (Lisa Kimmey, Danielle Kimmey)
9. Rolling Stone (Lisa Kimmey)
10. This Is Your Life (Lisa Kimmey, Donnie Scantz, Jamie Portee)
11. I Am The One (Lisa Kimmey, Donnie Scantz, Jamie Portee)
12. Reprise (All You Need)

There are 2 versions of "Different Now"-the album version and a radio version which is available on the "WOW Hits 2002" compilation album. The radio version features a spoken intro over the trumpets at the beginning, while the album version has no speaking, only the trumpets.

If you rewind track 1 in your CD player approximately 1:20 back, you will hear a hidden intro by DJ Maj, discussing with group member Lisa Kimmey about the album.

Track 12, titled "Reprise" is simply a minute-and-a-half instrumental version of "All You Need".

== Trivia ==
- Los Angeles Angels first baseman Albert Pujols, a devout Christian, uses the group's song "Different Now" for his at-bat song.

== Chart history ==
Chart (2002)	Peak position
U.S. Billboard 200	178
