= Finding Favour (EP) =

Finding Favour EP

EP by Finding Favour
- Released: March 12, 2013
- Genre: Contemporary Christian music, contemporary worship music
- Length: 21:52
- Label: Gotee
- Producer: Dustin Burnett, Rob Hawkins, Christopher Stevens

Finding Favour chronology
| Finding Favour EP (2013) | Reborn (2015) |

Finding Favour EP is the debut EP from Christian band Finding Favour. The album released on March 12, 2013, by Gotee Records, and the producers on the EP are Dustin Burnett, Rob Hawkins and Christopher Stevens. This EP had two singles that were commercially and airplay successful "Slip On By" and "Shake the World", and it got positive critical reception.

== Critical reception ==
Professional ratings
Review scores
| Source | Rating |
|---|---|
| CCM Magazine | 3/5 stars |
| Christian Music Zine | 4.5/5 stars |
| Cross Rhythms | 8/10 squares |
| Indie Vision Music | 4/5 stars |
| Jesus Freak Hideout | 3/5 stars |
| Louder Than the Music | 4/5 stars |
| New Release Tuesday | 4.5/5 stars |

The eponymously titled EP Finding Favour garnered generally positive reception from seven music critics. At CCM Magazine, Grace Aspinwall rated the EP three stars out of five, writing that "Packed with a soulful and rich vocal, and strong songwriting, this project [...] will pique the interest of any fan of Needtobreathe." Cortney Warner of Jesus Freak Hideout rated the EP three stars out of five, stating that "the songs deliver catchy beats and encouraging lyrics with tried and true messages", however "it overall feels safe and more 'paint-by-numbers' than something that's fresh and creative." At Cross Rhythms, Graeme Crawford rated the EP eight out of ten squares, saying that the music contains "Epic, catchy, singable songs combined with a crystal clear production give this the feel of a much more established band." On the other hand, Crawford notes that the band "are running the risk of being a one-trick pony, but when the pony is this captivating is that really a concern? One to really look out for."

At Indie Vision Music, Jonathan Andre rated the EP four out of five stars, calling these "heartfelt songs that touch our hearts with encouragement and motivation." Louder Than the Music's Jono Davies rated EP four stars out of five, affirming that the band "have a solid sound which is mixed with some heartfelt lyrics that you can't help but enjoy." At New Release Tuesday, Sarah Fine rated the EP four-and-a-half stars out of five, proclaiming that "This EP is not to be missed… take my word for it." In addition, Fine cautions that musically "the waters are a tad choppy", yet noting them as being "Expert storytellers, their crafty way of weaving words has a way of gripping your heart and not letting go." Joshua Andre of Christian Music Zine rated the album four-and-a-half stars, indicating that the lead singers "vocals are sublime".

== Track listing ==
Tracklist
| No. | Title | Writer(s) | Producer(s) | Length |
|---|---|---|---|---|
| 1. | "Shake the World" | Allen Dukes, Blake NeeSmith, Michael Farren | Dustin Burnett | 4:03 |
| 2. | "Love Stepped In" | Dustin Daniels, Dukes, NeeSmith, Carl Cartee, Aaron Tomberlin, Nathan Tomberlin | Rob Hawkins | 3:42 |
| 3. | "Slip On By" | Dukes, NeeSmith, Christopher Stevens, N. Tomberlin | Christopher Stevens | 3:50 |
| 4. | "Hallelujah We Shall Rise" | Daniels, Dukes, NeeSmith, N. Tomberlin, Ed Cash | Hawkins | 3:53 |
| 5. | "Hero" | NeeSmith, Cash | Hawkins | 3:08 |
| 6. | "I Am" | Daniels, Dukes, NeeSmith, Cartee, A. Tomberlin, N. Tomberlin | Hawkins | 3:16 |
| Total length: | | | | 21:52 |
