= Two Lefts Don't Make a Right...but Three Do =

Studio album by Relient K
- Released: March 11, 2003
- Recorded: 2002
- Studio: Yellow Studios
- Genre: Pop punk; alternative rock; Christian rock
- Length: 59:34
- Label: Gotee
- Producer: Mark Lee Townsend; Matt Thiessen

Relient K chronology
| Employee of the Month EP (2002) | Two Lefts Don't Make a Right...but Three Do (2003) | The Vinyl Countdown (2003) |

Singles from Two Lefts Don't Make a Right...but Three Do
- 1. "Getting Into You/ I Am Understood" Released: 2003; 2. "Chap Stick, Chapped Lips & Things Like Chemistry" Released: 2003; 3. "Falling Out" Released: 2003; 4. "Forward Motion" Released: 2003

Alternative covers
- The four original covers of the album

Alternative cover
- Vinyl exclusive cover

Alternative cover
- Gold Edition slip cover

Two Lefts Don't Make a Right...but Three Do (often called Two Lefts) is the third full-length studio album released by Christian rock band Relient K. Released on March 11, 2003, the album peaked at No. 38 on the Billboard 200. It was nominated for a Grammy for Best Rock Gospel Album in 2004.

== Background and recording ==
Following the release of their critically acclaim second studio album The Anatomy of the Tongue in Cheek in 2001, the group headed to Yellow Studios in Canton, Ohio, to record their third studio album. They worked with Mark Lee Townsend, who produced the album, along with Matthew Thiessen. Randy Leroy mastered the album at Final Stage Mastering and was mixed by F. Reid Shippen at Recording Arts in Nashville.

In support of the album, the group embarked on the Everybody Wants To Rule The World Tour with Anberlin and Don't Look Down from September to November 2003.

== Release ==
The album was initially released with four different covers, each one depicting a separate car wreck. In November 2003, a reissued edition of the album was released, with its cover art depicting all four cars in a junkyard. It was also released as a combo pack with Deck the Halls, Bruise Your Hand.

A Gold Edition of the album was released on October 31, 2006. The idea for a Gold Edition of this album came from Gotee Records, who also released a Gold Edition of The Anatomy of the Tongue in Cheek on the same day. The Gold Edition of this album has remixed and remastered sound similar to Mmhmm (the album was remixed by the same people who mixed Mmhmm) and it is also enhanced with a music video for the song "Chap Stick, Chapped Lips, and Things Like Chemistry".

On the 20th anniversary for Two Lefts Don't Make a Right...but Three Do, the original album artwork was revealed by Gotee Records, which shows the band sitting in a blue room.

== Singles ==
The group released a double CD single "Getting Into You / I Am Understood?" in 2003. Both were serviced to Christian radio with the former peaking at number 25 on the US Hot Christian Songs chart, while the latter peaked at number six on the US Christian Rock Songs chart. "Chap Stick, Chapped Lips & Things Like Chemistry" was released as the album's third single. A music video was released for the song. Another double CD single was released later in the year, "Falling Out / Forward Motion". The latter song reached number three on the US Christian Rock Songs chart.

== Critical reception ==
Professional ratings
Review scores
| Source | Rating |
|---|---|
| AllMusic | 4.5/5 stars |
| Cross Rhythms | 9/10 squares |
| Jesus Freak Hideout | 4.5/5 stars |
| Melodic | 2/5 stars |

The album was met with positive reviews from music critics. Steve Losey of AllMusic praised the album who said it "may be the crossover vehicle that launches the band into the stratosphere," describing the record as "very strong." He said that the group establishes themselves as "the rulers of the punk kingdom," particularly noting that "'Forward Motion' is punk passion, where most bands would blow through this guitar-charged cut, Relient K pulls back the throttle, as a well-delivered piano brings the song to an eloquent close." Peter Ould of Cross Rhythms stated, "Special K? The Relients are serial thrillers and should be your breakfast listening this morning without fail."

John DiBiase of Jesus Freak Hideout complimented the "versatility of Relient's songwriting allows them to write hilarious tongue-in-cheek fun tunes like 'Mood Rings' while penning more serious worshipful ones like 'Getting Into You' and the renowned 'For the Moment I Feel Faint'." He also added that the album "is a step in the right direction for the RK boys and a worthy third chapter in their musical anthology." However, a negative review came from Kaj Roth of Melodic who stated, "It goes in one ear and out the other without any bigger reflection on how the music is" and told listeners to "spend your money on something else." Despite the negative review, he felt that the song "Falling Out" was "ok." A mixed review written by Daniel L. Mitchell of Ink 19 praised the group's "stellar" recording quality, remarking, "The guitars are crisp, driving and aggressive, as is the bass. The drums could be a bit louder, but they are still a force to reckoned with, as they pound and punch with real kick." Mitchell was much more critical on Thiessen's vocals describing it as "that terrible whiney voice style that the guitar player from Blink 182 and the fools in Sum 41 use." He also criticized the lyrics as "pointless blather that attempt to be ironic and funny, but fall short time after time."

The album was nominated for Best Rock Gospel Album at the 46th Annual Grammy Awards, but the award that year ended up being won by Worldwide by Audio Adrenaline. The album won a GMA Dove Award for Modern Rock Album of the Year.

== Commercial performance ==
Two Lefts Don't Make a Right...but Three Do debuted at number 38 on the Billboard 200, as well as number two on the US Top Christian Albums chart. It was certified Gold on March 21, 2005, by the RIAA for sales in excess of 500,000 units. As of 2007, the album has sold 518,000 copies in the United States.

== Track listing ==
All tracks are written by Matt Thiessen.

| No. | Title | Length |
|---|---|---|
| 1. | "Chap Stick, Chapped Lips, and Things Like Chemistry" | 3:10 |
| 2. | "Mood Rings" | 3:18 |
| 3. | "Falling Out" | 3:51 |
| 4. | "Forward Motion" | 3:57 |
| 5. | "In Love with the 80's (Pink Tux to the Prom)" | 3:08 |
| 6. | "College Kids" | 3:27 |
| 7. | "Trademark" | 3:54 |
| 8. | "Hoopes I Did It Again" | 3:12 |
| 9. | "Over Thinking" | 4:08 |
| 10. | "I Am Understood?" | 4:23 |
| 11. | "Getting Into You" | 3:24 |
| 12. | "Kids on the Street" | 0:26 |
| 13. | "Gibberish" | 1:45 |
| 14. | "From End to End" | 4:37 |
| 15. | "Jefferson Aero Plane" (includes hidden track "Silly Shoes") | 12:52 |
| Total length: | | 59:34 |

== Personnel ==
Credits adapted from album's liner notes.

Relient K

- Matt Thiessen – lead vocals, guitars, acoustic piano
- Matt Hoopes – guitars, backing vocals
- Brian Pittman – bass guitar
- Dave Douglas – drums, backing vocals, additional vocals (10)

Additional musicians

- DJ Manuel – programming (11)
- Rob Roy Fingerhead – occasional guitars, backing vocals
- Ryan Watts – additional vocals (4, 10, 14)
- Adam Grimm, Jake Gridgeway, and Ryan Nutter – "Kids on the Street" (12)

Production

- Joey Elwood – executive producer
- Toby McKeehan – executive producer
- Mark Lee Townsend – producer, recording
- Matt Thiessen – co-producer
- F. Reid Shippen – mixing at Recording Arts (Nashville, Tennessee)
- Dan Shike – mix assistant
- Randy LeRoy – mastering at Final Stage Mastering (Nashville, Tennessee)
- Grant Harrison – A&R
- Eddy Boer – creative direction
- Aaron Marrs – design, layout
- Todd Francis – cover illustration
- David Johnson – photography

== Charts ==
=== Weekly charts ===
Weekly chart performance for Two Lefts Don't Make a Right...but Three Do
| Chart (2003) | Peak position |
|---|---|
| US Billboard 200 | 38 |
| US Christian Albums (Billboard) | 2 |

=== Year-end charts ===
2003 year-end chart performance for Two Lefts Don't Make a Right...but Three Do
| Chart (2003) | Position |
|---|---|
| US Christian Albums (Billboard) | 17 |

2004 year-end chart performance for Two Lefts Don't Make a Right...but Three Do
| Chart (2004) | Position |
|---|---|
| US Christian Albums (Billboard) | 30 |

== Certifications ==
| Region | Certification | Certified units/sales |
|---|---|---|
| United States (RIAA) | Gold | 500,000^{^} |
^{^} Shipments figures based on certification alone.
