= Pressing On (Relient K song) =

Single by Relient K

from the album The Anatomy of the Tongue in Cheek
- Released: May 11, 2001
- Genre: Christian pop punk
- Length: 3:29
- Label: Gotee; Capitol
- Songwriter: Matt Thiessen
- Producer: Mark Lee Townsend

Relient K singles chronology
"Less is More" (2001)	"Pressing On" (2001)	"The Pirates Who Don't do Anything" (2002)

Music video
- "Pressing On" on YouTube

"Pressing On" is a song by the Christian rock band Relient K. It was released as the second single from their second studio album, The Anatomy of the Tongue in Cheek. The song was written by the band's lead singer Matt Thiessen.

== Background and composition ==
Following the release of their debut self-titled studio album, the group decided to show more growth and maturity in their songs from The Anatomy of the Tongue in Cheek, as heard on "Pressing On". The song is about growth in faith, while also making a reference to pop culture, where the last line of the song is from The Mary Tyler Moore Show theme.

"Pressing On" was written by Matt Thiessen and produced by Mark Lee Townsend. The song was mixed by J.R. McNeely at the Castle in Nashville, while Ted Jensen mastered the track at Sterling Sound in New York City.

An acoustic version appears on The Creepy EP, along with the studio version.

== Critical reception ==
Jesus Freak Hideout ranked the song at twentieth on their "Relient K's Top 20 Songs" list, writing, "Fast and loose punk rock with an ounce of maturity, this is a fun one that features a nice vocal breakdown to slow the pace before racing to its end."

== Use in media ==
The song was featured in the Power Rangers Ninja Storm episode "Looming Thunder", along with "Trademark" from Two Lefts Don't Make a Right...but Three Do. It also appears in Big Air Freestyle, a motocross video game for GameCube and can be heard on at least one episode of the television show Pimp My Ride. The song is featured in the episode of What's New, Scooby Doo? called "Gold Paw."

== Music video ==
A music video for "Pressing On" was released in 2001. The music video shows the at-the-time four band members as they walked from a van to a building where their video is to be shot. However, the band is instantly swamped by fans. Security guards desperately try to keep the fans away, but the band continues to look forward and walk towards the building anyway. Once they are inside, another fan who awaits them charges in their direction. Two more security guards take the man away as the band shows up on set. An extra scene is added at the end, where the director refers to their music as "Whatever you guys are playing these days". The music video also has many shots of the band performing the song, which are cut into the scenes of them walking through the fans.

The group was originally set to record a music video for another song, "Sade Hawkins Dance" in July 2001 and was supposed to feature Gary Coleman in the video. However, on a post to their official message board, Thiessen admitted that the band had to change to "Pressing On" at the last minute because of a low budget. Having only several days to plan the video, it was pulled together very quickly.

The video is also included on the gold edition of The Anatomy of the Tongue in Cheek.

== Track listing ==
CD single
No.	Title	Length
1.	"Pressing On" (radio edit)	3:11
2.	"Pressing On" (radio edit with fade)	2:44
3.	"Pressing On" (album version)	3:38
4.	"The Anatomy of the Tongue in Cheek" (sneak peek)	1:14

== Personnel ==
Credits for "Pressing On" adapted from album's liner notes.

Relient K

- Matt Thiessen – lead vocals, guitar
- Matt Hoopes – guitar, backing vocals
- Brian Pittman – bass
- Dave Douglas – drums, backing vocals

Additional musicians

- Rob Roy Fingerhead – nylon guitar, slide guitar
- Madalena Burle Marx – cello
- Ann Smith – viola
- Cory Smith – violin
- Heather Walker – violin
- Crystal Brezovsky – French horn

Production

- Mark Lee Townsend – producer
- J.R. McNeely – mixing
- Ted Jensen – mastering

== Charts ==
Chart performance for "Pressing On"
Chart (2001)	Peak position
US Christian Rock Songs (Radio and Records)	2
