= Hymns (Out of Eden album) =

Studio album by Out of Eden
- Released: March 29, 2005
- Recorded: 2005
- Genre: Hymns, rock, Gospel, R&B
- Label: Gotee
- Producer: Lisa Kimmey, Danielle Kimmey

Out of Eden chronology
| Love, Peace & Happiness (2004) | Hymns (2005) | Out of Eden: The Hits (2006) |

Professional ratings
Review scores
| Source | Rating |
|---|---|
| Cross Rhythms | 7/10 stars |
| Jesus Freak Hideout | 4/5 stars |

Hymns is the sixth album from Christian R&B/Urban, Pop group Out of Eden. It was released in March 2005.

== Track list ==
1. Fairest Lord Jesus (Barry Graul, Dave Wyatt, Lisa Kimmey, Munster Gesangbuch)
2. Immortal, Invisible, God Only Wise (Lisa Kimmey, Smith, Walter Chalmers)
3. I Know Whom I Have Believed (Whittle, Daniel S.)
4. Praise to the Lord, The Almighty (featuring Tree63) (Joachim Neander, Lisa Kimmey, Stralsund Gesahbuch)
5. My Faith Has Found a Resting Place (Edmunds, Lidie H., Lisa Kimmey)
6. God Will Take Care of You (Civilla D. Martin, Lisa Kimmey)
7. Vision of Love (Lisa Kimmey)
8. Have Mercy (Lisa Kimmey)
9. Be Still My Soul (Jean Sibelius, Katherine VonSchlegel, Lisa Kimmey)
10. Listen (Lisa Kimmey)
11. Better Is One Day (Prelude) (Lisa Kimmey)
12. Better Is One Day (Bryant Russell, Dee Dee Holt, Lisa Kimmey)
13. God Will (Reprise) (Civilla D. Martin, Lisa Kimmey)

== Personnel ==
- Bass – Bryant Russell
- Drums – Lemar Carter
- Guitar – Michael Ripoll
- Horns, Recorded By [Horns], Arranged By [Horns] – John Painter
- Keyboards, Piano [Rhodes] – Jammes "Jamba" Castro
- Mastered By – Randy Leroy
- Organ – Virgil Startford
- Percussion, Tambourine – Otto Price
- Producer, Vocals – Lisa Kimmey
- Recorded By [Strings] – Baeho Shin
- Strings, Arranged By [Strings] – The String Hookup
- Vocals – Andrea Baca, Danielle Kimmey
