= The Katinas =

Contemporary Christian music group

- Origin: American Samoa
- Genres: Contemporary Christian; gospel
- Label: Independent
- Website: thekatinas.com

The Katinas are a contemporary Christian music group. They are a family of five brothers. The group's members sang in Assembly of God church as children, and began playing fairs, soon moving up to nationwide slots opening for R. Kelly, Jasmine Guy, DC Talk, and Amy Grant.

The group was signed to Gotee Records and have released several albums on the imprint, including a 2006 retrospective entitled Collection. Shortly after their 2006 "Collection" Release, their contract with Gotee expired. It was not renewed, and they are no longer signed to a label. Their album "Still" was independently released in August 2008. They performed at UCLA in 2009 from June 30 – July 2 for the Fellowship of Christian Athletes, and played in the Harvest Crusade of 2008, 2009, and 2013.

Following the devastation of the 2009 Samoa earthquake and tsunami, the Katinas put on a benefit concert called "Hope for Samoa". It took place at the Fellowship Bible Church in Brentwood, Tennessee, just outside Nashville, on October 7. They perform at Bayside of south Sacramento every once in a while, bringing in a minimum of 600 people in Sacramento City College.

They performed their song, "So Good," at the 2012 Republican National Convention.

== Members ==
- Sam Katina – keyboard/vocals
- Joe Katina – drums/vocals
- James Katina – bass guitar/vocals
- John Katina – vocals
- Jesse Katina – vocals

== Discography ==
- 1991: Katina Boyz (Arcade Records)
- 1997: We Believe
- 1999: The Katinas (Gotee Records) (No. 16 Billboard Top Contemporary Christian, No. 21 Heatseekers)
- 2000: So Good (Maranatha! Music)
- 2001: Destiny (Gotee) (No. 23 Top Contemporary Christian, No. 45 Heatseekers)
- 2002: Lifestyle: A Worship Experience (Gotee) (No. 12 Contemporary Christian, No. 9 Heatseekers)
- 2003: Roots (Gotee)
- 2004: Family Christmas (Gotee)
- 2005: Timeless (Word Entertainment) (No. 24 Top Christian Albums, No. 43 Heatseekers)
- 2006: Collection (Gotee)
- 2006: My Samoa (Destiny Productions)
- 2008: Still (Destiny / Executive / Universal)
- 2009: Live at the Rock San Diego
- 2010: Sounds of Christmas (Destiny / Executive / Universal)
- 2011: Collage (Destiny)
- 2012: Love Chapter (Destiny)
- 2014: Sunday Set (Destiny)
- 2017: Peace, Love, Hallelujah - EP (Destiny)
- 2017: 19
- 2018: The Spirit of Christmas
- 2022: Sunday Set 2
- 2023: The Hymns

== Radio singles ==
- 1999: The Katinas
  - "One More Time"
  - "The Other Side"
  - "So Good"
  - "Takin' Me Higher"
  - "You Are God"
- 2001: Destiny
  - "Ain't No Love"
  - "It's Real"
  - "Thank You"
  - "You Are"
- 2000: Lifestyle
  - "Eagle's Wings"
  - "Rejoice"
- 2003: Roots
  - "Changed"
  - "Come Back to Love"
  - "Freedom"
- 2004: Family Christmas
  - "Joy to the World"
  - "Let It Snow! Let It Snow! Let It Snow!"
  - "Mary, Did You Know?"
  - "O Little Town of Bethlehem"
- 2005: Timeless
  - "One More Song for You"
  - "Shut De Do"
- 2008: Still
  - "Because"
  - "Praying for You"
- 2009: Live at the Rock San Diego
  - "Ancient Skies"
  - "Carry the Cross"
- 2010: Sounds of Christmas
  - "Silent Night"
- 2011: Collage
  - "Home"
  - "Collage"
- 2013: Love Chapter
  - "Cherish the Love"
- 2014: Sunday Set
  - "10,000 Reasons (Bless the Lord)"

== Appearances on other albums ==
- 1994: BeBe & CeCe Winans - Relationships; "Count It All Joy" (featuring The Katinas)
- 1996: Kenny Rogers The Gift; "Pretty Little Baby Child" (featuring The Katinas)
- 1996: Praising Him Island Style; "Praising Him Island Style", "Declare His Praises In The Islands" (David Katina & The Katinas)
- 1996: The Love He Gave Us: Christian Love Songs for Today's Christian Couple; "As Long As Our Heart Are In It", "Prayer of Love"
- 1998: Exodus; "Draw Me Close"
- 1999: Music For Film & Television Vol. I; "Mama"
- 1999: Gaither Homecoming - Kennedy Center Homecoming; "One More Time", "Mama"
- 1999: Godspell – Silver Anniversary Radio Celebration; "By Your Side" (Out of Eden & The Katinas)
- 1999: Out of Eden - No Turning Back; "Here's My Heart" (featuring The Katinas)
- 2000: 40 Presents Austin Live; "Lord I Lift Your Name on high", "Open the Eyes of my Heart", "Draw Me Close", "You Are God/Awesome God"
- 2002: Secrets Of The Vine: Music... A Worship Experience; "Wonderful To Me"
- 2003: WOW Worship: Yellow; "Draw Me Close" (from Exodus)
- 2003: The Good, The Bad and The Ugly: Video Vault; "It's Real"
- 2003: Sandtown – Based on a True Story; "Walk With Me" (featuring The Katinas)
- 2003: It Takes Two: 15 Collaborations & Duets; "Higher" (ZOEgirl & The Katinas)
- 2003: Worship Together - The Heart Of Worship; "Draw Me Close" (from Exodus)
- 2004: Gotee 10 Years Brand New; "Thank You"
- 2004: Absolute Worship; "Thank You" (from Lifestyle)
- 2004: Gaither Homecoming - Build A Bridge; "Thank You"
- 2005: Ron Winans Family And Friends, Vol. 5 A Celebration; "My Father's House"
- 2008: Quimi Alaniz - Quimi; "All For Love" (featuring The Katinas)
- 2009: RAWsesion; "Pocketful of Sunshine", "Praying For You", "Still"
- 2010: Worship For The Family: 35 Top Worship Songs; "Draw Me Close"
- 2010: The Cross: The Arthur Blessitt Story - Soundtrack; "Carry The Cross"
- 2011: Nicole C. Mullen - Captivated; "Lead Me"
- 2014: Gotee Records: Twenty Years Brand New; - "River"
- 2016: Heal the World; - "Heal the World", "Pierce the Darkness", We Can Change Tomorrow"

== Music videos ==
- 2001: "It's Real"
- 2003: "Still In Love"
- 2008: "Praying for You"
- 2009: "Carry the Cross"
- 2010: "Silent Night"
- 2010: "When It Rains"
- 2011: "Home"
- 2011: "Collage"
- 2012: "I'll Wait"
- 2013: "Cherish the Love"
- 2013: "All My Life"
- 2014: "10,000 Reasons (Bless the Lord)"
