= The Anatomy of the Tongue in Cheek =

Studio album by Relient K
- Released: August 28, 2001
- Studio: Yellow Studios (Canton, Ohio)
- Genre: Christian punk
- Length: 55:01
- Label: Gotee
- Producer: Mark Lee Townsend

Relient K chronology
The Creepy EP (2001)	The Anatomy of the Tongue in Cheek (2001)	Employee of the Month EP (2002)

Alternative cover
- The Gold Edition of the album, with the special gold slip cover

Singles from The Anatomy of the Tongue in Cheek
- 1. "Less Is More" Released: 2001; 2. "Pressing On" Released: 2001; 3. "For The Moments I Feel Faint / Those Words Are Not Enough" Released: 2002

The Anatomy of the Tongue in Cheek (often shortened to Anatomy) is the second full-length album released by Christian rock band Relient K. It was released on August 28, 2001, and peaked at No. 158 on the Billboard 200. On June 26, 2006, the album was certified Gold by the RIAA for sales in excess of 500,000 units in the United States. The cover of the original release is similar to that of the 1999 Ramones release Hey Ho! Let's Go: The Anthology.

== Background and release ==
The Anatomy of the Tongue in Cheek was produced and recorded by Mark Lee Townsend. The album was mixed by J.R. McNeely at the Castle in Nashville, while Ted Jensen mastered the album at Sterling Sound in New York City. It was the first album they recorded with drummer Dave Douglas, who replaced Stephen Cushman, after he left the band following the release of Relient K.

On the same day the group released the album, they released The Creepy EP, featuring two songs from the album and four exclusive tracks. "Less is More" was released as the album's lead single in 2001. It was followed up by the album's second single "Pressing On" released that same year. The group released the deluxe single "For The Moments I Feel Faint / Those Words Are Not Enough" in 2002. Gotee Records released a "Gold Edition" of the album on October 31, 2006, along with the release of a "Gold Edition" of Two Lefts Don't Make a Right...but Three Do on the same day. The Gold Edition of this album has remixed and remastered in a style similar to Mmhmm (the album was remixed by the same people who mixed Mmhmm) and it has a music video for the song "Pressing On".

The group toured in support of the album, playing nearly 200 shows in North America towards the end of 2001.

== Composition and lyrics ==
The album continues the band's liberal use of pop culture references as metaphors for Biblical principles (such as the song "I'm Lion-O," which is about the popular TV series Thundercats). Song themes range from pop culture to Christian themes—growth in faith ("Pressing On"), backsliding ("What Have You Been Doing Lately?"), worship ("Those Words Are Not Enough," "For the Moments I Feel Faint," and "Less Is More")—and social themes—such as racism and persecution ("Failure to Excommunicate"), judgementalism ("Down in Flames")—to making excuses or blaming others for one's own faults ("Maybe It's Maybeline"). There is also a song about one's experiences in high school ("Sadie Hawkins Dance").

The last line of "Pressing On" is from The Mary Tyler Moore Show theme. "Maybe It's Maybeline" (deliberately misspelled, much like the band's name) refers to the popular Maybelline line of beauty products and its tag line.

The group also showcases maturity and growth in their songwriting on the album. The album's sound is described as "tighter" and punk rock leaning.

== Critical reception ==
Professional ratings
Review scores
Source	Rating
AllMusic	4/5 stars
Cross Rhythms	7/10 squares
Jesus Freak Hideout	3.5/5 stars
Melodic	3.5/5 stars

The album was met with positive reviews from music critics. Ashleight Kittle of AllMusic stated, "the pop culture references in tracks including 'Sadie Hawkins Dance' and 'Maybe Its Maybeline' are quickly identifiable and immediately grasp the listener's attention. Definite highlights include the acoustic 'For the Moments I Feel Faint' and 'The Rest Is up to You'." Andy Long of Cross Rhythms felt that the album was a "major improvement" compared to their previous debut self-titled studio album and remarked, "the band have honed their sound into a tighter and meaner package and the production has a more punk rock edge [...] 'Those Words Are Not Enough' is certainly one of the album's musical high points."

John DiBiase of Jesus Freak Hideout called the album, "Not perfect, while still feeling just a little bit too youthful for some of the older crowd, but a leap above their debut, Relient K has created a sophomore album that is worth checking out by RK fans and non alike." Pär Winberg of Melodic praised the production on the album and said, "Add a superb lead vocalist in Matt Thiesen and great harmony vocals and you have an album to love."

The album has sold 300,000 copies in the United States.

== Track listing ==
All tracks are written by Matthew Thiessen, except "Those Words Are Not Enough", written by Matthew Hoopes.

Standard edition
No.	Title	Length
1.	"Kick-Off"	0:39
2.	"Pressing On"	3:29
3.	"Sadie Hawkins Dance"	3:07
4.	"Down in Flames"	4:07
5.	"Maybe It's Maybeline"	3:14
6.	"Breakdown"	3:45
7.	"Those Words Are Not Enough"	4:39
8.	"For the Moments I Feel Faint"	3:47
9.	"Lion Wilson"	0:36
10.	"I'm Lion-O"	2:55
11.	"What Have You Been Doing Lately?"	3:23
12.	"May the Horse Be with You"	2:17
13.	"My Way or the Highway..."	3:47
14.	"Breakfast at Timpani's"	0:22
15.	"The Rest Is Up to You"	4:04
16.	"Failure to Excommunicate"	3:35
17.	"Less Is More (Note: original version included "Skittles and Combos" as a hidden track; Gold edition included "The Ballad of Tim Eddings" as a hidden track. LP contains both tracks.)"	7:17
Total length:		54:53

The First Three Gears compilation album edition bonus tracks
No.	Title	Length
18.	"Operation"	2:33
19.	"Jefferson Airplane (Demo)"	3:57
20.	"Pressing On (Back Porch Acoustic)"	6:58

- Track 2 & 7, and all "First Three Gears" bonus tracks, originally from The Creepy EP.

== Credits and personnel ==
Credits adapted from album's liner notes.

Relient K

- Matt Thiessen – lead vocals, guitars, acoustic piano
- Matt Hoopes – guitars, backing vocals
- Brian Pittman – bass
- Dave Douglas – drums, backing vocals, additional vocals (16)

Additional personnel

- Rob Roy Fingerhead – nylon guitar, slide guitar
- Madalena Burle Marx – cello
- Ann Smith – viola
- Cory Smith – violin
- Heather Walker – violin
- Crystal Brezovsky – French horn
- Scott Cannon – gang vocals
- Kyle Hudson – gang vocals
- Kevan Peden – gang vocals

Production

- Joey Elwood – executive producer
- Toby McKeehan – executive producer
- Mark Lee Townsend – producer, recording
- F. Reid Shippen – mixing at The Castle (Nashville, Tennessee)
- Dan Shike – mix assistant
- Randy LeRoy – editing and assembling at Final Stage (Nashville, Tennessee)
- Ted Jensen – mastering at Sterling Sound (New York City, New York)
- Mike McGlaflin – A&R
- Aaron Marrs – creative design
- John Falls – photography
- Alabaster Arts – management

== Charts ==
Chart performance for The Anatomy of the Tongue in Cheek
Chart (2001)	Peak position
US Billboard 200	158
US Christian Albums (Billboard)	6

== Certifications ==
Region	Certification	Certified units/sales
United States (RIAA)	Gold	500,000^{^}
^{^} Shipments figures based on certification alone.
