= Zombiepowder. =

Japanese manga series written and illustrated by Tite Kubo

- First tankōbon volume cover, featuring Gamma Akutabi
- Genre: Adventure, fantasy, Western
- Manga
- Written by: Tite Kubo
- Published by: Shueisha
- English publisher: AUS: Madman Entertainment; NA: Viz Media
- Imprint: Jump Comics
- Magazine: Weekly Shōnen Jump
- Original run: August 2, 1999 – February 28, 2000
- Volumes: 4
- icon

Zombiepowder. (stylized in all caps) is a Japanese manga series written and illustrated by Tite Kubo. The manga ran in Shueisha's shōnen manga magazine Weekly Shōnen Jump for 27 chapters from August 1999 to February 2000 before being canceled. The series was collected into four tankōbon volumes, released the following year. Zombiepowder. is distributed in North America by Viz Media, who licensed it in 2005. Although critical reception in the United States was largely mediocre, the series achieved moderate commercial success in the western market due to the prominence Kubo had achieved by that point for his second manga series, Bleach.

Zombiepowder. follows a teenaged boy named Elwood Shepherd, who joins with mysterious criminals Gamma Akutabi and C.T. Smith in their search for the Rings of the Dead. These rings are a group of legendary artifacts with the power to resurrect the dead and grant immortality to anyone who collects 12 of them. The series has a Weird West setting which mixes a background of sparsely populated frontier settlements and gunslinger aesthetics with modern conveniences, occult magic, supernatural martial arts, and mad science. The trio travel from town to town in this world, fighting other criminals for possession of the Rings of the Dead. The protagonists obtain three of the rings in the course of the story, but due to the series' cancellation, the eventual success or failure of their quest is unknown.

The series was a commercial failure in Japan but has been successful in the United States. Critical consensus is that Zombiepowder. was a technically proficient manga, but one which lacked the originality necessary to bear intrinsic appeal to most readers, which accounted for its cancellation. Additionally, the series was heavily focused on battles even by the standards of action manga, though whether this was a positive or negative trait is a matter of contention. Due to these factors, combined with its abrupt and unsatisfactory ending, critics hold that Zombiepowder. is significant primarily as a chapter in the career of its author, and would otherwise be a footnote which found an audience only among fans of violent action.

== Setting and plot ==
Zombiepowder. is set within a western-themed environment with inconsistent levels of technology, similar to that found in Yasuhiro Nightow's manga series, Trigun. The most prominent characters in the series are Powder Hunters, individuals who seek the titular Zombie Powder, a life-giving substance that can imbue an individual with limitless life force, capable of granting immortality and even raising people back from the dead. Zombie Powder can only be obtained from the Rings of the Dead, dangerous magical artifacts that (individually) devour the vitality of anyone they touch, rendering them comatose; this stolen life energy is converted into the Zombie Powder, which can only be extracted if twelve Rings of the Dead are brought together.

The story begins with young pickpocket, John Elwood Shepherd befriending Powder Hunter, Gamma Akutabi after a botched attempt to rob him. It also turns out Gamma is a highly wanted fugitive in possession of a Ring of the Dead; because of this, when another member of the local gang Elwood is working sees them together, he assumes that Elwood's harboring him in hopes of turning him over for his bounty. The gang attacks Elwood's home, and Gamma comes to the rescue, but not before Elwood's sister, Sheryl, is killed by the gang's leader. Following the gang's assault, Elwood decides to accompany Gamma in his powder hunting in hopes of resurrecting Sheryl.

After leaving Elwood's hometown, the pair meet up with Gamma's long-time partner C.T. Smith, another Powder Hunter who's also wanted. Smith has infiltrated the ranks of Ash Daughter, a gang which has found a Ring of the Dead. The three challenge the gang's leader, Ranewater Calder, and Gamma slays him using his mastery of the fictional sword art karin zanjutsu, which involves the user channeling their own bloodlust and manifesting it as pyrokinesis. Elwood, Gamma, and Smith thereby gain a second Ring of the Dead, concluding the first arc and volume of the series.

The remaining three volumes concern themselves with the battle for a third ring, which has been embedded for years in the body of a comatose young man named Emilio Lufas Getto. Gamma and company learn of Emilio's existence from his sister, Wolfina, a tabloid photojournalist and vigilante who does not believe in the Rings of the Dead. The group of hunters offer to restore Emilio to consciousness in exchange for the ring he contains. Before they can do so, however, Emilio is kidnapped by Balmunk the Mystic, a powder hunting magician who leads a circus-themed gang. Wolfina teams up with Elwood, Gamma, and Smith to retrieve Emilio, and they succeed in doing so after a number of battles with Balmunk's henchmen. The conflict culminates in a fight between Gamma and a giant golem summoned by Balmunk, which Gamma defeats with the help of a berserk state. Balmunk is beaten but not killed, and departs whilst swearing revenge upon Gamma.

After rescuing Emilio, Gamma arranges to have the Ring of the Dead removed from his body by an old friend, mad scientist Nazna Gemini. The characters are brought to Gemini's lab by Angelle Cooney, a young girl with the power of teleportation. Once there, Gemini agrees to operate to remove the ring from Emilio in exchange for a year of experimentation rights on Wolfina.

Due to the series' early cancellation, Zombiepowder. is ended without a solid conclusion, the final chapter showing Gamma and Smith leaving Elwood and Wolfina behind as they depart the Gemini Laboratory, whose staff have just begun the operation to save Emilio. It is left ambiguous whether Elwood chooses to follow Gamma and Smith, stay with Wolfina and Emilio, or become a Powder Hunter in his own right.

== Characters ==
Gamma Akutabi (芥火 完真, Akutabi Ganma)
Gamma, the team leader and main combatant of Zombiepowder.'s cast, is a 22-year-old Powder Hunter who desires the Zombie Powder for the sake of immortality, and has already obtained one Ring of the Dead at his introduction in the first chapter. Due to numerous past violent crimes, Gamma is one of the most wanted criminals in the Zombiepowder. universe, with a bounty to match. This high bounty was one of the first things determined about Gamma's character by Tite Kubo, dating back to a pre-draft rendition of the character who was a sort of samurai. Gamma's personal history is never expounded upon, but it is implied by Balmunk that he was once a mercenary, but reformed and became a Powder Hunter following the death of a woman.
Throughout the series, Gamma bests his enemies using his superhuman strength and speed, a steel-plated right arm which allows him to catch bullets, and a large sword-chainsaw hybrid. Other abilities Gamma possesses are mastery of Karinzanjutsu (火輪斬術; lit., Fire-Ring Cutting Technique), a fictional ancient martial art which grants him a controllable aura called the "Black Flame of Death", and a berserk state Balmunk refers to as Gamma's "Black Monster." Neither of these elements is fully explained in the course of the story.
Theron Martin of Anime News Network considered Gamma to be a typical "bad-ass anti-hero", good at creating mayhem and not much else. IGN's review of the series treated him similarly, saying his role of "protagonist who wields a lot of power and hides a dark secret" was done effectively but not remarkably, and was typical of shōnen action manga. Alexander Gorban of the Russian Animemaniacs Magazine believed Gamma's typical nature as a hero with an inner demon was offset by the character's "devilish charm" and portrayed willingness to fight to the last breath to not lose his humanity. He noted that aspects of this personality were reused for Bleach protagonist Ichigo Kurosaki, who would also bear some similarities in physical appearance to Gamma. Gorban felt, however, that these same strengths of character made Gamma dominate the cast, and that Zombiepowder. would have been improved if he had simply been its sole protagonist.
John Elwood Shepherd (ジョン・エルウッド・シェパード, Jon Eruuddo Shepādo)
John Elwood Shepherd, referred to more commonly as Elwood, is a 13-year-old pickpocket who joins up with Powder Hunters Gamma and Smith in an effort to resurrect his dead sister, Sheryl Ann Shepherd. He is introduced in the first chapter of the series. His character is named after Gotee Records co-founder Joey Elwood, a real-life music producer whose name Kubo thought fit Elwood's character design perfectly. Elwood has great talent with throwing knives, and is ingenious in combat, but struggles to overcome his sidekick status and measure up to the abilities of his superhuman partners. Smith and Gamma both see Elwood as a younger version of Gamma, which fills Gamma with hope and pride, but also the fear that Elwood may turn to evil. This concern prompts Smith and Gamma to leave Elwood behind at Gemini Laboratory at the end of the manga, so that he can find his own way without Gamma's influence. Whether Elwood decides to follow the pair or not is left ambiguous.
Reviewers of Zombiepowder. found Elwood's character mostly unremarkable, due to his similarity to numerous other tag-along/protégé characters found in manga. Ed Chavez, reviewer for MangaCast said he grew "fond of" his character while he read, but that he suffered from sidelining by Gamma, while Den of Geek thought his motivation for seeking the zombie powder was an effective twist on the usual plot device of avenging a dead relative.
C.T. Smith (C. T. スミス, C.T. Sumisu)
C.T. Smith is introduced in the third chapter of Zombiepowder. as an apparent antagonist, a hired assassin working for the Ash Daughters gang. This is, however, a disguise, and Smith is actually Gamma's long-standing partner in powder hunting. Smith is the least developed member of the main cast, with little known backstory or motivation. It is implied that he is, like Gamma, an infamously dangerous criminal. Smith possesses superhuman speed and dexterity, is above-average at everything, and fights using handguns and an armored briefcase. He has no other known abilities but, according to the duo, Gamma and Smith are incapable of killing each other. Tite Kubo's character commentary for Smith in volume one states that Smith's appearance was based on a London banker, and notes that the "C.T." in his name was eventually meant to hold some plot significance.
Compared to his two fellow protagonists, C.T. Smith was considered more novel. Anime News Network said he was one of the few fresh points of the series and had the most distinctive design among the cast, though even his role as an unassuming businessman who's actually an expert gunman felt as if it must be borrowed from somewhere else. MangaCast's reviewer, on the other hand, found his role mostly extraneous, due to being overshadowed by Gamma. Animemaniacs Magazine Online noted that Smith's physical appearance was later echoed by Bleach's central antagonist, Sousuke Aizen.
Wolfgangina Lalla Getto (ウルフギャンギーナ・ララ・ジェット, Urufugyangīna Rara Jetto)
Wolfgangina Getto, nicknamed "Wolfina", is an 18-year-old paparazzi journalist who specializes in criminal exposé stories. Her brother, Emilio, hosts a Ring of the Dead that he found 8 years before the main storyline. The ring has been consuming his life force ever since, forcing him into a coma. Wolfina is introduced in the ninth chapter of the series, and joins up with the main characters soon after in order to protect her brother from Balmunk. She fights using a modified camera tripod she calls the "Tripod of Justice". At the end of the series, she agrees to work for Zanza Gemini for a year as an experimental subject in order to pay for the operation of removing the Ring of the Dead from Emilio. She is thus left behind by Gamma and Smith as they continue their powder hunting.
Critical reaction to Wolfina's character was limited, with reviewers contrasting her large-breasted character design to the otherwise lanky, shōjo manga-esque designs used in the series and praising her novel weapon choice.
Baragne Binoix Bartoreuil Balmunk (バラーニュ・ビノワ・バルトルイユ・バルムンク, Barānyu Binowa Barutoruiyu Barumunku)
Baragne Balmunk (referred to by his stage name "Balmunk the Mystic") is a sorcerer, Powder Hunter and serial killer nearly as wanted as Gamma. He gathers the Rings of the Dead solely for the excitement seeking them brings. Balmunk is introduced in the eleventh chapter, and takes the role of primary antagonist for the remainder of the series. Balmunk leads a gang made up of criminals with superpowers and weaponry based on traditional circus acts and freak show performances, such as fire swallowing and the box-impalement trick. His magical powers include summoning abilities which allow him to create weapons, call upon henchmen and beasts (such as tigers) and, with his most powerful technique, is able to create a giant golem named "Amantine" from one of his own limbs. Balmunk kidnaps Emilio in order to obtain the Ring of the Dead within him, but is defeated by Gamma. Balmunk holds a personal grudge towards Gamma, and knows about Gamma's berserker personality. The history behind their rivalry is never revealed, though he states that Gamma nearly killed him once before.
Balmunk and his circus troupe were received positively by reviewers, which considered the group a colorful and creepy opposing threat. A scene at the end of volume 2 in which Balmunk offers to return Emilio's body to Wolfina unharmed, but without his head, was cited by MangaCast as an eerie and effective character builder. Anime News Network said his character was a unique application of the circus villains trope that, while not original, is a rarity in Eastern comics, and rarely done so "outlandishly" even in the West. Alexander Gorban considered Balmunk the best-written character in the series, and his arc a "grand circus" of memorable scenes and battles thanks to his personal charisma and the author's resourcefulness in selecting powers for Balmunk and his troupe.

== Production and release ==
According to Tite Kubo, Zombiepowder. originated as an idea for a samurai manga which would have been titled "Samurai Drive." This initial conception of the story had very little in common with the end product, as it did not feature western elements or the titular zombie powder. It did star a version of Gamma, however, who still bore an over-sized sword and bounty, and featured scifi technologies. With respect to the premise of Zombiepowder., the author stated that the theme was fighting, and a world where the hope for resurrection lay not in god, but obtaining a mysterious substance. Tite Kubo did not comment on his influences for the series, but critic Theron Martin believed its tone, setting, and style drew heavily on the cyberpunk manga Battle Angel Alita, the dark fantasy manga Berserk, and fellow sci-fi/western manga Trigun, and A.E. Sparrow of IGN noted the obligatory genre influence of martial arts anime Dragon Ball Z. The series also borrows terminology from the music industry, referring to each chapter as a track, the bonus omake content in each volume as B-Sides, and naming primary character Elwood after a record label founder.

Zombiepowder. began serialization in Shueisha's Weekly Shōnen Jump on August 2, 1999, and ran a brief 27 chapters before being canceled on February 28, 2000. According to the author's commentary in the cover leaf of the third volume, Tite Kubo was in a state of severe emotional trauma when he wrote it, and only began to be happy with the quality of the series as it neared its ending. Speaking retrospectively 12 years later, Kubo stated that he was not yet used to the scheduling pressures of weekly serialization when he wrote Zombiepowder., and that at the time he paid too much attention to his editor's comments rather than trusting his own ideas. Other than Tite Kubo, Zombiepowder. had five credited staff, though their exact roles in its production were never specified.

The series was collected into four volumes, published in 2000 in Japan. Zombiepowder. was licensed for English distribution by Viz Media in 2005, following the success of Tite Kubo's second manga series, Bleach. The first English volume was released in the United States in September 2006, and the last was released in June 2007. A French-language edition began publication through Tonkam in 2013.

The Viz Media releases preserve the Japanese reading order and overlay the visual sound effects with equivalent English text. The English lettering was criticized for being overly large, which Anime News Network thought made the characters appear to be shouting at inappropriate moments. There are several additional differences between the Japanese and English volume releases of Zombiepowder.. The cover of the second manga volume, which featured an illustration of C.T. Smith holding a gun to his own head, was replaced in the English edition with new art of Gamma in sunglasses. The English editions of volumes 2–4 also each contain a one-shot story from early in Kubo's career, which were not present in the Japanese collections: Ultra Unholy Hearted Machine, Rune Master Urara, and Bad Shield United, respectively. These extra stories were included for two apparent reasons: to further appeal to Zombiepowder.'s primary English-speaking audience of Bleach fans interested in the development of Tite Kubo's style, and to expand the length of the later volumes, which would otherwise have been shorter than Viz's normal releases, to standard pagecounts.

== Chapters ==
No.	Title	Original release date	English release date
1	The Man With the Black Hand	February 2, 2000; 4-08-872828-9	September 5, 2006; 978-1-4215-0152-9
01. "The Young Boy and the Black Right Arm"; 02. "Baptism of Fire"; 03. "Smith"; 04. "Shakin' Edges & Smokin' Barrels"; 05. "Face Behind the Mask"; 06. "Deceiving Jet Joe"; 07. "Blackfired"
2	Can't Kiss the Ring (of the Dead)	April 4, 2000; 4-08-872852-1	December 5, 2006; 978-1-4215-0153-6
08. "Search & Bangaway"; 09. "Tripod of Justice"; 10. "Wolfina (Has No Lips To Tell You)"; 11. "Rocker & Mystic"; 12. "Ring of the Dead (My Love Will Eat You Up)"; 13. "The Evergreen Birdcage"; 14. "Killer Circus"; Bonus Story: "Ultra Unholy Hearted Machine"
3	Pierce Me Standing in the Firegarden	June 2, 2000; 4-08-872877-7	March 6, 2007; 978-1-4215-1121-4
15. "Divisions"; 16. "Flamediver"; 17. "The Hyenas Are Calling (Craze & Trigger Happy)"; 18. "The Evergreen Birdcage (Append Selfdemonizer Mix)"; 19. "Excoriated the Black Butterfly"; 20. "Can't Howl My Innerjesus"; 21. "No Hesitate, No Fear"; Special Short Story: "Rune Master Urara"
4	Walk Like a Zombie	August 4, 2000; 4-08-872897-1	June 5, 2007; 978-1-4215-1122-1
22. "Lay Your Heart on Me"; 23. "Cagebreaker 3"; 24. "But Still Livin' Under the Sky"; "Zombiepowdersnow."; 25. "Badfinger/Bitchangel"; 26. "Believe"; "Track for Cut Down/The Nameless Way"; Special Short Story: "Bad Shield United"; Zombiepowderextra./"Sleeping With Vertigo."

== Reception ==
Zombiepowder.'s battle scenes are typified by their graphic violence, minimal use of backgrounds, and quick angle changes between panels, all of which can be seen here.

Zombiepowder. sold modestly in Japan, but has been commercially successful in the United States. The second volume placed in the top 100 graphic novels for Christmas 2006. Theron Martin of Anime News Network believed the series could have achieved some success in the United States without the Bleach connection due to the American market's larger appetite for series which focus on violent action, but that the series was heavily buoyed by Bleach's international popularity, and primarily imported for an audience of "Kubo completists [sic]."

Critical reception of Zombiepowder. as a whole mostly deemed it mediocre and average. Two reviews from Anime News Network ranked it as a C, it received a C+ review from MangaCast, a Den of Geek review gave it 3/5 stars, and an IGN review concluded it was "no better or worse that [sic] many other shōnen titles" with "not much to separate it from the massive stock of shōnen series that are similar to it." Jason Thompson included it in a list of "mediocre" shōnen action titles whose clichéd nature and "ripped-off" character designs left them interesting only to readers unacquainted with the tropes of the genre. The universal criticism in these reviews is that the series as a whole lacks originality, with most mentioning that it reads very much like the author's first effort it is, and would therefore appeal mostly to fans of the author. While he echoed most individual criticisms of the English-language reviewers, a divergent conclusion was reached by Russian critic Alexander Gorban of Animemaniacs Magazine Online, who believes that Zombiepowder.'s fundamentals were all strong, and that the failure of the series in Japan was instead due to Tite Kubo's overreach in publishing a series in the highly-competitive Weekly Shōnen Jump at such a young age. Had the freshman author been serialized in a less prominent magazine, asserts Gorban, Zombiepowder. would have been allowed longer to establish itself and could have developed into a series at least as good as Bleach.

Reception for individual elements of Zombiepowder. was more mixed. The series premise of seeking magical items was criticized as cliche by ANN and IGN, but deemed sufficient for the needs of the story by AMO, and the parasitic nature of the rings and zombie powder themselves were complimented by MangaCast and IGN for lending suspense to the plot. The setting was criticized by ANN and Gorban alike for not having much effort put into it, being too similar to Trigun, and seeming to be chosen just for the sake of coolness, while IGN liked the mixture of the old west, arcane, and technological. The quality of individual characters in the series was again considered a mixed bag, both in artistic design and characterization, but with a consensus across reviews that the characters were not developed much beyond their respective tropes.

Of all the elements of the series, Zombiepowder.'s action sequences received the most feedback. The battle scenes were criticized for their unsophisticated art by Anime News Network, with rough drawings and few backgrounds, though in its second review ANN noted a guiding philosophy to the background omission: elements of the scene which were not props in the fight faded out whenever action began. ANN also said that the action was entertainingly violent, kinetic, well-paced, easy to follow, and interspersed well with comedic moments. They ultimately concluded the action was handled better than average, but with the disclaimer that the action was "the entire sum and substance" of the series. IGN opened their review with a Tite Kubo quote from the first volume's flap: "The theme is fighting. Sitting there and just reading it without thinking is fine. But if you ever feel like it please try to use your mind as you read," and said that if this advice was taken Zombiepowder. could be a "great shōnen tale", but that without it the story was only enjoyable by dissection and comparison to other series. Gorban's view was again the most positive, stating that the essential trait of a memorable fight scene is to pit two charismatic figures with contrasting personalities and combat styles against each other, and that the series grasped this notion admirably. Finally, Den of Geek found Zombiepowder.'s "wall-to-wall" action sequences colorful and fun, but complained that the sheer mass of them overwhelmed the rest of the story.
