= Pressing On =

Pressing On may refer to:

- "Pressing On" (Relient K song)
- "Pressing On" (Bob Dylan song)
