= Zombie powder =

Zombie Powder, zombie powder, or zombiepowder may refer to:

- Zombiepowder., a cancelled 1999 manga series by Tite Kubo
- Tetrodotoxin, a poison allegedly used by practitioners of certain Afro-American religions to paralyse a person
