= We're All Going Somewhere =

EP by Abandon Kansas
- Released: September 8, 2009
- Recorded: 2009
- Genre: Christian rock, Christian pop
- Length: 22:50
- Label: Gotee

Abandon Kansas chronology
| The Earth Falls Asleep (Acoustic EP) (2008) | We're All Going Somewhere (2009) | Abandon Kansas EP (2011) |

Professional ratings
Review scores
| Source | Rating |
|---|---|
| AbsolutePunk | (83%) |
| Indie Vision Music | 8/10 stars |
| Jesus Freak Hideout | 3.5/5 stars |

We're All Going Somewhere is the fifth studio EP by the American Christian rock band Abandon Kansas. It is the first EP on Gotee Records.

== Track listing ==
| No. | Title | Length |
|---|---|---|
| 1. | "The Harder They Fall" | 3:50 |
| 2. | "I Wonder If It's Me" | 3:28 |
| 3. | "Make Believe" | 3:58 |
| 4. | "We're All Going Somewhere" | 4:00 |
| 5. | "Months and Years" | 3:42 |
| 6. | "Close Your Eyes" | 3:54 |
