= Lovin' the Day =

Studio album by Out of Eden
- Released: March 22, 1994
- Genre: R&B; Urban contemporary gospel Pop
- Length: 49:54
- Label: Gotee Records

Out of Eden chronology
| No previous albums | Lovin' the Day (1994) | More Than You Know (1996) |

Lovin' the Day is the debut album of the Dove Award-winning American urban gospel group Out of Eden, released in 1994. It features sisters Lisa, Andrea, and Danielle Kimmey. It was the launch album of Gotee Records, and served as the catalyst for the creation of the record label; founders of the label Toby McKeehan, Todd Collins, and Joey Elwood had wanted to produce the album, but after not being able to find a Record label to sign the act to, they formed Gotee Records and began distributing the band's material on their own. The album peaked at #10 on the Top Contemporary Christian music chart. It includes a cover of the Bill Withers hit Lovely Day.

== Track listing ==
There are 14 songs on the album. It is 49 minutes and 54 seconds long.

| Track # | Title | Time | Composer |
|---|---|---|---|
| 1 | Lovely Day | 4:51 | Scarborough, Withers |
| 2 | Come and Take My Hand | 3:52 | Collins, Elwood, Henderson, Kimmey, McKeehan |
| 3 | Show Me | 3:44 | Tait, Wilshire |
| 4 | 3 Bro's w/ No Fro's (Interlude) | 1:20 | |
| 5 | Good Thing | 3:51 | Collins, Elwood, Kimmey, McKeehan, Painter |
| 6 | Gotee's Groovin' | 4:47 | Carter, Collins, Henderson, Jones, Kimmey |
| 7 | Bandwagon | 4:17 | Collins, Elwood, Kimmey, McKeehan |
| 8 | There Is a Love | 5:12 | Collins, Henderson, Kimmey, McKeehan |
| 9 | Joy (Interlude) | 1:00 | |
| 10 | Heart of Hearts | 3:37 | Kimmey, Penix |
| 11 | A Friend | 4:02 | Collins, Williamson |
| 12 | Force Like This | 3:49 | Collins, Kimmey, Painter |
| 13 | Lovely Vibe (Interlude) | 1:27 | |
| 14 | Gotee's Groovin' (Drumapella) | 4:05 | |

== Personnel ==
| Name | Credits |
|---|---|
| Joe Baldridge | Engineer, Mixing |
| Al Gaines | Engineer |
| The Gotee Brothers | Arranger, Programming, Producer, Vocal Arrangement, Mixing |
| David Hall | Engineer, Mixing |
| Mark Heimermann | Vocals (background) |
| Mo Henderson | Keyboards |
| John Jaszcz | Mixing |
| Randy LeRoy | Editing |
| Toby McKeehan | Engineer |
| John Painter | Bass, Guitar, Horn, Overdubs, Mixing |
| Otto Price | Bass |
| Rick Robbins | DJ |
| Darren Smith | Mixing Assistant |
| Kerri McKeehan Stuart | Artwork, Photography |
| Chris Vance | Design, Layout Design |
| Reid Waltz | Engineer, Production Coordination |
| Howie Weinberg | Mastering |
| Scott Williamson | Arranger, Drums, Programming |
