= The Gotee Brothers =

The Gotee Brothers was a Contemporary Christian music trio formed of the three founders of the Gotee Records label: Toby McKeehan (tobyMac), Joey Elwood, and Todd Collins. The trio only released one album in 1997, "ERACE", and its contents dealt with racial issues. The album won Hip Hop Album of the year at the 28th GMA Dove Awards.

== Discography ==
=== Albums ===
- ERACE (1997)

== Awards ==
=== Doves ===
- 1997: Hip Hop Album of the Year (ERACE)
