= Liquid (rapper) =

American rapper

- Born: Victor Manuel Oquendo; July 10, 1979 (age 47); Philadelphia, Pennsylvania, U.S.
- Origin: Nashville, Tennessee, U.S.
- Genres: Christian hip hop, gospel, R&B
- Occupations: Singer, songwriter
- Years active: 2005–present
- Label: Gotee

Victor Manuel Oquendo (born July 10, 1979), who goes by the stage name Liquid, is an American Christian hip hop musician and Christian R&B recording artist. His only album, Tales from the Badlands, was released by Gotee Records in 2005.

== Biography ==
Liquid was born Victor Manuel Oquendo, on July 10, 1979, in Philadelphia, Pennsylvania. He started rapping in the 1990s, when he came up with the stage name Liquid.

His music recording career commenced in 2005, with the album, Tales from the Badlands, and it was released by Gotee Records on December 26, 2005, with a re-release on July 18, 2006. The album was reviewed by CCM Magazine, Christianity Today, Cross Rhythms, Jesus Freak Hideout, and The Phantom Tollbooth.

He met his wife, in Los Angeles, California, whose Bridget Oquendo, and together they reside in Nashville, Tennessee.

== Discography ==
Studio albums

- Tales from the Badlands (released, December 26, 2005, re-released, July 18, 2006, Gotee)
