= Finding Favour =

- Origin: Lyons, Georgia, U.S.
- Genres: Contemporary Christian music, contemporary worship music,
- Years active: 2005–present
- Labels: Gotee
- Members: Blake NeeSmith; Allen Dukes; Dustin Daniels; Josh Duckworth
- Past members: Ricky Dunn; Nathan Tomberlin; Aaron Tomberlin
- Website: findingfavour.com (broken link)

Finding Favour is a contemporary Christian music band from Vidalia, Georgia. They are on the Gotee Records label, and released their first studio EP entitled Finding Favour EP on March 12, 2013. The EP has achieved positive critical reception. In addition, the EPs two lead singles have seen commercial and radio airplay successes.

== Background ==
In 2005, Finding Favour was formed in Vidalia, Georgia and it consisted of Blake NeeSmith, Allen Dukes, Dustin Daniels, and Ricky Dunn. Nathan Tomberlin joined the band in 2008. Dunn resigned later that year and was replaced by Aaron Tomberlin. Nathan and Aaron resigned in 2012 and soon after Joshua Duckworth joined the band.

== Music ==
In 2012, the band was signed to Gotee Records.

Finding Favour EP

On March 12, 2013, Finding Favour released their eponymously named Finding Favour EP. Finding Favour EP had two singles released from the EP, which were "Slip On By" that charted at a peak of No. 22 on the Billboard Christian Songs chart and "Shake the World" that peaked at No. 27 on the same chart.

Reborn

The band released Reborn as their first studio album, on June 23, 2015 with Gotee Records.

== Members ==
Current

- Blake NeeSmith – vocals
- Allen Stanford Dukes – guitar
- Joseph Dustin Daniels – bass guitar
- Joshua Duckworth – drums

Former

- Danny Richard Dunn – vocals, lead guitar
- Nathan Tomberlin - Drums
- Aaron Tomberlin - Guitar, Keys,

== Discography ==
=== Studio albums ===
List of studio albums, with selected chart positions
| Title | Album details | Peak chart positions | |
| Title | Album details | US Christ | US Heat |
|---|---|---|---|
| Reborn | Released: June 23, 2015; Label: Gotee; CD, digital download | 2 | – |
| Farewell Fear | Released: August 25, 2017; Label: Gotee; CD, digital download | – | – |

=== Singles ===
| Year | Single | Peak Chart Positions | | Album |
| Year | Single | US Christian | Christian Airplay | Album |
|---|---|---|---|---|
| 2015 | "Cast My Cares" | 15 | 10 | Reborn |
| 2016 | "Refuge" | 25 | 16 | Reborn |
| 2016 | "Be Like You" | 45 | 26 | Reborn |
| 2017 | ”It Is Well" | - | 37 | Farewell Fear |
| 2017 | ”Get Down" | - | 38 | Farewell Fear |
