= Andy Zipf =

American singer-songwriter

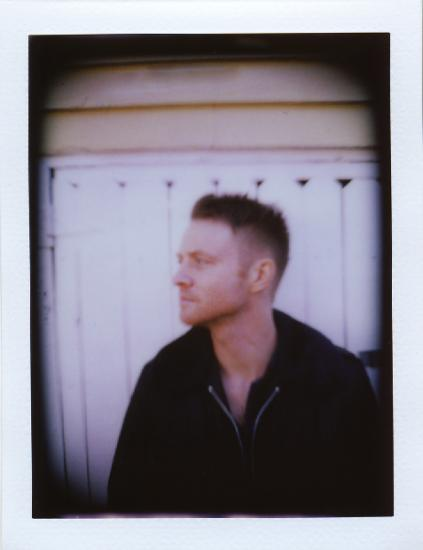
- Andy Zipf in 2012

Background information
- Origin: Northern Virginia, U.S.
- Genres: Indie rock, folk, soul
- Years active: 2002-present
- Labels: KO!M, Mono Vs. Stereo, P Is For Panda
- Website: andyzipf.com

Andy Zipf (pronounced ZIFF) is a singer/songwriter from Indianapolis, Indiana, currently living in Greenville, South Carolina. He has shared the stage with artists like Joshua Radin, Delta Spirit, Evan Dando, Jeremy Enigk, David Bazan, The Lone Bellow, Old Sea Brigade and Bill Mallonee.

== History ==
Zipf was among the first to call for a shift away from traditional music marketing business models, giving away much of his music for free. Before Kickstarter became mainstream, in 2005 Zipf funded his first tour solely off the $2 donations of his fans. In 2006, he and manager Shawn Matthews raised more than $45,000 from his fans to produce The Long Tail EP. In 2009, he released The Cowards Choir using a "pay as you can" model from his website. These music and marketing techniques caught the attention of Paste Magazine, Performing Songwriter Magazine, American Songwriter, XM Satellite Radio, and CMJ music festival. Zipf has had songs played on VH1 and MTV, and "Stumble on the Line" was featured on ABC's Private Practice.

In 2008, Zipf embarked on a project and tour combining music and film in a constantly changing live performance art piece known as "Pfriends on Pfilm". Performing in all white, Zipf and his band played in front of a white canvas while thematic colors and found film were projected onto their bodies by artist Brad Wolf.

In October 2009, Zipf signed to P Is For Panda and wrote and recorded with The Lost Chorus, a band composed of former members of Stavesacre and Project 86.

"Jealous Hands" was Zipf's first album on P Is For Panda/Hopeless. It was produced by Jeremy SH Griffith and digitally released on July 5, 2011. He also offered it as a free 192 kbits download on his website.

In 2013 Zipf took the moniker The Cowards Choir and released the 4 song EP Reunion through NoiseTrade. Shortly thereafter, Zipf recruited drummer Adam Neubauer, percussionist Ben Tufts and bassist/keyboardist Ryan Walker to fill out The Cowards Choir band.

In October 2014, The Cowards Choir released the 4 song EP Cool Currency, also through NoiseTrade.

After the Ben Tufts & Friends benefit show for the Craig Tufts Memorial Fund at Vienna, VA's Jammin' Java in August 2015, Ben Tufts and Adam Neubauer parted amicably from the band. Continuing to play with Ryan Walker, Zipf welcomed Alissa Moore and Dayana Yochim into the band.

In 2016, the new lineup released the album "Name The Fear", in addition to a collaborative visual score by Charlotte, NC filmmaker Will Davis (Small Creatures).

During the pandemic, Zipf wrote "There Is No Virus On the Moon" and shot the video in his apartment, which PASTE Magazine premiered on May 19, 2020.

In 2022, Zipf released "How to Make A Paper Airplane" Produced by Matt Williams, it features Jay Bellerose (Robert Plant, Alison Krauss), Jennifer Condos (Ray LaMontagne, Joe Henry), Dennis Crouch (Emmylou Harris, John Fogerty) and Tyler Chester (Madison Cunningham, Andrew Bird). Atwood Magazine called the album, "poignant and moving". Analogue described it as a "resonant album with beautiful musical flourishes". "How to Make A Paper Airplane" was nominated as a top 15 finalist in the American Songwriter's 2022 September/October Lyric Contest.

== Charity ==
In 2010, Zipf toured nationwide with Damion Suomi and Lauris Vidal in support of the TWLOHA Spring 2010 UChapters Tour, "Evenings of Lyrics and Conversation".

== Discography ==
=== Andy Zipf ===
- I Stole The Morning Sun (Gotee Records, 2004)
- Are We Going Down deluxe single (2005)
- The Long Tail EP (2007)
- Lay it Down EP (2008)
- The Cowards Choir EP (2009)
- The Long Tail (2009)
- Our Voice is a Weapon EP (2009)
- Travelers Psalms and Carols EP (2009)
- Jealous Hands (P is for Panda/Hopeless Records, 2011)
- There Is No Virus On the Moon single (2020)
- How to Make A Paper Airplane (2022)

=== The Cowards Choir ===
- Reunion EP (2013)
- Cool Currency EP (2014)
- Name The Fear (2016)
- The Singing Tree, live single (2017)
- I Took A Drive, live single (2017)
