= Damion Suomi =

American singer-songwriter

- Origin: Cocoa Beach, FL United States
- Genres: Indie Rock; Folk; Drinking Songs
- Years active: 2007 - present
- Label: P Is for Panda/Hopeless Records
- Members: Damion Suomi
- Website: www.damionsuomi.com

Damion Suomi is an American singer-songwriter and guitarist. He currently resides in Cocoa Beach, Florida.

== Music career ==
Suomi began singing in church as a child and later took up the guitar after his parents' divorce as a means to feel more connected to his father, who also played guitar. Suomi attended Bible college for a year before choosing to take a new direction with his life: "They give the students this great experience, but then I realized later that I was having the same experiences at concerts and bars, where there's this collective conscious, you're surrounded by the people you love, everyone's singing songs, and something just clicks. It's completely the same feeling."

Beginning songwriting in his early twenties, Suomi played with Dame before moving to Ireland for a year and a half. He returned home to Florida with a catalog of Irish rebel and drinking songs, which he would later perform at local Irish pubs. Following this, Suomi found regional success with pop band Memoranda but left shortly thereafter to pursue music closer to his own heart. Suomi set out on a solo career, with his debut album Self Titled ("a straight-ahead look at disillusionment and the walls people put up to avoid pain") being released in early 2009, following with the EP Needs a Little Water ("brief, by most recording standards, but a lion nonetheless") in December of that year, both released by Atlanta-based record label P Is for Panda, an affiliate of Hopeless Records.

Touring tirelessly since November 2009 with Andy Zipf and Lauris Vidal, Suomi rejoined former Memoranda bandmates Ian and Gavin Little, Zac Sullivan, and along with David Fountain, in January 2010 to resume touring as Damion Suomi and the Minor Prophets. Suomi and band appeared at the 2010 SXSW music festival, garnering a spot on Esquire Magazine's "Great New Songs from SXSW... in a Sentence Each" list.

The poster for Suomi's Self Titled can be seen in Fox's Sons of Tucson.

== Charity ==
Aside from P is for Panda proceeds, one third of which are donated to various charities, Suomi frequently shares his time, his profits, and his story to support TWLOHA (To Write Love on Her Arms), "a non-profit movement dedicated to presenting hope and finding help for people struggling with depression, addiction, self-injury and suicide."

== Personal life ==
Suomi is of Finnish descent.

== Discography ==
=== Albums ===
- Self Titled (2008) self-released, (2009) P Is for Panda
- Go, and Sell All of Your Things (2011) Hopeless Records

=== EPs ===
- Needs a Little Water (December 2009) P is for Panda
