= Miss Angie =

American singer

- Born: Angie Turner; 1977 (age 48–49)
- Genre: Contemporary Christian music
- Years active: 1997–2000, 2008–present
- Labels: Myrrh, Transform
- Website: missangieworship.com

Angie Turner (born 1977), known professionally as Miss Angie, is a Christian music artist. She released two albums on Myrrh Records, 100 Million Eyeballs in 1997 and Triumphantine in 1999. Her music was grounded in aggressive hard rock and pop sound with a feel that was described as "retro-eclectic", and vocals likened to those of Cyndi Lauper. Her portrayed image, one of the strong female rock star, was unusual in Christian music, but was offset by overtly Christian lyrics.

She signed with the Transform Music Group and released a new album, Time & Space, on July 26, 2011.

The name Miss Angie was a compromise; at the time of recording her first album she knew that she was getting married, and so chose a name that was neutral with regard to that event.

She is the sister of Shawn Turner, former guitarist for Johnny Q. Public. The family had a background in Christian music ministry, and the siblings had grown up traveling with their father's Christian rock bands in a situation she later described as being "sort of like The Partridge Family." She married Oran Thornton, also from Johnny Q. Public, in 1998. Oran went on to join the band Flick. They are divorced. In a 2012 interview Miss Angie references her new husband Dave Darr who co-produced her single 'Restore'.

On June 14, 2011, Miss Angie released a single off her tentative release with Transform Music Group called "Kick Drum". On April 10, 2012 she released a new single, "Restore", accompanied with a music video.

== Background ==
Miss Angie began her solo career doing praise and worship sets after Johnny Q. Public concerts. She started writing songs at the age of 16, and while on tour Oran Thornton encouraged her make a career out of music. These efforts eventually lead to a demo produced with David Zaffiro and a contract with Myrrh Records.

Her lyrics were influenced by artists whom she describes as being "out-front praising Jesus and plainly talking about the Word." She names the influence of as Keith Green, Crystal Lewis, and Second Chapter of Acts. Her debut contains a cover of the latter's "Which Way the Wind Blows".

100 Million Eyeballs, released in 1997, takes its name from a creature described in the prophetic books of Revelation and Isaiah. Its lyrics have a simple though thought-provoking structure, aimed at the junior-high market. Several reviewers found that its songs tend to pose questions to the listener, but end up coming off as praise music. Musically, the album centered around "big guitars, heavy beats," and a "warm yet still girlish, voice."

Overall, Miss Angie portrayed the image of a "polished, yet glaring 'teenie-bopper'," a sentiment that others reflected as well. More than one critic expressed the thought that the portrayal of the strong female lead rocker was unusual in Christian music, and this probably enhanced the albums appeal. The dichotomy between the sweet and the aggressive images are what made the album worth listening to.

On Triumphantine the band's sound changed considerably, dropping the emphasis on guitar in favor of keyboard synthesizers. One reviewer described the sound as Fleming and John meets His Name Is Alive. Another likened it to pre-comeback Blondie or Plumb, and a third to The Doors. The overall effect was that the album contained a greater variety of sounds than the debut. One major complaint was the short length of the album as well as the individual tracks, which one commented didn't allow the songs to fully develop musically.

During 2012 and 2013 Miss Angie began releasing a series of singles and an independently released EP, The Casting Down of Demonic Angels.

On April 24, 2019 Miss Angie posted a video announcing she will be recording an album with music producer Gabriel Wilson.

== Discography ==
- 1997: 100 Million Eyeballs
- 1999: Triumphantine
- 2011: Kick Drum - Single
- 2011: Time and Space
- 2012: Restore - Single
- 2013: Stay Afloat - Single
- 2013: The Casting Down of Demonic Angels - EP
- 2020: Desert Flags - EP
