= Johnny Q. Public =

American band

- Origin: Springfield, Missouri
- Genres: Christian rock; alternative rock; grunge; pop rock
- Years active: 1994–2001, 2015 (one-off reunion), 2024–2025 (Bono Fritz Tribute)
- Labels: Gotee, Roadrunner
- Past members: Dan Fritz; Bono Fritz; Oran Thornton; Shawn Turner; Ken Bassham; Brian Duvall; Brad Barnerd; Shawn Brock; Nathan McCorkle; Eminence Bessette; Victor Ashton; Ace Powders; Jayson Cook

Johnny Q. Public (sometimes stylized as johnny Q. public) was a Christian rock band from Springfield, Missouri that formed in 1994. Although their sound was wholly modern, it was influenced by bands such as Led Zeppelin and Cream. In 2024, the band was briefly revived for a tribute tour to the lead singer Dan Fritz by his son Bono. In addition to their music, they were known for their charismatic theology, which they would dramatically display through audience participation at their live shows.

== History ==
When Johnny Q. Public signed to Gotee Records, its members were between the ages of fifteen and twenty-three. Their signing came after producing a single "Black Ice" produced and mixed by Joe Baldridge. The band's debut studio album, Extra*Ordinary, was released in 1995 and garnered the band mainstream distribution through Elektra Records. Vocalist Dan Fritz later referred to the period after releasing Extra*Ordinary as being a "whirlwind of craziness". Their single "Body Be" gained the band national exposure when its music video, directed by Steven L. Weaver, was picked up by MTV. The music video was later included on the Gotee Records video compilation The Good, the Bad, & the Ugly: Video Vault in 2003 while the song was included on the Gotee: 10 Years Brand New compilation in 2004. Extra*Ordinary sold close to 50,000 copies.

Johnny Q. Public toured for three years before being able to pursue a second album, and during that time the band experienced some personnel changes. Around 1998, guitarist Oran Thornton married Christian artist Miss Angie, sister of guitarist Shawn Turner, and moved on to a band called Flick. Drummer Brian Duvall also left and was replaced by Nathan McCorkle, former drummer for Morella's Forest.

Johnny Q. Public's second studio album, Welcome to Earth, was released through both Gotee and Roadrunner Records. The album was released on September 26, 2000 and its sound shifted toward pop with hints of hard rock. HM magazine likened it to the Newsboys, stating that the band could easily receive radio play in both Christian and mainstream markets. In support, they toured with Bleach and Skillet. The song "Move" was released as a single.

Johnny Q. Public disbanded in mid-2001. Lead singer Dan Fritz died suddenly on September 26, 2024 in Springfield, MO. He was 53.

== 2015 Reunion Concert ==
Johnny Q. Public had a one-time reunion concert at Cartoons Oyster Bar in Springfield, Missouri on May 22, 2015; the show incorporated all the rotating touring members and line-up changes.

== Discography ==
Johnny Q. Public discography
- Studio albums: 2
- Singles: 2
- Music videos: 1

Studio albums

- Extra*Ordinary (1995)
- Welcome to Earth (2000)

Singles

- "Body Be" (1995)
- "Move" (2000)

Music videos

- "Body Be" (Extra*Ordinary, 1995)

== Members ==
- Dan Fritz – vocals (1994-2001)
- Bono Fritz – vocals (2024-2025)
- Oran Thornton – guitar (1994-1996)
- Shawn Turner – guitar (1994-2001)
- Ken Bassham – bass (1994-1996)
- Brian Duvall – drums (1994-1998)
- Brad Barnerd – guitar (1996-2000)
- Shawn Brock – bass (1996-2000)
- Nathan McCorkle – drums (1998-2001)
- Eminence Bessette – guitar (2024-2025)
- Victor Ashton – guitar (2024-2025)
- Ace Powders – drums (2024-2025)
- Jayson Cook – bass (2025)
