= More Than You Know (Out of Eden album) =

Studio album by Out of Eden
- Released: November 5, 1996
- Genres: R&B; Urban contemporary gospel Pop
- Label: Gotee Records
- Producer: The Gotee Brothers

Out of Eden chronology
Lovin' the Day (1994)	More Than You Know (1996)	No Turning Back (1999)

More Than You Know is the second album by American urban gospel group Out of Eden, released in 1996 on Gotee Records.

== Reception ==
Professional ratings
Review scores
Source	Rating
Allmusic	3/5 stars
Cross Rhythms	10/10 squaress

== Track listing ==
1. "More Than You Know" (Lisa Bragg, Michael Bragg, Todd Collins) - 4:09
2. "Greater Love" (Lisa Bragg, Michael Bragg) - 3:46
3. "It's Me" (Butch Dillon, Lisa Bragg, Micah Wilshire, Michael Bragg) - 4:25
4. "Good Time" (Lisa Bragg, Michael Bragg, Todd Collins) - 3:59
5. "You Brought The Sunshine" (Twinkie Clark) - 5:20
6. "Get It Right" (featuring Knowdaverbs) (Lisa Bragg, Michael Bragg) - 4:21
7. "Giving My All" (Lisa Bragg, Michael Bragg) - 3:54
8. "Confused" (Lisa Bragg, Michael Bragg) - 5:00
9. "Get To Heaven" (D. Paich, Lisa Bragg, Michael Bragg, Todd Collins) - 4:00
10. "Can't Let Go" (Lisa Bragg, Michael Bragg) - 3:31
11. "Then And Only Then" (Hall Delise, Lisa Bragg) - 20:10

== Personnel ==
Out of Eden

- Andrea Kimmey-Baca – vocals
- Danielle Kimmey – vocals
- Lisa Kimmey-Bragg – vocals, arrangements, producer, vocal producer

Musicians and Production

- Michael Bragg – keyboards, programming, percussion, string arrangements, producer
- Todd Collins – keyboards, programming, drums, engineer
- Jeff Roach – acoustic piano
- Tom Wanca – keyboards, engineer
- Micah Wilshire – guitars
- Otto Price – bass
- Todd Robbins – engineer
- Joe Baldridge – mixing
- Joe Costa – mixing
- Erik Wolf – mastering
- Kerri McKeehan-Stuart – artwork
- Diana Barnes – artwork
- Matthew Barnes – photography
