= Valerie Parv =

Australian romance novelist (1951–2021)

Valerie Parv AM
- Born: 1951; Australia
- Died: 25 April 2021 (aged 69); Canberra
- Occupation: Novelist
- Spouse: Paul (1970–2008)
- Writing career
- Period: 1982–2021
- Genre: Romantic novel
- Website: www.valerieparv.com

Valerie Christine Parv AM (1951 – 25 April 2021) was a popular Australian writer of over 70 romance novels with over 34 million sales. She has published her novels in Mills & Boon since 1982.

== Biography ==
Valerie married Paul Parv, a crocodile hunter in the tropical north of Australia. They lived for some years in Sydney. Her husband became a cartoonist, and they moved to the capital city, Canberra. They were married for 38 years before her husband died in 2008.

Valerie published her first novel in 1982. She was recognised as a media spokesperson for all things romantic in Australia.

== Awards and honours ==
Parv was an Australia Day Ambassador for the National Australia Day Council from 2006. She was also awarded the Romantic Times Book Reviews New York Pioneer of Romance Award.

In 2015, Parv was made a member of the Order of Australia for "significant service to the arts as a prolific author, and as a role model and mentor to young emerging writers."

== Bibliography ==
=== Single Novels ===
- Love's greatest gamble (1982)
- Bound for Kosciusko (1982)
- Remember Me, My Love (1983)
- The Tall Dark Stranger (1983)
- Dreaming Dunes (1984)
- Man and Wife (1985)
- Heartbreak Plains (1985)
- Ask Me No Questions (1985)
- The Love Artist (1986)
- Return to Faraway (1986)
- Boss of Yarrakina (1986)
- The Leopard Tree (1987)
- Snowy River Man (1987)
- Man Shy (1987)
- Sapphire Nights (1987)
- Centerfold (1988)
- Man without a Past (1988)
- Crocodile Creek (1988)
- Tasmanian Devil (1989)
- Lightning's Lady (1990)
- That Midas Man (1990)
- A Fair Exchange (1991)
- Far from Over (1991)
- Island of Dreams (1992)
- Love Like Gold (1992)
- Lovers' Moon (1993)
- Flight of Fancy (1993)
- Outback Temptation (1994)
- Flight of Fantasy (1994)
- P.S. I Love You (1995)
- A Reluctant Attraction (1995)
- Sister of the Bride (1996)
- A Royal Romance (1996)
- Kissed by a Stranger (1997)
- The Princess and the Playboy (1998)
- Interrupted Lullaby (2001)
- The Prince's Proposal (2002)
- Desert Justice (2006)

=== Baby Chase Series ===
1. The Billionaire's Baby Chase (1997)
2. Baby Wishes and Bachelor Kisses (1998)

=== Carramer Crown Series ===
==== Carramer Crown Sub-Series ====
1. The Monarch's Son (2000)
2. The Prince's Bride-To-Be (2000)
3. The Princess's Proposal (2000)

==== Carramer Legacy Sub-Series ====
1. Crowns and a Cradle (2002)
2. The Baron and the Bodyguard (2002)
3. The Marquis and the Mother-To-Be (2002)

==== Carramer Trust Sub-Series ====
1. The Viscount and the Virgin (2003)
2. The Princess and the Masked Man (2003)
3. The Prince and the Marriage Pact (2003)
4. Operation: Monarch (2004)

=== Code of the Outback Series ===
1. Deadly Intent (2004)
2. Heir to Danger (2004)
3. Live to Tell (2004)

=== Beacon Series ===
1. Birthright (2012)
1.5. Starfound (2016)
2. Earthbound (2016)
2.5. Continuum (2016)
3. Homeworld (2016)

=== Fabulous Fathers Series Multi-Author ===
- The Billionaire's Baby Chase (1997)

=== Royally Wed Series Multi-Author ===
- Code Name: Prince (2001)

=== Older Man Multi-Author ===
- Booties and the Beast (2001)

=== Romancing the Crown Series Multi-Author ===
- Royal Spy (2002)

=== Collections ===
- Forget Me Not (2006)

=== Omnibus In Collaboration ===
- To Wed a Royal (2002) (with Carla Cassidy)
- Operation – Monarch / Bulletproof Bride (2004) (with Diana Duncan)
- Shotgun Honeymoon / Heir to Danger (2004) (with Terese Ramin)
- Live to Tell / Racing Against the Clock (2004) (with Lori Wilde)
- Dangerous Memories / Deadly Intent (2005) (with Barbara Colley)

=== Non fiction ===
- The changing face of Australia: The impact of 200 years of change on our environment (1984)
- The Art of Romance Writing: How to Create, Write And Sell Your Contemporary Romance Novel (1993)
- The Idea Factory: A Guide to More Creative Thinking And Writing (1996)
- 34 million books: Australia's Queen of Romance Shares Her Life and Writing Tips (2020)

== Resources ==
- Valerie Parv's Official Website
- Harlequin Enterprises Ltd's Website
- Valerie Parv's Webpage in Fantastic Fiction's Website
