= Reborn (Finding Favour album) =

Studio album by Finding Favour
- Released: June 23, 2015
- Genres: Contemporary Christian music, worship, folk, gospel country
- Length: 40:42
- Label: Gotee
- Producer: Casey Brown

Finding Favour chronology
Finding Favour EP (2013)	Reborn (2015)

Reborn is the first studio album by Finding Favour, released the album on June 23, 2015 on Gotee Records. Finding Favour worked with Casey Brown, in the production of this album.

== Critical reception ==
Professional ratings
Review scores
Source	Rating
365 Days of Inspiring Media	4.5/5 stars
CCM Magazine	3.5/5 stars
The Christian Beat	4.0/5
Christian Music Review	3.5/5
Jesus Freak Hideout	3.5/5 stars
New Release Today	3.5/5 stars
The Phantom Tollbooth	3.5/5; 2.5/5

Matt Conner, awarding the album three and a half stars from CCM Magazine, states, "Even slower numbers are straightforward yet memorable, which make them easy to pick up and hold onto in meaningful moments." Rating the album three and a half stars at Jesus Freak Hideout, Christopher Smith writes, "Finding Favour can sometimes sound too comfortable following in the tracks (now more like a paved superhighway) of their pop-worship contemporaries, but they have enough personality and distinctiveness to make this album an enjoyable Christ-focused listening experience." Sarah Fine, giving the album three and a half stars for New Release Today, describes, "Despite some flaws, there are glimpses of excellence on this record worthy of your attention." Awarding the album a 3.5 out of five by Christian Music Review, Lauren McLean says, "Reborn is a great album, and I believe that it's an album that the young and old alike will love." Jonathan Andre, awarding the album four and a half stars at 365 Days of Inspiring Media, writes, "Reborn is perhaps one of my favourite albums, period, in 2015 so far, with the unique execution of worship, country, pop, folk, acoustic, and CCM all within the 11 songs." Rating the album three and a half out of five from The Phantom Tollbooth, Michael Dalton says, "This is easy to like; a welcome relief from one style of worship." Scott S. Mertens, giving the album a two and a half out of five at The Phantom Tollbooth, states, "Reborn shows promise." Indicating in a 4.0 review at The Christian Beat, Abby Baracskai recognizes, "these guys have created a rock solid first full-length album."

== Track listing ==
Reborn
No.	Title	Writer(s)	Length
1.	"Refuge"	Casey Brown, David Blake Neesmith, Jonathan Smith	4:22
2.	"I'll Find You"	Brown, Neesmith, Jeff Pardo	3:26
3.	"Cast My Cares"	Brown, Neesmith, Sam Tinnesz	3:37
4.	"Feels like the First Time"	Brown, Neesmith, Tinnesz	3:33
5.	"Be like You"	Neesmith, Pardo	3:45
6.	"Reborn"	Brown, Neesmith, Tinnesz	3:46
7.	"Tiny Town"	Brown, Neesmith, Tinnesz	3:51
8.	"Till Your Kingdom Comes"	Brown, Neesmith, Tinnesz	3:22
9.	"On the Water"	Neesmith, Nick de Partee	3:46
10.	"Hallelujah One More Time"	Benji Cowart, Michael Farren, Neesmith	4:12
11.	"Say Amen (Reprise)"	Neesmith, Farren, Jason Cox, Kenna West	3:02
Total length:			40:42

== Charts ==
Chart (2015)	Peak position
US Top Christian Albums (Billboard)	2
