= Alligator (Abandon Kansas album) =

Studio album by Abandon Kansas
- Released: May 11, 2015
- Genre: Alternative rock, indie rock
- Length: 34:03
- Label: Bad Christian

Abandon Kansas chronology
Ad Astra per Aspera (2011)	Alligator (2015)

Alligator is the third studio album from Abandon Kansas, released by Bad Christian Music on May 11, 2015.

== Critical reception ==
Professional ratings
Review scores
Source	Rating
HM Magazine	4/5 stars
Indie Vision Music	4/5 stars
Jesus Freak Hideout	3.5/5 stars 2.5/5 stars 4/5 stars

Ben Rickaby, giving the album four stars at HM, wrote, "This is a great indie alt-rock album featuring a wide range of musical styles and ambient sounds to effectively get across the raw emotion behind the lyrics." Awarding the album three and a half stars on Jesus Freak Hideout, Ryan Barbee said "this isn't a faultless album." Nathaniel Schexnayder, writing a two and a half stars review on Jesus Freak Hideout, stated: "maybe there should have been some extra thought put into this complicated album," criticizing the dark feeling of the album. Meanwhile, rating the album four stars for Jesus Freak Hideout, Scott Fryberger wrote, "alligator really feels like the band is finally coming into their own." Brody B., for his part, gave the album four stars at Indie Vision Music, describing that "despite some odd track placements, Alligator is an incredible record."

== Track listing ==
No.	Title	Length
1.	"Mirror"	3:07
2.	"Alligator"	3:05
3.	"I Hope God Don't Mind If We Talk Awhiles"	3:10
4.	"Baby Please"	3:14
5.	"Anniversary"	4:05
6.	"Get Clean"	4:04
7.	"Shadows"	3:29
8.	"What You Meant"	3:20
9.	"You Oughta Know"	3:29
10.	"One Foot in the Grave"	3:00
Total length:		34:03

== Charts ==
Weekly chart performance for Alligator
Chart (2015)	Peak position
US Top Christian Albums (Billboard)	23
US Heatseekers Albums (Billboard)	14
