= Abandon Kansas =

American alternative rock band

Glass Age
- Glass Age performing at Murray Hill Theatre on October 1, 2009

Background information
- Origin: Wichita, Kansas, US
- Genres: Alternative rock, Christian rock
- Years active: 2005-2015
- Labels: Gotee, Bad Christian
- Members: Jeremy Spring; Brian Scheideman; Nick Patrick
- Past members: Brad Foster; Brian Nixon; Sam Presley; Chris Martin; Brad Regier; Chet Kueffer
- Website: www.abandonkansaslovesyou.com

Glass Age, formerly known as Abandon Kansas, is an American alternative rock band originating from Wichita, Kansas that formed in 2005 and went on indefinite hiatus in 2015. The band has rebranded in 2019 and is making new music.

== History ==
Glass Age formed in 2005 in Wichita, Kansas, under the name "Abandon Kansas" — a play on the words "A band in Kansas". The band released their first EP independently in 2005. It was self-titled and received little recognition. Since then, Glass Age has slowly gained recognition in the Christian music market, achieving recognition by radio vehicles such as RadioU, video vehicles such as TVU, and music review websites such as Jesus Freak Hideout and Indie Vision Music. Gaining attention from local, independent, and few national venues, Glass Age continued releasing records. Three EPs and a full-length album were released from 2006 to 2009.

In 2009, Glass Age signed with Gotee Records. In the succeeding months, Abandon Kansas released one project. Their debut EP on Gotee Records, We're All Going Somewhere, was released on September 8, 2009. It contained no tracks that would be repeated on their subsequent full-length release, Ad Astra per Aspera. The song, "Months and Years," listed as track 5, was placed in regular rotation by RadioU, a national radio vehicle broadcasting from Ohio and California as well as from repeaters across the United States.

In 2011, Glass Age released a second self-titled EP one month before releasing their debut album on Gotee Records. Abandon Kansas was released on February 8, 2011, and contained four songs (including two repeats from their 2009 release) and two videos. Ad Astra per Aspera was released on March 8, 2011, and contained two songs from their 2011 EP. The band went on tour to promote their full-length release. "Heaven Come My Way," listed as track one, received rotation on RadioU.

Glass Age performed on the Mother, May I? Tour with Wavorly and Hyland. In early 2011, they had toured with Swimming with Dolphins, as well as Mike Mains and the Branches and From Indian Lakes on the first leg of the Ad Astra Per Aspera Record Release Tour. On the second leg of the tour, they performed with Showbread, Quiet Science, and The Wedding.

In 2014, Glass Age signed to Emery's independent record label and released their third full-length album Alligator on May 11, 2015.

In June 2015, a post on the band's Kansas Facebook page stated the following which has put the band in an indefinite hiatus: "Due to personal and relational circumstances in my life, I have decided it would be best for me and my family to cancel the rest of AK's tour dates in 2015. This is embarrassing, and I apologize for not being in a healthy enough state of mind to perform and tour. It's become clear that I need to take care of myself and deal with issues that have long been ignored. I am already in the process of doing this now. If you've purchased tickets, please still go to the shows and support the other bands. Thank you for your love and support - Jeremy;"

After nearly ten years since the band's latest release, they put out their first live album, Alligator (Live at Smokestack) on March 22, 2024.

== Members ==
=== Current members ===
- Jeremy Spring - lead vocals, guitar
- Nick Patrick - bass
- Logan Rine - guitar

=== Former members ===
- Brian Scheideman - drums
- Brian Nixon - keys, backing vocals
- Chris Martin - bass
- Sam Presley - bass
- Tyler Clarensau - keys, Guitar
- Brad Regier - drums
- Chet Kueffer - bass
- Michael Whipple - bass
- Brad Foster - Guitar
- Derek Harsch - Keys

== Discography ==
=== Studio albums ===
List of studio albums with selected chart positions
Title	Details	Peak chart positions	
Title	Details	US	US Christ
You Build a Wall, I'll Build a Ladder	Released: December 4, 2007; Label: Independent; Formats: CD, streaming	—	—
Ad Astra Per Aspera	Released: March 8, 2011; Label: Gotee Records; Formats: CD, digital download, streaming	—	—
Alligator	Released: May 11, 2015; Label: Bad Christian; Formats: CD, digital download, streaming	— (Note: Alligator did not enter the Billboard 200, but peaked at No. 14 on the Billboard Top Heatseekers)	23
"—" denotes a recording that did not chart or was not released in that territory.

=== Live Albums ===
List of extended plays with selected chart positions
Title	Details
Alligator (Live at Smokestack)	Released: March 22, 2024; Label: Independent; Formats: Digital download, streaming

=== Extended plays ===
List of extended plays with selected chart positions
Title	Details
Abandon Kansas	Released: 2005; Label: Independent; Formats: CD; Track listing: 1. "The Misconception of the Perception of Self""; 2. "Divine"; 3. "Again"; 4. "Simple"; 5. "Anywhere But Here"; 6. "Only One"
Exactly What We Needed	Released: 2006; Label: Independent; Formats: CD; Track listing: 1. "Fear of Heights"; 2. "Falls Apart"; 3. "Exactly What we Needed"
Minutes	Released: 2007; Label: Independent; Formats: CD, digital download; Track listing: 1. "Minutes"; 2. "The Message"; 3. "Eat em' While They're Blue"
The Earth Falls Asleep	Released: January 6, 2009; Label: Independent; Formats: CD, Digital download, streaming; Track listing: 1. "Minutes (acoustic)"; 2. "What if it's All in My Head? (acoustic)"; 3. "The Earth Falls Asleep (acoustic)"; 4. "You Build a Wall (acoustic)"; 5. "When did we Change? (acoustic)"
We're All Going Somewhere	Released: September 8, 2009; Label: Gotee Records; Formats: CD, Digital download, streaming; Track listing: 1. "The Harder They Fall"; 2. "I Wonder if it's Me"; 3. "Make Believe"; 4. "We're All Going Somewhere"; 5. "Months and Years"; 6. "Close Your Eyes"
Abandon Kansas	Released: February 8, 2011; Label: Gotee Records; Formats: CD, digital download; Track listing: 1. "Heaven Come my Way"; 2. "The Golden State"; 3. "Months and Years"; 4. "Close Your Eyes"
Turn it to Gold	Released: February 26, 2013; Label: Gotee Records; Formats: Digital download, streaming; Track listing: 1. "Turn it to Gold"; 2. "Stay the Same"; 3. "Chariot"; 4. "Don't Forget Where You Came From"; 5. "Close Your Eyes (acoustic)"
A Midwest Summer	Released: June 11, 2013; Label: Independent; Formats: CD, Digital download, streaming, Track listing: 1. "You + Me + the Radio"; 2. "The Chase"; 3. "Marching Around Me"
"—" denotes a recording that did not chart or was not released in that territory.
