= Relient K (album) =

Studio album by Relient K
- Released: April 25, 2000
- Studios: Yellow Studios (Canton, Ohio)
- Genre: Pop punk
- Length: 46:40
- Label: Gotee
- Producer: Mark Lee Townsend

Relient K chronology
2000 A.D.D. (2000)	Relient K (2000)	The Creepy EP (2001)

Singles from Relient K
- 1. "My Girlfriend" Released: 2000; 2. "Wake Up Call" Released: 2000

Relient K is the debut studio album by American rock band Relient K. It was released on April 25, 2000, via Gotee Records, their first album release under the label. Many of the tracks are newer versions of those found on their 1998 demo All Work & No Play. Typical of early Relient K albums, the lyrics use pop culture references for teaching and to illustrate Biblical principles.

== Background and recording ==
On June 20, 1998, the group released a demo album titled All Work & No Play. Recorded by Mark Lee Townsend, the album caught the attention of dc Talk's Toby McKeehan, who later signed the band to his label, Gotee Records.

The album was recorded by Mark Lee Townsend at his home studio, Yellow Studios in Canton, Ohio. It was mastered by Erik Wolf at Wolf Mastering and mixed by Russ Long at The Carport in Nashville. Townsend explained the decision to record the album at his home studio than in Nashville, recalling, "It was very disarming for them in a good way. We just worked at it and got it right. I didn't want to play guitar on the record. I wanted to force them to play. And they rose to the occasion." Drummer Stephen Cushman provides the screaming vocals on "Softer to Me", as well as some lead vocals on "Wake Up Call". "Hello McFly" and "Wake Up Call" were last second additions to the album.

== Composition and lyrics ==
Lyrically, the album makes references to pop culture for teaching and to illustrate Biblical principles. "Hello McFly" refers to the Back to the Future trilogy, in which the main character was named Marty McFly. The song is about the inability to change one's past. At the end of the song, Toby McKeehan calls Matt Thiessen, telling him that a song about Marilyn Manson will never be on a CD put out by Gotee Records (the call is followed by "My Girlfriend", a song about Marilyn Manson). "My Girlfriend" draws parallels to 1 Peter 5:8, where the Devil is portrayed as a Lion waiting to devour lives. It also references rocker Marilyn Manson and his song "The Beautiful People". According to Thiessen, he wrote the song because of a female friend, who lived eight hours away in Pennsylvania, who he would talk to about many things including spiritual matters such as where God was taking them in the future. His friend would later turn from Christian music to Nine Inch Nails and Marilyn Manson. "Wake Up Call" was inspired by "real life punk rock," and was written about singer Matt Thiessen's job as a night manager at Wendy's.

"Charles in Charge" was a cover of the theme from the TV series of the same name. "17 Magazine" refers to the magazine of the same name. "Nancy Drew" refers to the series of children's mysteries with the main character of the same name. This song also mentions The Hardy Boys, the brother series to Nancy Drew. "K Car" refers to Plymouth's Reliant K, based on the K Car platform, for which the band is named. The song features the line, "and Brandon Ebel just gave us a call", referring to the founder of the Christian record label Tooth & Nail Records. Following "K Car", a hidden track titled "Punk Rock Picnic" — Relient K's "Call Us Rock Stars" is played with various quotes dubbed over and then music from a polka concert at the end. It also features a recording of Relient K during a jam session.

== Release ==
On April 25, 2000, their debut album was officially released through Gotee Records. The album spawned two singles both released in 2000: the debut single "My Girlfriend" and "Wake Up Call". A promotional single titled "Softer to Me" was also released. Pre-release copies of the album feature a short track called "Ed Sullivan" which was excluded from the official release version.

On April 20, 2010, the group released a three-disc compilation album titled The First Three Gears 2000-2003, featuring songs from their first three albums. Disc one which is Relient K, features two bonus tracks, an acoustic version of "Softer to Me" and a live version of "Breakdown". The album pressed and released on vinyl on November 21, 2017.

== Critical reception ==
Professional ratings
Review scores
Source	Rating
Jesus Freak Hideout	3/5 stars
Exit Zine	3/5 stars
HM Magazine	

John DiBiase of Jesus Freak Hideout gave the album a generally positive review. He stated, "Their self-titled debut album is chock-full of pop icon commerical [sic] material from the Wendy's restaurant to Teen Magazine and Nancy Drew. It's youth-centered themes and pop/punk rock sensibilities make this record key for the young adults, but not so appealing for the slightly older crowd. An entertaining debut from 4 guys in their late-teens from Ohio that just wanna have fun and play Christian music."

Exit Zine wrote, "I am in love with these guys' sound, but I am also very disappointed with their lyrical content," highlighting "'My Girlfriend' to be very disturbing." Exit Zine ended the review remarking, "Relient K has a tight pop-punk sound on this album with nice vocal harmonies. The melodies are catchy, and they do a good job of varying the sound enough to keep one's interest for the whole album."

== Track listing ==
All tracks are written by Relient K, except where noted.

No.	Title	Writer(s)	Length
1.	"Hello McFly"		2:49
2.	"My Girlfriend"		2:47
3.	"Wake Up Call"		3:19
4.	"Benediction" (outro)		1:39
5.	"When You're Around"		2:02
6.	"Softer to Me"		3:22
7.	"Charles in Charge"	David Kurtz, Michael Jacobs, Al Burton	2:39
8.	"Staples"		2:59
9.	"Anchorage"		0:22
10.	"17 Magazine"		3:06
11.	"Balloon Ride"		2:58
12.	"Everything Will Be"		3:31
13.	"Nancy Drew"		2:48
14.	"K Car" (also includes two hidden tracks after interlude silences)		11:50
Total length:			46:40

The First Three Gears compilation album edition bonus tracks
No.	Title	Length
15.	"Breakdown (Live)" (originally from 2000 A.D.D EP)	4:14
16.	"Softer to Me (Acoustic)" (originally from The Creepy EP)	4:13

== Personnel ==
Credits adapted from album's liner notes.

Relient K

- Matt Thiessen – lead vocals, guitars
- Matt Hoopes – guitars, backing vocals
- Brian Pittman – bass guitar
- Stephen Cushman – drums, backing vocals

Production

- Todd Collins – executive producer
- Joey Elwood – executive producer
- Toby McKeehan – executive producer
- Mark Lee Townsend – producer, recording
- Russ Long – mixing at The Carport (Nashville, Tennessee)
- Erik Wolf – mastering at Wolf Mastering (Nashville, Tennessee)
- Mike McGlaflin – A&R
- Kerri McKeehan-Stuart – photography
- Brad Talbott – design, layout
- Timothy Eddings – management

== Release history ==
Release formats for Relient K
Region	Date	Format(s)	Label	Ref.
Various	April 25, 2000	CD; digital download	Gotee	
United States	November 21, 2017	Vinyl	Gotee	
