= Joey Elwood =

Christian Music Producer

Joey Elwood is an American Christian music producer and former recording artist.

== Career ==
Elwood is one of the co-founders of Gotee Records, along with the other Gotee Brothers, Toby McKeehan and Todd Collins.

The record label was created when, after failing to find a label willing to sign the group Out of Eden, Elwood, McKeehan, and Collins decided to produce Lovin' the Day on their own. Of the creation of Gotee Records, Elwood recalls, "We all collectively said, 'Let's just give this a shot.' At the risk of sounding unprofessional, it was a very naïve entry into the business. We basically learned every day, on the job, because we had no training for what we were doing, other than we loved music and we produced music. That was the entry point. Three naïve guys, a willing band, and some really good songs."

As a member of the Gotee Brothers, Elwood recorded "ERACE -Eliminating Racism and Creating Equality" with Todd Collins and his cousin Toby McKeehan, aka tobyMac.

Elwood is a producer in the Christian music market. He noticed the band StorySide:B when it only included two people. He appeared in the documentary "Faith and Fame," which featured tobyMac.
