= Out of Eden (gospel group) =

American gospel music group

Background information
- Origin: Nashville, Tennessee, U.S.
- Genres: Urban contemporary gospel; R&B
- Years active: 1994–2006, 2024–present
- Labels: Gotee, DARE Records
- Members: Lisa Kimmey Winans; Andrea Kimmey-Baca; Danielle Kimmey

Out of Eden is an American urban contemporary gospel group. It features sisters Lisa Kimmey, Andrea Kimmey-Baca, and Danielle Kimmey. The group was active from 1994 to 2006, then again starting in September 2024. During their initial run they produced seven albums through Gotee Records and received "Urban Album of the Year" and "Urban Song of the Year" at the Dove Awards of 2003.

== Musical career ==
=== Origins ===
The band consisted of three sisters Lisa Kimmey, Andrea Kimmey-Baca, and Danielle Kimmey, all born in Richmond, Virginia between 1975 and 1982 to Robert Kimmey and DeLise Perkins Kimmey Hall. When the girls were young, their parents divorced and they moved with their mother to Nashville, where DeLise was offered a teaching position at Fisk University. Danielle and her sisters initially sang back-up for their mother, who was a classical pianist. After their stepfather unsuccessfully attempted to garner attention for the girls by sending a video of their singing to various record labels, Danielle and her sisters were discovered by Toby McKeehan, who formed the record label Gotee Records to produce their music.

In 1994, they released their debut Lovin' the Day. The first single off the album was a remake of the Bill Withers 1978 single "Lovely Day" and was a Christian Contemporary Music hit. Their second album, in 1996, More Than You Know, was even more successful and catapulted the sisters into the CCM spotlight.

=== Mainstream Success ===
Their third album, the acclaimed No Turning Back, was released in 1999. Released in 2002, their fourth and best-selling Gotee album, This Is Your Life, entered the Billboard 200, peaking at No. 178. The album tied for "Urban Album of the Year" at the Dove Awards of 2003, with a song from the album, "Meditate" going on to win the award "Urban Recorded Song of the Year". The album was also nominated for a Stellar Award.

Another two years went by before the up-tempo album Love, Peace & Happiness was released. This album was nominated for Dove Awards in the Urban Gospel Album of the Year category and Urban Gospel Song of the Year category for the song "Soldiers".

In early 2005, Out of Eden presented an a cappella version of an old hymn at a "Focus on the Family" chapel service, receiving a standing ovation. Struck by the response to the hymn and the power of the lyrics, they decided to explore a new side of their musical talents and released a CD of remakes of classic hymns titled Hymns. The album was nominated for a 2006 Grammy award in the Best Pop/Contemporary Gospel Album category.

In June 2006, the group announced that they would disband after the release of their greatest hits album titled The Hits.

=== Return to Performing ===
On September 18, 2024, the band announced through their Instagram page that they would be returning, with announcements to come about future plans. On October 4, they released the EP "Lovely Day 3.0" under DARE Records.

== Awards ==
Year	Award-giving body	Award
2003	Dove Awards	Urban Album of the Year for This Is Your Life, shared with Souljahz for The Fault Is History
2003	Dove Awards	Urban Song of the Year for "Meditate" from This Is Your Life

== Discography ==
=== Studio albums ===
List of albums, with selected chart positions, sales figures and certifications
Title	Album details	Peak chart positions		
Title	Album details	US	US Christian	US Gospel
Lovin' the Day	First studio album; Released on March 22, 1994; Labels: Gotee Records; Formats: CD, cassette	—	10	—
More Than You Know	Second studio album; Released on November 5, 1996; Labels: Gotee Records; Formats: CD, cassette	—	14	29
No Turning Back	Third studio album; Released on June 15, 1999; Labels: Gotee Records; Formats: CD, cassette	—	6	9
This Is Your Life	Fourth studio album; Released on January 29, 2002; Labels: Gotee Records; Formats: CD	178	11	6
Love, Peace & Happiness	Fifth studio album; Released on Feb 20, 2004; Labels: Gotee Records; Formats: CD, digital download	—	16	20
Hymns	Sixth studio album; Released on March 29, 2005; Labels: Gotee Records; Formats: CD, digital download	—	29	—

=== Compilations ===
Year	Album
2006	Out of Eden: The Hits: First compilation album; Released on August 1, 2006; Labels: Gotee Records; Formats: CD, digital download
