= Tawny Weber =

American romantic fiction writer

- Born: Idaho, U.S.
- Occupation: Novelist
- Writing career
- Period: 2007–present
- Genre: Romance
- Website: www.tawnyweber.com

Tawny Weber is an American romantic fiction writer. Her books are published by Harlequin Blaze. Born in Idaho, she now lives in Northern California.

== Biography ==
Weber was born in Idaho. She has worked in a Las Vegas talent agency, was a tarot reader, intuitive healer, and a metaphysical hypnotherapist, focusing on past lives, inner child work, and healing energy. In 2005, she was a winner in the Harlequin Blaze Challenge. She has also been a multi-finalist for the Romance Writers of America Golden Heart Award, given to unpublished authors.

Her first novel, Double Dare, was published by Harlequin Blaze in May 2007. She's the past President of the Black Diamonds Romance Writers of America and previous VP of Administration of the SFA-RWA (San Francisco Area Romance Writers of America).

She lives in Northern California with her husband and two daughters.

== Bibliography ==
- Double Dare – 2007
- Does She Dare? – 2008
- Risqué Business – 2008
- Coming On Strong – April 2009
- Going Down Hard – May 2009
- Feels Like The First Time – September 2009
- You Have to Kiss a Lot of Frogs – Blazing Bedtime Stories volume III – January 2010
- Riding the Waves – September 2010
- Babe in Toyland – Must Have Been the Mistletoe Christmas Anthology – December 2010
- Breaking the Rules – February 2011
- Just For The Night – May 2011
- Sex, Lies and Mistletoe – December 2011
- Sex, Lies and Midnight – January 2012
- Sex, Lies and Valentines – February 2012
- Wild Thing - Blazing Bedtime Stories volume VII – June 2012

== Awards ==
- Harlequin Blaze Challenge Winner 2005
- CataRomance 2007 Best Book of the Year for Category for Double Dare
- CataRomance 2007 Best Book of the Year for Harlequin Blaze for Double Dare

== References and resources ==
- Tawny Weber Official Website
- From the Heart Interview
- The Call Interview by Kelly St. John
- Romance Diva Interview
