= Gotee Records =

American record label

- Parent company: Bell Partners Worldwide
- Founded: 1994; 32 years ago
- Founder: Toby "TobyMac" McKeehan, Todd Collins, Joey Elwood
- Distributor: Gotee
- Genre: Pop rock, contemporary Christian music, Christian hip hop, Christian rock
- Country of origin: United States
- Location: Franklin, Tennessee
- Official website: gotee.com

Gotee Records is a record label of Contemporary Christian music, based in Franklin, Tennessee in the United States.

== History ==
The label was founded in 1994 by TobyMac, Todd Collins and Joey Elwood. The first album produced is Out of Eden's Lovin' the Day. The label was a part of EMI Christian Music Group. However, they bought back EMI's minority share to become fully independent again as of March 31, 2008. Toby McKeehan is currently the president of the company. For a brief while, starting in 2009, the label was distributed by Warner Bros. Records.

McKeehan got the name "Gotee" from the song "Socially Acceptable" on dc Talk's album Free at Last. A member of the band GRITS was doing the background vocals, and he was saying, "Let it go, T, let it go." ("T" refers to Toby). McKeehan happened to be growing a goatee on his face at the time, and when Mark Heimermann pointed out the coincidence, he decided to name his new record company, "Gotee Records".

However, McKeehan does not publish his own albums under this title; instead he publishes his own records under the same label dc Talk was signed to, ForeFront Records, an imprint of Universal Music Group. He owns the name the Gotee Bros.

In May 2015 Gotee was acquired by Zealot Networks. Zealot's Nashville office is headed by former Gotee artist John Reuben. As part of the acquisition Gotee is still operated independently.

In February 2025 Gotee was acquired by Bell Partners Worldwide.

== Artists ==
=== Current ===
- Charly Perry
- Cochren & Co.
- Matt Hammitt
- Mackenzie Phillips
- Jon Reddick
- Joseph O'Brien
- Leslie Perez
- lydi lynn
- RENEE
- Ryan Stevenson
- Terrian

=== Former ===
- Abandon Kansas (active, independent)
- Flynn Adam (active, independent)
- Jeff Anderson (active)
- Aguilar
- Aaron Cole (active, currently signed to Provident Label Group/RCA Inspiration)
- Christafari (active, on Soul of Zion Entertainment)
- Curious Fools (disbanded)
- Jeff Deyo (active, on Indelible Creative Group)
- Deepspace5 (active, on Deepspace5 Records)
- DJ Maj (active, on Tractor-Beam Records)
- Family Force 5 (on hiatus; currently on Word Records)
- Finding Favour (active)
- Fighting Instinct (disbanded)
- 4th Avenue Jones (disbanded)
- The Gotee Bros. (disbanded, side project of tobyMac of DC Talk)
- Jamie Grace (active, independent)
- GRITS (on hiatus)
- Hollyn (active, currently signed to Alienz Alive)
- House of Heroes (active, currently independent)
- I Am Terrified (active, currently independent)
- The Katinas (active, unsigned)
- Capital Kings (active, independent)
- Sarah Kelly (active, currently an owner of Sarah Kelly Music School)
- Jennifer Knapp (active, currently unsigned)
- Knowdaverbs (changed name to Verbs; currently with 1280 Music)
- Johnny Q. Public (disbanded)
- LA Symphony (on hiatus; members now performing solo)
- Liquid (active, unsigned)
- Mars Ill (active, on Deepspace5 Records)
- Morgan Harper Nichols (active, independent)
- Our Heart's Hero (disbanded)
- Out of Eden (disbanded)
- Courtnie Ramirez
- Richlin (stylized as RICHLIN)
- Relient K (active, on Mono Vs Stereo Records)
- Stephanie Smith (on hiatus; currently in Copperlily)
- Sonicflood (active on Resonate Records)
- StorySide:B (disbanded)
- B. Reith (active, currently independent)
- John Reuben (active, currently independent)
- Ayiesha Woods (active, independent)
- Paul Wright (active, unsigned)
- Andy Zipf (active, with P is for Panda Records)

== Compilations ==
- Gotee Records presents: Showcase
- We Are Hip Hope
- Freaked! A Tribute to dc Talk's Jesus Freak
- Gotee Records Freshman Class 2000
- Gotee Records: The Soundtrack
- Ten Years Brand New
- Gotee Night Out
- Hip Hope Hits collection
- Tis the Season to be Gotee
- Tis the Season to be Gotee Too
- Gotee Records: Twenty Years Brand New

== RIAA gold certifications ==
Year	Artist	Album
2001	Sonicflood	Sonicflood
2001	Jennifer Knapp	Kansas
2005	Relient K	Two Lefts Don't Make a Right... But Three Do
2005	Relient K	Mmhmm
2005	Relient K	Be My Escape (single)
2006	Relient K	Who I Am Hates Who I've Been (single)
2006	Relient K	Anatomy of the Tongue in Cheek
2014	Jamie Grace	Hold Me (single)
2019	Grits	Ooh ahh (single)
2019	Ryan Stevenson	Eye of the Storm (single)
2024	Cochren & Co.	Church (Take Me Back) (single)

== See also ==
- List of record labels
- EMI Christian Music Group
- Joey Elwood
- Mono Vs. Stereo (Independent Rock Imprint of Gotee)
