= Stephanie Smith =

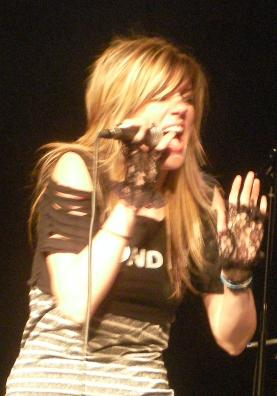
- Stephanie Smith at Winter Wonder Slam 2009

Background information
- Genres: Contemporary Christian music, pop rock, Christian rock
- Occupation: Singer-songwriter
- Instruments: Vocals, guitars, keyboards
- Years active: 2005–present
- Label: Gotee
- Website: www.stephanieisagirl.com

Stephanie Smith is an American contemporary Christian music singer-songwriter. She is signed to Gotee Records. Her first studio album, Not Afraid, was released on May 27, 2008, digitally and in stores on December 23, 2008. She received national attention on the Winter Wonder Slam tour with TobyMac.

== Biography ==
Stephanie Smith graduated from Greenville College in Illinois in 2006. It was at Greenville College that she first met Gotee Records manager TobyMac, while performing at the annual AgapeFest. Toby then signed her to the record label. She has written a book with Suzy Weibel titled Crossroads: The Teenage Girl's Guide to Emotional Wounds, which was released on June 1, 2008. She is featured on the House of Heroes song "God Save Us the Foolish Kings" which was released in 2011. In November 2012, Smith married House of Heroes frontman, Tim Skipper. The two started creating their own music under the name Copperlily and released Love Is a Legend in 2014.

== Personal life ==
Stephanie's work has often been driven by the pain caused by the lack of a relationship with her father, whom she loved dearly but was absent from her life from a very early age. She performed "Piece by Piece" on NBC's The Voice as a tribute to her experience. Stephanie's father died in October 2020.

== Discography ==
Albums

- 2008: Not Afraid
- 2009: Stephanie Smith EP
- 2010: I Celebrate The Day EP

Singles

- "Superstar", No. 3 New And Active at CHR radio
- "Not Afraid", No. 19 on R&R's Christian CHR chart, for the week of February 16, 2008
- "Renew Me"
- "In My Eyes", No. 8 on R&R's Christian Rock chart
- "God Save Us the Foolish Kings" (featured by House of Heroes) (2010)
- "Letting Go" (2012)

=== Compilation appearances ===
- 2007: "Superstar", Gotee Ladies (Gotee Records)
- 2009: "Not Afraid", ConGRADulations! Class of 2009 (Interlinc)
- 2010: "I Celebrate The Day" and "Jingle Bell Rock", Tis The Season to Be Gotee (Gotee)
