= Markus Bailey =

American football player (born 1997)

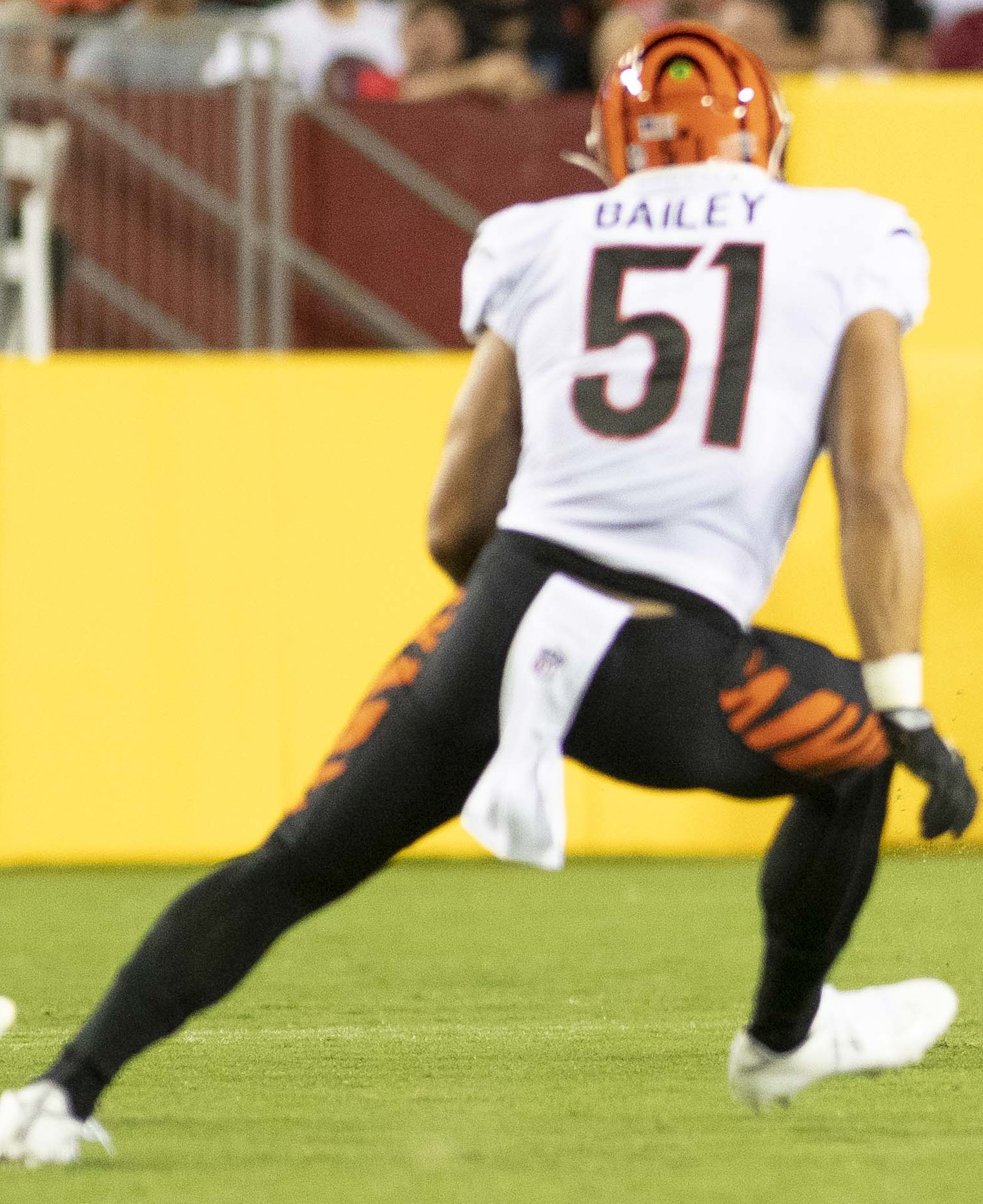
- Bailey with the Cincinnati Bengals in 2021

Profile
- Position: Linebacker

Personal information
- Born: March 7, 1997 (age 29); Columbus, Ohio, U.S.
- Listed height: 6 ft 1 in (1.85 m)
- Listed weight: 235 lb (107 kg)

Career information
- High school: Hilliard Davidson (Hilliard, Ohio)
- College: Purdue (2015–2019)
- NFL draft: 2020: 7th round, 215th overall pick

Career history
- Cincinnati Bengals (2020–2023); Arizona Cardinals (2024)*
- * Offseason or practice squad member only

Career NFL statistics as of 2023
- Total tackles: 73
- Sacks: 0.5
- Pass deflections: 4
- Stats at Pro Football Reference

Markus LaJuan Bailey (born March 7, 1997) is an American professional football linebacker. He played college football for the Purdue Boilermakers.

== College career ==
After playing at Hilliard Davidson High School, Bailey committed to Purdue on July 13, 2014, choosing the Boilermakers over Akron, Duke, Indiana, Pittsburgh, and West Virginia, among others, although an elusive offer from Ohio State never came.

After being sidelined by a torn ACL during his true freshman season, Bailey started 13 games in each of his redshirt sophomore and junior seasons. After his junior season, Bailey was named second-team all-Big Ten by coaches and third-team all-Big Ten by the media. A knee injury ended Bailey's senior season after two games. He was named a team captain during his junior and senior seasons.

== Professional career ==
Pre-draft measurables
Height	Weight	Arm length	Hand span	Bench press
6 ft 0 1/8 in (1.83 m)	235 lb (107 kg)	31 1/2 in (0.80 m)	9 3/8 in (0.24 m)	15 reps
All values from NFL Combine

=== Cincinnati Bengals ===
Bailey was selected by the Cincinnati Bengals with the 215th overall pick in the seventh round of the 2020 NFL draft. He was placed on the active/non-football injury list on July 27, 2020. He was moved back to the active roster on August 2.

=== Arizona Cardinals ===
On May 7, 2024, Bailey signed a one-year contract with the Arizona Cardinals. He was released on August 27, and re-signed to the practice squad. On November 19, the NFL suspended Bailey for 6 games after he violated the league's PED policy.

== Personal life ==
Bailey was named all-Academic Big Ten his redshirt freshman, sophomore, and junior seasons.
