= HUMC =

HUMC may refer to:

- Hackensack University Medical Center, a tertiary care hospital in Hackensack, New Jersey, USA
- Hoboken University Medical Center, a community hospital in Hoboken, New Jersey, USA
- Hilliard United Methodist Church, a historical church in Hilliard, Ohio, USA
