= The End Is Not the End =

The End Is Not the End may refer to:

- The End Is Not the End (Atreyu album), 2026
- The End Is Not the End (House of Heroes album), 2008
