= Suburba =

Studio album by House of Heroes
- Released: August 3, 2010
- Recorded: s-s-Studio, Spring Hill, Tennessee
- Genre: Alternative rock, Christian rock
- Label: Gotee
- Producer: Mark Lee Townsend

House of Heroes chronology
| The End Is Not the End (2008) | Suburba (2010) | Cold Hard Want (2012) |

Suburba is the fourth full-length album by the band House of Heroes. They went into Dark Horse Recording Studio on February 1, 2010, to record it with producer Mark Lee Townsend. It was released on August 3, 2010, through Gotee Records. On April 5, the band premiered two songs on the Eastern American Radio Network titled "RadioU": "Elevator" and "Constant". On April 18, 2010, the mixing for the album was completed.

House of Heroes commented about the album on their Facebook page, "Just south of 5th Ave. on Riverside Dr./33 in Columbus, OH is the Suburban Building. The N fell off the end of the word... This is what inspired the title of our new record. A record about growing up in the suburbs of middle class America, and having big dreams. There are triumphs and failures, and sometimes letters fall off the ends of words... " The song "Burn Me Down" was inspired by the British band Muse, of whom Tim Skipper is a big fan. Suburba debuted at No. 48 on the Billboard 200, which is House of Heroes' highest position to date.

On May 24, 2010 they released a lyric video for the song "God Save the Foolish Kings", and on July 20, a similar one for "Love Is for the Middle Class" was released. On July 27, 2010 they also released a music video for "God Save the Foolish Kings".

== Awards ==
The album was nominated for a Dove Award for Recorded Music Packaging of the Year at the 42nd GMA Dove Awards.

== Critical reception ==
Professional ratings
Review scores
| Source | Rating |
|---|---|
| Alternative Press | 3.5/5 stars |
| Alternative Addiction | 4/5 stars |
| CCM Magazine | 3/5 stars |
| Christian Music Zine | 5/5 stars |
| Christianity Today | 3/5 stars |
| Cross Rhythms | 9/10 stars |
| Indie Vision Music | 4/5 stars |
| Jesus Freak Hideout | 4.5/5 stars 4/5 stars |
| New Release Tuesday | 3.5/5 stars 5/5 stars |
| The Punk Site | 3.5/5 stars |

Alter The Press's George Gadd wrote that "It's clear that with 'Suburba', House of Heroes could easily take on arenas and stadiums and have their songs shouted back to them, it's time for us to let go of our little secrets and let them become successful".

Evan C. Jones of Alternative Press wrote that "Suburba, shows off what the masses have been missing: catchy pop songs with well-written lyrics...Suburba's songs remain full of power while retaining the delicate touch of songwriting craftsmanship...Suburba showcases House Of Heroes’ strengths and should be garnering them new fans; if not, they’ll just keep being one of music’s hidden gems."

Mike of Alternative Addiction wrote that "With ‘Suburba’ House of Heroes has taken the whole sound to a new level. The ultimate attraction of this album is the seamless and natural way that House of Heroes has been able to combine different genres and specific elements of other artists into a workable, accessible and extremely cohesive album."

CCM Magazine's Matt Conner wrote that "Lyrically, Tim Skipper & Co. conquer suburban life on the aptly titled Suburba, but it's the musical ground the cover on the album's 12 songs that's most impressive...HoH deftly moves across rock's terrain and feels at home all the way."

Christian Music Zine's Tyler Hess wrote that "Sururba [sic], has it’s [sic] moments of brilliance while tightening their sound for an ever broadening audience...Suburba is clearly going to be something to gather the family for, take a day off, eat some burgers and hot dogs and listen to one of the top albums of 2010."

Christian Rock 20's Paul Gibson wrote that "Other favorites are well, all of them, every song rocks and it just different enough to not sound the same, and feel more like an album of 12 songs meant to be together. The End Is Not The End was and is an awesome album, but for me I enjoy this more because of it cohesiveness. Also, there is a certain vibe that will really get fans of theatre going. Suburba just begs for a stage. I want to see some ambitious person turn this into a rock opera."

Christianity Today's Andy Argyrakis wrote that "Brimming with power chords, shiny synths, monstrous melodies, and youthful enthusiasm, House of Heroes' fourth studio album screams summertime. Crisply produced by Mark Lee Townsend (Relient K), the project is split between rip-roaring classic rockers and modern alt-pop gems, only occasionally coming off as derivative during its Electric Light Orchestra-like power pop surges. But there's more musical muscle and lyrical maturity as the band searches for spiritual significance, interjecting shots of inspiration to combat the mundane moments of suburban living."

CMADDICT's Kevin Thorson wrote that "'Suburba' is an energetic album that feels huge and yet has that garage band next door feel, down to earth and full of life: 'Suburba' is not a shallow album at all, but quite the opposite. With its more than fair share of hope-filled worship ballads...There's alot [sic] to like about this release, a perfect blend of energetic fun and inspiring songs all wrapped in one. An excellent "summer-fun" album and quite possibly the best rock album of 2010. A definite must get."

Cross Rhythms' Tim Holden wrote that "'Suburba' should be a great album and it does not disappoint. Something of a concept work dealing with living and growing up in the suburbs, the album covers a lot of ground without dodging issues or looking at the past through rose colour spectacles. The group's trademark vocal harmonies and twin guitar breaks are wonderfully handled in the production resulting in a full sound that is not too busy and lyrics that are not lost. The older among us will recognise the Bruce Springsteen and Tom Petty style riffs while the younger will be recalling the Darkness as the album powers forward without letup. If '80s vocal harmony rock with a lot of fuzz guitar is not your thing then this is definitely one to avoid. But otherwise get hold 'Suburba' as this is truly outstanding of its type."

Indie Vision Music's Alex Schelldorf wrote that "Don’t listen to the naysayers. This record stands on its own feet against its older sibling, 2008′s critically acclaimed The End is Not the End. Don’t get it twisted: it’s every bit as good."

Jesus Freak Hideout's Josh Taylor wrote that "It's not quite the groundbreaker that its predecessor was, but then again, it's so radically different, that comparisons aren't really even fair. On its own merit, Suburba is by far the most fun you will have this summer, with enough meat to keep you coming back listen after listen. Rock 'n roll hasn't sounded this good in a long time. Suburba is leaps and bounds better than any competition for your hard earned American dollars this year."

Jesus Freak Hideout's Scott Fryberger wrote that "In House of Heroes' defense, however, I don't know if anyone really expected it to surpass The End..., so that doesn't have a lot of bearing. The album is still really good and worth the money. Suburba is good for fans of rock music and House of Heroes in general."

New Release Tuesday's Jonathan Francesco wrote that "As a whole, I like Suburbia. It was definitely worth the $3.98($2.99 from Amazon plus $.99 for "Patient" from iTunes)it cost me. Most of those songs will likely find significant play in my MP3 Player for months to come. I don't think it's as good as its predecessor, but it's still very good, and indeed among the better releases this year. However, I think it's a bit pre-mature to call this "Album of the Year" material at this stage in the game. It's a very good album, but unless you are in love with everything this band does, you might find that it is definitely a bit overpraised. Again, that's not to say it is a bad album at all, but I'm not handing out the awards for it yet."

New Release Tuesday's Kevin Davis wrote that "Suburba is an album like nothing else you will hear today...Suburba is hooky, ambitious, and dripping with honest, candid emotion. This is what a rock record is supposed to sound like. This is what a rock record is supposed to feel like...Suburba is without a doubt the top punk rock album of the year...This album will stay in heavy rotation for me and although I didn?t [sic] think it was remotely possible to match the intensity and brilliance of The End Is Not The End, after constant listening of Suburba, I?m [sic] now convinced that this is their best overall album and one of my top 5 albums of 2010."

The Punk Site's Jenn Cosgrove wrote that "Suburba...is what I would describe as retro-inspired rock."

== Track listing ==
All tracks are written by A.J. Babcock, Colin Rigsby, Jared Rigsby & Tim Skipper.

| No. | Title | Length |
|---|---|---|
| 1. | "Relentless" | 4:29 |
| 2. | "Elevator" | 2:58 |
| 3. | "Love Is For the Middle Class" | 3:14 |
| 4. | "So Far Away" | 3:41 |
| 5. | "God Save the Foolish Kings" (featuring Stephanie Smith) | 3:51 |
| 6. | "Salt in the Sea" | 4:28 |
| 7. | "Independence Day for a Petty Thief" | 3:43 |
| 8. | "Somebody Knows" | 3:44 |
| 9. | "Disappear" | 4:24 |
| 10. | "She Mighty Mighty" | 3:22 |
| 11. | "Constant" | 3:28 |
| 12. | "Burn Me Down" | 5:21 |
| Total length: | | 46:53 |

iTunes bonus track
| No. | Title | Length |
|---|---|---|
| 13. | "Patient" | 2:43 |
| Total length: | | 49:36 |

Amazon MP3 bonus track
| No. | Title | Length |
|---|---|---|
| 13. | "Galveston" | 3:45 |

== Charts ==
| Chart (2011) | Peak position |
|---|---|
| US Billboard 200 | 48 |
| US Billboard Christian Albums | 2 |
| US Billboard Digital Albums | 8 |
| US Billboard Rock Albums | 18 |

== Singles ==
- "Elevator"
- "Constant"
- "God Save the Foolish Kings"
- "So Far Away"
- "Burn Me Down"
