= Hilliard City School District =

School district in Ohio

Address
- 2140 Atlas Street Columbus, OH 43228 Columbus, Ohio Midwest United States
- Coordinates: 40°2′4″N 83°8′34″W

District information
- Type: Public-Suburban
- Motto: Ready for Tomorrow
- Grades: PK-12
- Established: 1969
- Superintendent: Mr. David Stewart
- Schools: 22
- Budget: $248.7 million (USD)

Students and staff
- Students: 16,068
- Teachers: 935.09
- Staff: 69
- Athletic conference: Ohio Capital Conference

Other information
- Website: Hilliard Schools

Hilliard City School District is a public school district with its headquarters in Columbus, Ohio. The school district contains all of what was once Norwich and Brown townships. This includes The City of Hilliard.

In 2009, Hilliard City School District was awarded the "Excellent with Distinction" rating by the Ohio Department of Education, which is the agency's highest rating.

In 2011, Hilliard City School District was once again awarded with the "Excellent with Distinction" rating by the Ohio Department of Education.

The district operates 14 elementary schools (K-5th Grades), two sixth grade schools (separated from their middle schools), three middle schools (7-8th Grades), and three high schools (9-12th grades). Thus, the district is the eighth largest in Ohio.

== Service area ==
The district's service area has a total of about 60 square miles (160 km^{2}) of area, including portions of northwestern Franklin County and a portion of Union County smaller than 1 square mile (2.6 km^{2}). Within Franklin County areas served by this district include the City of Hilliard, portions of Columbus and Dublin, all of the townships of Brown and Norwich, and portions of the townships of Franklin, Prairie, and Washington.

== Demographics ==
As of January 2014, of the students, about 38.98% reside in the City of Hilliard. 45.65% reside in Columbus, 3.99% reside in Dublin, and 11.38% are residents of the townships.

== Schools ==
=== Elementary schools ===
- Alton Darby Creek Campus (Alton Darby Building K-2: 2730 Alton Darby Creek Rd, Hilliard, OH) (Darby Creek Building 3-5: 6305 Pinefield Dr, Hilliard)
- Avery Elementary School (4388 Avery Rd, Hilliard)
- Beacon Elementary School (3600 Lacon Rd, Hilliard)
- Britton-Norwich Learning Campus (Britton Building K-2: 4501 Britton Rd, Hilliard) (Norwich Building 3-5: 4454 Davidson Rd, Hilliard)
- [OUT OF SERVICE] Brown Elementary School (2494 Walker Rd, Hilliard)
- Hilliard Crossing Elementary School (3340 Hilliard Rome Rd, Hilliard)
- Hilliard Horizon Elementary School (6000 Renner Rd, Columbus)
- Hoffman Trails Elementary School (4301 Hoffman Farms Dr, Hilliard)
- J.W. Reason Elementary School (4790 Cemetery Rd, Hilliard)
- Ridgewood Elementary School (4237 Dublin Rd, Hilliard)
- Scioto Darby Elementary School (5380 Scioto Darby Rd, Hilliard)
- Washington Elementary School (5675 Eierman Rd, Dublin)

=== Sixth Grade Schools ===
- Hilliard Station Sixth Grade School (5600 Scioto Darby Rd, Hilliard) (About To be shut down in 2027)
- Hilliard Tharp Sixth Grade School (4681 Leap Rd, Hilliard)
- New Sixth Grade School - Upcoming

=== Middle schools ===
- Hilliard Heritage Middle School (5670 Scioto Darby Rd, Hilliard)
- Hilliard Memorial Middle School (2900 Walker Rd, Hilliard)
- Hilliard Weaver Middle School (4600 Avery Rd, Hilliard)

=== High schools ===
- Hilliard Bradley High School (2800 Walker Rd, Hilliard)
- Hilliard Darby High School (4200 Leppert Rd, Hilliard)
- Hilliard Davidson High School (5100 Davidson Rd, Hilliard)
