= Not Afraid (album) =

Studio album by Stephanie Smith
- Released: December 23, 2008
- Genre: Christian rock, CCM, pop rock
- Length: 39:48
- Label: Gotee
- Producer: Jamie Moore

Not Afraid is the debut studio album by Christian pop rock singer Stephanie Smith. It was released on December 23, 2008, through Gotee Records. The album features the radio singles "Superstar", "Not Afraid" and "Renew Me".

== Track listing ==
1. "Beauty" [03:38]
2. "Superstar" [03:12]
3. "Not Afraid" [03:30]
4. "Renew Me" [03:01]
5. "You Alone" [03:54]
6. "Waitin' On You" [03:32]
7. "Over It" [02:48]
8. "In My Eyes" [03:37]
9. "What If I Made A Mistake?" [03:58]
10. "Love Out Loud" [03:40]
11. "First Words" [04:58]
