= Say No More (House of Heroes album) =

Studio album by House of Heroes
- Released: May 2, 2006
- Studios: Bois D'Arc Music, Bois D'Arc, Missouri, Workbook Studios in Columbus, Ohio
- Genre: Christian rock
- Length: 51:59
- Label: Mono vs Stereo
- Producers: Oran Thornton, House of Heroes

House of Heroes chronology
House of Heroes (2005)	Say No More (2006)	The End Is Not the End (2008)

Professional ratings
Review scores
Source	Rating
Cross Rhythms	6/10 squares
Jesus Freak Hideout	4/5 stars

Say No More is an album from Christian rock band House of Heroes, released on May 2, 2006. While the CD is technically a full-length album, it is mainly a re-release of the band's second album. Unlike House of Heroes, this album was not released on Gotee Records. Instead, it was released on Gotee's imprint label, Mono Vs Stereo. Other than the instrumental "The Bois D'arc Circus" being added onto the end of "Pulling Back The Skin" to make one track, adding two new songs, and the cover art and title being changed, it is the same record. The other songs, with the exception of tracks 4 and 9 (which are the new songs featured on the re-issue) are the same recording of the previous album. The band calls this an album, but admits is not really an entirely new album. The band does play the song "The Invisible Hook" at shows, and the song is played on Christian radio stations, so the album has become as popular as their previous releases. In fact, the band often names this album rather than the previous album when referring to songs of this era.

== Track listing ==
1. "Buckets for Bullet Wounds" - 3:39
2. "Fast Enough" - 4:03
3. "Friday Night" - 3:25
4. "The Invisible Hook" - 3:31
5. "Mercedes Baby" - 3:27
6. "Serial Sleepers" - 3:10
7. "Make a Face Like You Mean It (Vampires)" - 3:12
8. "Metaphor in Parentheses" - 4:46
9. "You Are the Judas of the Cheerleading Squad" - 4:54
10. "Pulling Back the Skin" - 5:43
11. "Suicide Baby" - 3:13
12. "Angels in Top Hats" - 8:56

== Notes ==
- The song "Mercedes Baby" appears as an earlier version (with extended instrumental intro and outro) on the band's first release What You Want Is Now.
- The song "Suicide Baby" also appears as an earlier version but titled "Kamikaze Baby" on the band's first release What You Want Is Now.
- The songs "The Invisible Hook" and "You Are the Judas Of The Cheerleading Squad" are new to this record and are not featured on the nearly identical previous release House of Heroes.

== Singles ==
- "The Invisible Hook"

== Music videos ==
- "Serial Sleepers"
