= Hilliard Bradley High School =

Location
- 2800 Walker Road; Hilliard, Ohio 43026; United States; 40°0′23″N 83°12′4″W

Information
- Type: Public, Coeducational high school
- Established: c.2009
- School district: Hilliard City Schools
- Superintendent: David Stewart
- Principal: Cort Hamilton
- Teaching staff: 88.78 (on an FTE basis)
- Grades: 9-12
- Enrollment: 1,712 (2024–2025)
- Student to teacher ratio: 19.28
- Colors: Royal Blue, Black, and Silver
- Athletics conference: Ohio Capital Conference
- Mascot: Jaguar
- Accreditation: North Central Association of Colleges and Schools (pending)
- Newspaper: The Jaguar Times
- Website: https://www.hilliardschools.org/hbr/
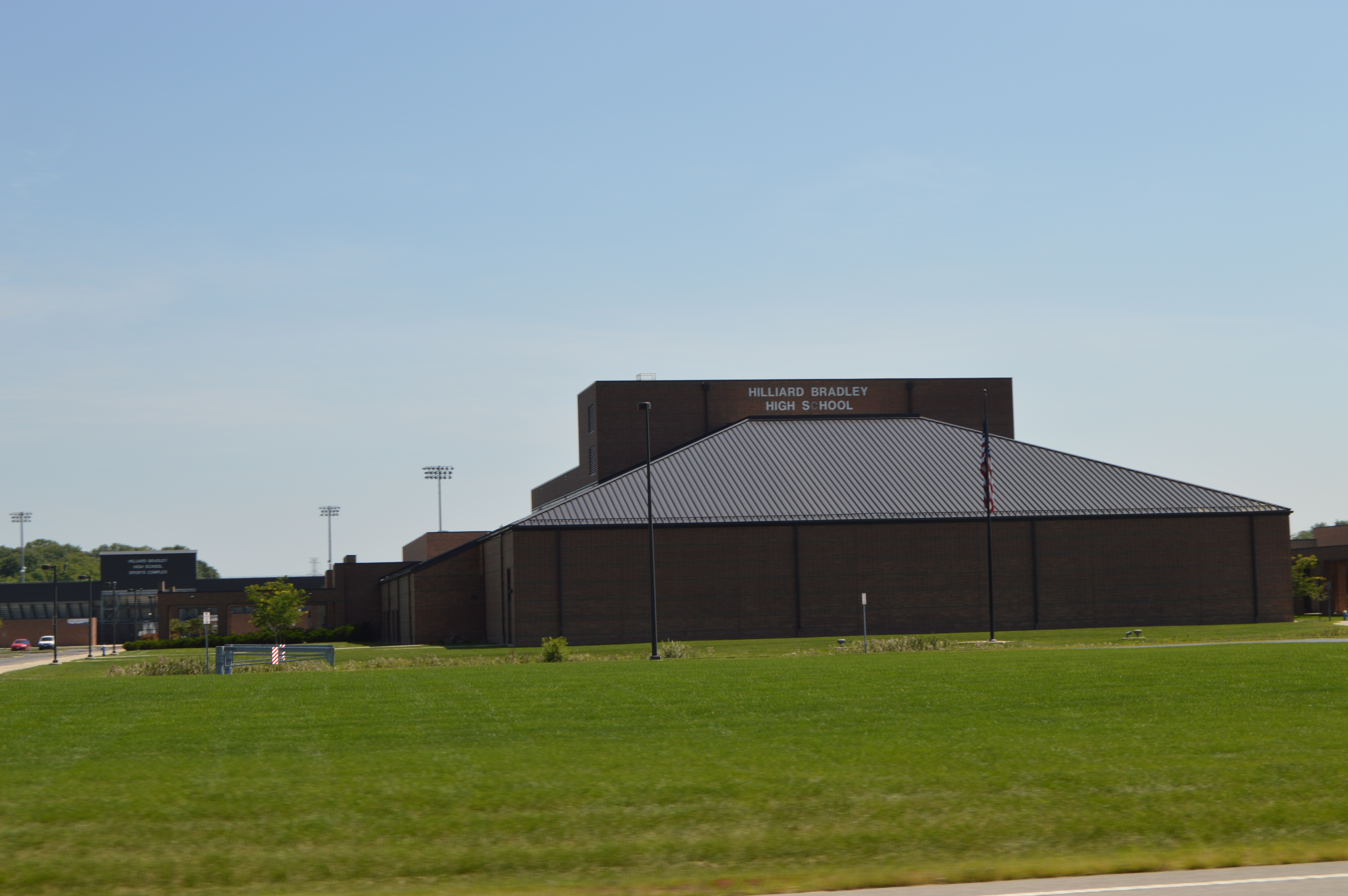

Hilliard Bradley High School is the newest high school in the Hilliard City School District in Hilliard, Ohio. It is one of three high schools in the district along with Hilliard Davidson High School and Hilliard Darby High School. The school is located at 2800 Walker Road, just southeast of Hilliard Memorial Middle School. The mascot is the Jaguar and the school's colors are royal blue, black and silver. Bradley High School is named in honor of Raymond K. Bradley, a former Hilliard Board of Education member and a lifelong Brown Township resident. It is the school that students from Hilliard Memorial Middle School will attend in High School. Both Bradley and Memorial’s mascot is a Jaguar.

The principal is Cort Hamilton. The school also retains three assistant principals and three guidance counselors.

== Construction ==
Ground was broken on Hilliard Bradley High School on May 7, 2007 after Hilliard City School District residents passed a bond issue in May 2006 for the construction of a third high school and fourteenth elementary school. Bradley was dedicated on August 23, 2009, and opened for its first day of classes on August 25, 2009.

=== Environmental concerns ===
Bradley was constructed with all possible efforts in place to limit its effect on neighboring Big Darby Creek. The system in place is designed to prevent erosion by limiting water running off from parking lots using drains that will allow water to seep directly into the ground. These measures contributed to 2% of the schools $65 million construction cost.

== Athletics ==
=== State championships ===
- Softball - 2026
