= Colors (House of Heroes album) =

Studio album by House of Heroes
- Released: July 1, 2016
- Genre: Alternative rock; Christian rock
- Length: 46:51
- Label: Bad Christian

House of Heroes chronology
Cold Hard Want (2012)	Colors (2016)

Colors is the sixth studio album by House of Heroes released on July 1, 2016 through Bad Christian Music. It is a concept album that involves three fictional characters: Eric, Axel, and Joni.

== Critical reception ==
Professional ratings
Review scores
Source	Rating
CM Addict	2/5 stars
Jesus Freak Hideout	4/5 stars 4.5/5 stars
Mind Equals Blown	8/10
New Noise Magazine	5/5 stars
New Release Today	4/5 stars
Tuned Up	4/5 stars

Nicholas Senior describes, "Colors isn’t immediate, but with time it proves to be the group’s most complete album yet." Christopher Smith says, "Colors is...an ambitious and unique piece of art that is best experienced with speakers blaring." Jonathan J. Francesco writes, "Colors finds them doing what they do best." Tim Dodderidge states, "It’s rare to find a concept record with so many standout tracks, and Colors is chock full of them." Dave Appelt suggests, "This album has plenty of memorable moments". Dylan O'Connor responds, "it's another wonderful addition to House of Heroes' already impressive catalog." Michael Weaver replies, "Colors...is a concept album that features some of the band's best musical pieces to date". Jon Ownbey believes, "As a whole, this is a definite pass over."

== Track listing ==
All tracks are written by A.J. Babcock, Eric Newcomer, Colin Rigsby, Tim Skipper

No.	Title	Length
1.	"This City Is a Cage"	1:24
2.	"Colors Run"	4:45
3.	"Pioneer"	3:54
4.	"Rat"	3:11
5.	"We Make Our Stars"	4:24
6.	"Feel"	3:20
7.	"God"	4:30
8.	"In the End"	3:54
9.	"Crash (feat. Lauren "Fleurie" Strahm)"	3:00
10.	"Matador"	3:58
11.	"Shots Fired"	2:47
12.	"Get Away"	3:02
13.	"Colors Die Out"	4:42
Total length:		46:51

== Charts ==
Chart (2016)	Peak position
US Top Alternative Albums (Billboard)	14
US Christian Albums (Billboard)	4
US Independent Albums (Billboard)	11
US Top Rock Albums (Billboard)	20
