= House of Heroes =

American alternative rock band

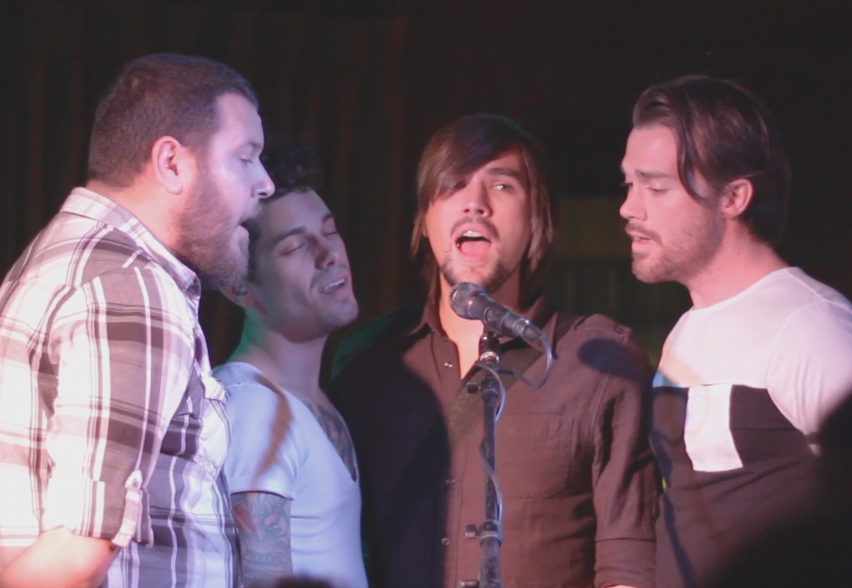
- House of Heroes performing a capella in Akron, Ohio in 2012. Left to right: Eric Newcomer, Colin Rigsby, Tim Skipper, Matt Lott

Background information
- Origin: Columbus, Ohio, U.S.
- Genres: Alternative rock, Christian rock
- Years active: 1998–present
- Labels: Four Door; Vanishing Point; Mono vs Stereo; Gotee; BadChristian
- Members: Tim Skipper; Colin Rigsby; A.J. Babcock; Jared Rigsby; Eric Newcomer

House of Heroes is an American alternative rock band from Columbus, Ohio. They have released six albums: What You Want Is Now (2003), House of Heroes (2005), The End Is Not the End (2008), Suburba (2010), Cold Hard Want (2012), and Colors (2016). The band also released the album Ten Months (2001) under their original name, No Tagbacks, which had more of a punk sound than their releases as House of Heroes. They also re-released their self-titled record under the name of Say No More (2006). The band was last composed of Tim Skipper, Colin Rigsby, A.J. Babcock, Jared Rigsby, and Eric Newcomer.

== History ==
Originally a punk group called Plan B, the band began in 1996 at Hilliard Davidson High School in Hilliard, Ohio, composed of Tim Skipper, A.J. Babcock, and Nate Rothacker on drums. In 1998, Colin Rigsby replaced Nate Rothacker on drums and they changed their name to No Tagbacks, then, later, to House of Heroes, changing their punk style in the process. The band recorded early demos at Chris Lundquist's home studio, LundquistAudio, formerly Lunkhead Studio. In 2003, they released their first album What You Want Is Now under the name House of Heroes.

Jared Rigsby replaced A.J. Babcock as the band's live bassist in December 2005, as Babcock had married and focused on a side project with his wife called FlowerDagger. Babcock eventually rejoined the band as the live bassist and Jared Rigsby became an official member as the band's second guitarist. In 2009, Babcock stopped touring for the second time and was replaced by Eric Newcomer as the live bassist. After Babcock rejoined the band once more in 2012 as bassist, Newcomer became an official member as the band's second guitarist, involved in the writing and recording of Cold Hard Want. After only a brief touring stint in early 2012, Babcock stopped touring again and the band recruited Matt Lott (formerly of Wavorly) as touring bassist. Jared Rigsby did not appear in the band's "In The Studio" video for Cold Hard Want, nor is he featured in the band's press shot on the official page for Cold Hard Want.

Colin Rigsby was temporarily replaced by Josh Dun on drums from March through October 2010, as Rigsby felt he needed to spend more time with his family.

The band became inactive in music and on social media in September 2016, which led many to believe that House of Heroes had broken up. However, in December 2018, they played a ten-year anniversary show for their 2008 album The End Is Not the End. Jared Rigsby rejoined the band and played the entire show, and former touring bassist Matt Lott played on a few songs. The band was also joined onstage by Dun, who played drums during the track "God Save the Foolish Kings". The band played another ten-year anniversary show in 2021, this time for Suburba. The album turned eleven years old in 2021, but the planned 2020 show was delayed because of COVID-19. The band's lineup for the show once again included Jared Rigsby, with Matt Lott playing bass for the encore. The band played a third anniversary show for Cold Hard Want in 2022, once again featuring appearances from Lott and Dun.

== Influences ==
According to drummer, Colin Rigsby, some of House of Heroes influences are The Beatles, Queen, Bruce Springsteen, and The Clash. Tim Skipper also said that Muse is a source of influence. In his free time, Rigsby works on art, and has his own website. He is currently working with Jon Schneck of Relient K on a graphic novel titled "En Carne."

== Christian music ==
Though they are sometimes considered to be Christian rock due to their association with Gotee Records, their lyrics are not always transparently Christian. In an interview with Ransom.tv, Tim Skipper discusses their part in Christian music: "We didn't feel drawn to necessarily be in the church and be a praise and worship band, and we didn't feel drawn to just be outside of it. We kind of felt like we should straddle the line, and the big deal was to keep the integrity of the music intact and not to sacrifice any of the artistry."

In another interview, bassist AJ Babcock said, "We never wanted to try to pander to a Christian audience by saying things that necessarily were just kind of, you know, lip service to people. We never want to do that unless it meant something, unless it was in context in a song." In their fifth album, Suburba, they embrace this idea, with songs such as "Salt in the Sea" and "Constant", which both can be seen as songs with Christian ideas.

In the same interview, Skipper summarizes their role by saying "We're Christian people, and we play rock and roll music."

In an April 2016 interview with BadChristian, Skipper revealed that the band never set out to be a Christian band, and their current stance is that the interpretation is up to the listeners. He also stated that not everybody in House of Heroes is presently a Christian.

== Albums and EPs ==
=== Early releases ===
Ten Months is the only album released under the name No Tagbacks. It was released by Four Door Entertainment.

House of Heroes released their debut album, What You Want Is Now, in 2003 on Vanishing Point Records, owned by Scott Stilletta, formerly of Plankeye. It includes 13 tracks, two of which were later composed differently and released on their self-titled record. It was recorded in Columbus, Ohio. After the release of this album, the band was signed to Gotee Records by its owner and founder, Toby McKeehan. They now release their albums on that label.

Their first album released under Gotee Records was House of Heroes, released on April 26, 2005, includes 11 tracks. During the same year, the group toured with several other bands such as Relient K, Rufio, and MxPx. The band made a music video around this time for their song "Serial Sleepers"

Say No More, was released on May 2, 2006. A re-release of their self-titled debut album, it includes two bonus tracks: "The Invisible Hook" and "You Are the Judas of the Cheerleading Squad".

In 2008, before the release of their next album, the band launched FreeHOH.com, a website where "In the Valley of the Dying Sun", "Sooner or Later", and "By Your Side" were offered as free downloads. The End Is Not the End was subsequently released on September 23, 2008.

The End Is Not the End is really considered the band's breakthrough album, and most epic so far. It charted on the Billboard Christian Albums chart at No. 19 and No. 9 on Heatseekers Albums. "In the Valley of the Dying Sun" was turned into a music video, and was No. 10 on TVU's Most Wanted of 2008. The video was also nominated for a Dove Award in 2009 for Short Form Music Video. "In The Valley of The Dying Sun" was No. 1 on RadioU's 2008's Most Wanted.

The Acoustic End EP was released on April 7, 2009, and includes the songs: "Ghost", "New Moon", and "If (Acoustic)". The title The Acoustic End EP refers to their album title The End Is Not the End.

House of Heroes Meets the Beatles a three-song EP, referring to the Beatles album Meet the Beatles!, was released on June 9, 2009, features "Can't Buy Me Love", "It Won't Be Long" and "Ob-La-Di, Ob-La-Da". The album artwork of this digital EP is set around the Beatles' A Hard Day's Night.

On November 10, 2009, House of Heroes digitally released a three-song EP, for Christmas including a cover of "All I Want for Christmas Is You", "Silent Night", and "O come, O come, Emmanuel".

=== Later releases ===
Their fourth album, Suburba, was released on August 3, 2010, by Gotee Records.

Their fifth album, Cold Hard Want, was produced by Paul Moak and released in 2012 by Gotee Records.

Their final Gotee Records release, House The Knock Down Drag Outs, was mostly a collection of previously released material. The b-sides include songs from House of Heroes Meet the Beatles and The Acoustic End EP, along with bonus tracks from their prior albums.

The EP Smoke was released August 19, 2014. It was the band's first independent release since 2003's "What You Want Is Now".

On June 1, 2016, they released their sixth album, Colors.

== Tours ==
They toured with tobyMac and Brandon Heath in January and February 2011 on the Winter Wonder Slam tour.

== Members ==
Current

- Tim Skipper – lead vocals, guitar (1998–present)
- Colin Rigsby – drums, backing vocals (1998–present)
- A.J. Babcock – bass guitar, backing vocals (1998–present)
- Jared Rigsby – bass guitar, guitar, backing vocals (2005–2011, 2018-present)
- Eric Newcomer – bass guitar, guitar, backing vocals (2009–2011 as live bassist, 2012–present as guitarist)

Former touring musicians

- Josh Dun – drums, backing vocals (2010)
- Matt Lott – bass guitar, backing vocals (2012–2014)

Timeline

== Discography ==
=== Albums ===
Year	Title	Label(s)	Notes
2003	What You Want Is Now	Vanishing Point Records	First full-length album
2005	House of Heroes	Gotee Records	Major label debut album
2008	The End Is Not the End	Gotee Records	Released as mp3s in 2008, released on CD in 2009
2010	Suburba	Gotee Records	
2012	Cold Hard Want	Gotee Records	
2016	Colors	BadChristian Music (distribution)	Independently crowdfunded in 2014

=== Other releases ===
Year	Title	Label(s)	Notes
2001	Ten Months	Four Door Entertainment	As "No Tagbacks"
2006	Say No More	Mono Vs Stereo	Re-release of self-titled album
2009	The Acoustic End EP	Gotee Records	Acoustic versions of "If", "New Moon", and "Ghost".
2009	House of Heroes Meets the Beatles EP	Gotee Records	Covers of "Can't Buy Me Love", "It Won't Be Long", and "Ob-La-Di, Ob-La-Da"
2009	The Christmas Classics EP	Gotee Records	Covers of "All I Want For Christmas Is You" (Mariah Carey), "Silent Night" and "O Come, O Come Emmanuel"
2010	The B-Sides	Gotee Records	Packaged with pre-orders of Suburba
2013	The Knock Down Drag Outs	Gotee Records	Includes songs from previous EPs, bonus tracks from prior albums, and three new songs: "Choose Your Blade," "Hide," and "Your Casualty"
2014	Smoke	Independent	EP with six new songs Independently crowdfunded in 2014
2014	Hark! the House of Heroes Sing	Independent	EP with covers of "O Holy Night" and "God Rest Ye Merry Gentlemen/Joy to the World" as well as one new song "Christmas Morning" Independently crowdfunded in 2014

An early version of the song "You Are the Judas of the Cheerleading Squad", was also featured on a compilation where 25 bands each had one hour to record and mix a song. The album was called 25 Hour Grand Prix.

=== Singles ===
- "Mercedes Baby" (from What You Want Is Now)
- "Kamikaze Baby" (from What You Want Is Now)
- "Serial Sleepers" (from House of Heroes and Say No More) – No. 9 on the Radio & Records Christian Rock Chart
- "Buckets for Bullet Wounds" (from House of Heroes and Say No More) – No. 6 on the Radio & Records Christian Rock Chart
- "The Invisible Hook" (from Say No More)
- "In the Valley of the Dying Sun" (from The End Is Not the End) – No. 1 on the Radio & Records Christian Rock Chart; No. 1 on CWR radio chart
- "Silent Night" (from the digital-only Silent Night single)
- "Lose Control" (from The End Is Not the End) – No. 2 on the Radio & Records Christian Rock Chart; No. 1 on CWR radio chart"
- "Code Name: Raven" (from "The End Is Not the End.")
- "Field of Daggers" (from "The End Is Not the End." Announced on September 3, 2009, on lead singer's, Tim Skipper's Twitter)
- "Elevator" (from Suburba radioU exclusive)
- "Constant" (from Suburba)
- "God Save the Foolish Kings" (from Suburba)
- "Lovesick Zombie" (from the digital-only Lovesick Zombie single)
- "Touch This Light" (from Cold Hard Want)
- "Satisfied" (from Smoke EP)
- "Colors Run" (from COLORS)

=== Music videos ===
- "Ten Months" (2001) as No Tagbacks
- "Vital Signs" (2001) as No Tagbacks
- "Mercedes Baby" (2003)
- "Serial Sleepers" (2005)
- "In the Valley of the Dying Sun" (2008)
- "O Come, O Come Emmanuel" (2009)
- "God Save the Foolish Kings" (2010)
- "So Far Away" (2011)
- "Touch This Light" (2012)

=== Compilation appearances ===
- 2004: "Mercedes Baby", The Revolution Will Begin in the Blink of an Eye Vol. 1 (Mono Vs Stereo)
- 2005: Tim Skipper has been featured in John Reuben's album, "The Boy Vs. the Cynic" on the song "So Glad."
- 2005: "Serial Sleepers", The Revolution Will Begin in the Blink of An Eye Vol. 2 (Mono Vs Stereo)
- 2005: "Serial Sleepers", X2005, (BEC)
- 2006: "The Invisible Hook", X2007 (BEC)
- 2006: "Day by Day", Freaked! A Gotee Tribute to dcTalk's "Jesus Freak" (Gotee)
- 2009: Tim Skipper contributed vocals on the songs "Forget and Not Slow Down" and "Sahara" and "Savannah" from Relient K's Forget and Not Slow Down

== No Tagbacks ==
The band was known as "No Tagbacks" before they were House of Heroes.

Members

- Tim Skipper – lead vocals, guitar
- AJ Babcock – bass guitar, backing vocals
- Colin Rigsby – drums, backing vocals

Discography

- Ten Months (2001)

Music videos

- "Ten Months" (2001)
- "Vital Signs" (2001)
