= Mike Furrey =

American football player and coach (born 1977)

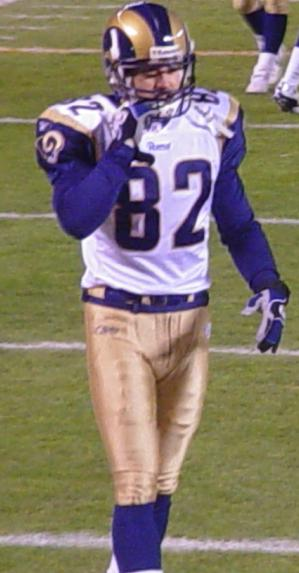
- Furrey with the St. Louis Rams in 2003

South Carolina Gamecocks
- Title: Wide receivers coach

Personal information
- Born: March 12, 1977 (age 49); Galion, Ohio, U.S.
- Listed height: 6 ft 0 in (1.83 m)
- Listed weight: 192 lb (87 kg)

Career information
- Positions: Wide receiver, safety (No. 82, 25, 87, 88)
- High school: Hilliard Davidson (Hilliard, Ohio)
- College: Ohio State (1995), Northern Iowa (1996–1999)
- NFL draft: 2000: undrafted

Career history

Playing
- Indianapolis Colts (2000)*; Las Vegas Outlaws (2001); New York Dragons (2002); New York Jets (2002)*; New York Dragons (2003); St. Louis Rams (2003–2005); Detroit Lions (2006–2008); Cleveland Browns (2009); Washington Redskins (2010)
- * Offseason or practice squad member only

Coaching
- Kentucky Christian (2011–2012) Head coach; Marshall (2013–2015) Wide receivers coach; Limestone (2016–2017) Head coach; Chicago Bears (2018–2021) Wide receivers coach; Limestone (2022–2023) Head coach; South Carolina (2024–present) Wide receivers coach

Awards and highlights
- Second-team All-Arena (2002)

Career NFL statistics
- Receptions: 221
- Receiving yards: 2,298
- Receiving touchdowns: 7
- Stats at Pro Football Reference

Head coaching record
- Regular season: 33–32 (.508)
- Postseason: 0–2 (.000)
- Career: 33–34 (.493)
- Stats at ArenaFan.com

Michael Thomas Furrey (/ˈfɜːri/; born May 12, 1977) is an American college football coach and former professional wide receiver and safety. He is the wide receivers coach for the University of South Carolina, a position he has held since 2024. He was the head football coach for Kentucky Christian University from 2010 to 2012. He was the head football coach for Limestone University from 2016 to 2017 and from 2022 to 2023. He was signed by the Indianapolis Colts of the National Football League (NFL) as an undrafted free agent following the 2000 NFL draft. He played college football at Northern Iowa and Ohio State University.

Furrey was also a member of the New York Dragons, Las Vegas Outlaws, St. Louis Rams, Detroit Lions, Cleveland Browns, and Washington Redskins.

== Early life ==
Furrey attended Hilliard Davidson High School in Hilliard, Ohio, and was a letter-winner in football, basketball, and baseball. In football, as a senior, he was a first-team All-District honoree a first-team All-Conference honoree, and a first-team All-Ohio honoree.

== College career ==
After high school, Furrey enrolled at Ohio State University in 1995, where he played in nine games as a freshman walk-on. In 1996, he transferred to Division I-AA Northern Iowa. In his three years at UNI, Furrey set new Gateway Football Conference receiving records with career totals of 242 receptions for 3,544 yards and 27 touchdowns.

== Professional career ==
Pre-draft measurables
Height	Weight
5 ft 11 3/4 in (1.82 m)	180 lb (82 kg)
Values from Pro Day

=== Indianapolis Colts ===
He entered the NFL as an undrafted free agent for the Indianapolis Colts in 2000 but was waived at the end of training camp.

=== Las Vegas Outlaws ===
He went on to play in the XFL for the Las Vegas Outlaws. He finished the season with 18 receptions for 243 yards and one touchdown.

=== New York Dragons ===
Furrey played for the New York Dragons in 2002 and 2003 as a wide receiver/defensive back. He was leading the Arena Football League in receptions (108), receiving yards (1,574), receiving touchdowns (46, tying an AFL record for touchdowns in a single season), and points (288) when he left the Dragons on April 29, 2003, to sign with the St. Louis Rams of the National Football League.

=== St. Louis Rams ===
Furrey made the 2003 Rams roster and played in 13 games, serving as wide receiver and special teams ace. He played in eight games and two playoff contests in 2004. Due to a lack of depth in the Rams' secondary before the 2005 season, Furrey converted to free safety based on his experience in the AFL, where players play both offense and defense. He became the starter in Week 5. He was successful in the transition, as he had one game-winning interception 67-yard return for a touchdown, and the next week a game-clinching interception in the closing minutes of the fourth quarter. At the end of the 2005 season, Furrey was released.

=== Detroit Lions ===
The Detroit Lions signed Furrey to a one-year deal on April 4, 2006, as a wide receiver, being one of the few active players in the NFL to have started on both offense and defense. He emerged as a solid option in the Lions offense, catching 98 passes for 1,086 yards and six touchdowns. His 98 receptions for that season were the most for any player in the conference, and second best in the league.

On December 31, 2006, Furrey set the pro football record for most catches for a non-rookie after a season with no catches the previous season. He had 98 receptions at the end of the 2006 season (which was the most in the NFC for that year), after none in 2005. The previous record was 92 catches, set in 1960 by Lionel Taylor, playing for Denver in the AFL.

Furrey was the 2006 recipient of the Detroit Lions/Detroit Sports Broadcasters Association/Pro Football Writers Association's Media-Friendly "Good Guy" Award. The Good Guy Award is given yearly to the Detroit Lions player who shows consideration to, and cooperation with the media at all times during the course of the season.

After the 2006 season, Furrey was re-signed by the Lions to a three-year contract due to his breakout year. In the 2007 NFL draft the Lions selected wide receiver Calvin Johnson in the first round (2nd overall), making Furrey number three on the depth chart. Furrey recorded 61 catches for 664 yards in 2007. He was re-signed as an unrestricted free agent on January 24, 2007. Furrey was released by the Lions on February 9, 2009.

=== Cleveland Browns ===
Furrey was signed by the Cleveland Browns on May 5, 2009. Furrey started the year at wide receiver for the Browns, but was moved to free safety and nickelback due to the lack of depth in Cleveland's injury-depleted secondary. In 2010, he was one of three finalists for the Walter Payton Man of the Year Award, which Brian Waters ultimately won. He was also the Browns' 2009 Ed Block Courage Award Recipient.

=== Washington Redskins ===
Furrey was signed by the Washington Redskins on June 9, 2010.

== NFL career statistics ==
Legend
**Bold**	Career high

=== Regular season ===
Year	Team	Games		Receiving					
Year	Team	GP	GS	Tgt	Rec	Yds	Avg	Lng	TD
2003	STL	13	0	33	20	189	9.5	24	0
2004	STL	8	0	3	1	8	8.0	8	0
2005	STL	16	11	0	0	0	0.0	0	0
2006	DET	16	14	**146**	**98**	**1,086**	**11.1**	31	**6**
2007	DET	16	10	91	61	664	10.9	**49**	1
2008	DET	9	2	35	18	181	10.1	25	0
2009	CLE	16	4	39	23	170	7.4	22	0
		94	41	347	221	2,298	10.4	49	7

=== Postseason ===
Year	Team	Games		Receiving					
Year	Team	GP	GS	Tgt	Rec	Yds	Avg	Lng	TD
2003	STL	1	0	**5**	**4**	**30**	**7.5**	**10**	0
2004	STL	2	0	0	0	0	0.0	0	0
		3	0	5	4	30	7.5	10	0

=== After football ===
In August 2011, it was announced Furrey was one of a number of former NFL players suing the NFL over concussions and related symptoms.

== Coaching career ==
On December 10, 2010, Furrey was introduced as the head football coach at Kentucky Christian University in Grayson, Kentucky. KCU plays in the Mid-South Conference of the National Association of Intercollegiate Athletics (NAIA). On February 20, 2013, Furrey resigned his position as KCU head coach to become wide receivers coach at Marshall University. On May 10, 2016, it was reported that Furrey would be leaving Marshall University to become the head coach at Limestone College. On May 12, 2016, Furrey was introduced at Limestone College in Gaffney, South Carolina at a press conference. He became the second head coach for football for the Limestone Saints, compiling a 9–12 record in two seasons with the team.

Furrey joined the Chicago Bears as their wide receivers coach on January 12, 2018, reuniting with New York Dragons teammate and new Bears head coach Matt Nagy. Following Nagy's firing after the 2021 season, Furrey was not retained by the team.

On February 29, 2024, Furrey was named the wide receivers coach at the University of South Carolina.

== Head coaching record ==
Year	Team	Overall	Conference	Standing	Bowl/playoffs
**Kentucky Christian Knights** (Mid-South Conference) (2011–2012)
2011	Kentucky Christian	4–7	2–3	4th (East)	
2012	Kentucky Christian	4–7	1–4	T–4th (East)	
Kentucky Christian:		8–14	3–7		
**Limestone Saints** (NCAA Division II independent) (2016)
2016	Limestone	5–6			
**Limestone Saints** (South Atlantic Conference) (2017)
2017	Limestone	4–6	3–4	T–4th	
**Limestone Saints** (South Atlantic Conference) (2022–2023)
2022	Limestone	8–4	7–2	T–1st (Piedmont)	**L** NCAA Division II First Round
2023	Limestone	8–4	7–1	T–1st (Piedmont)	**L** NCAA Division II First Round
Limestone:		25–20	17–7		
Total:		33–34			
National championship Conference title Conference division title or championship game berth
