= Hilliard United Methodist Church =

- Hilliard Methodist Episcopal Church
- U.S. National Register of Historic Places
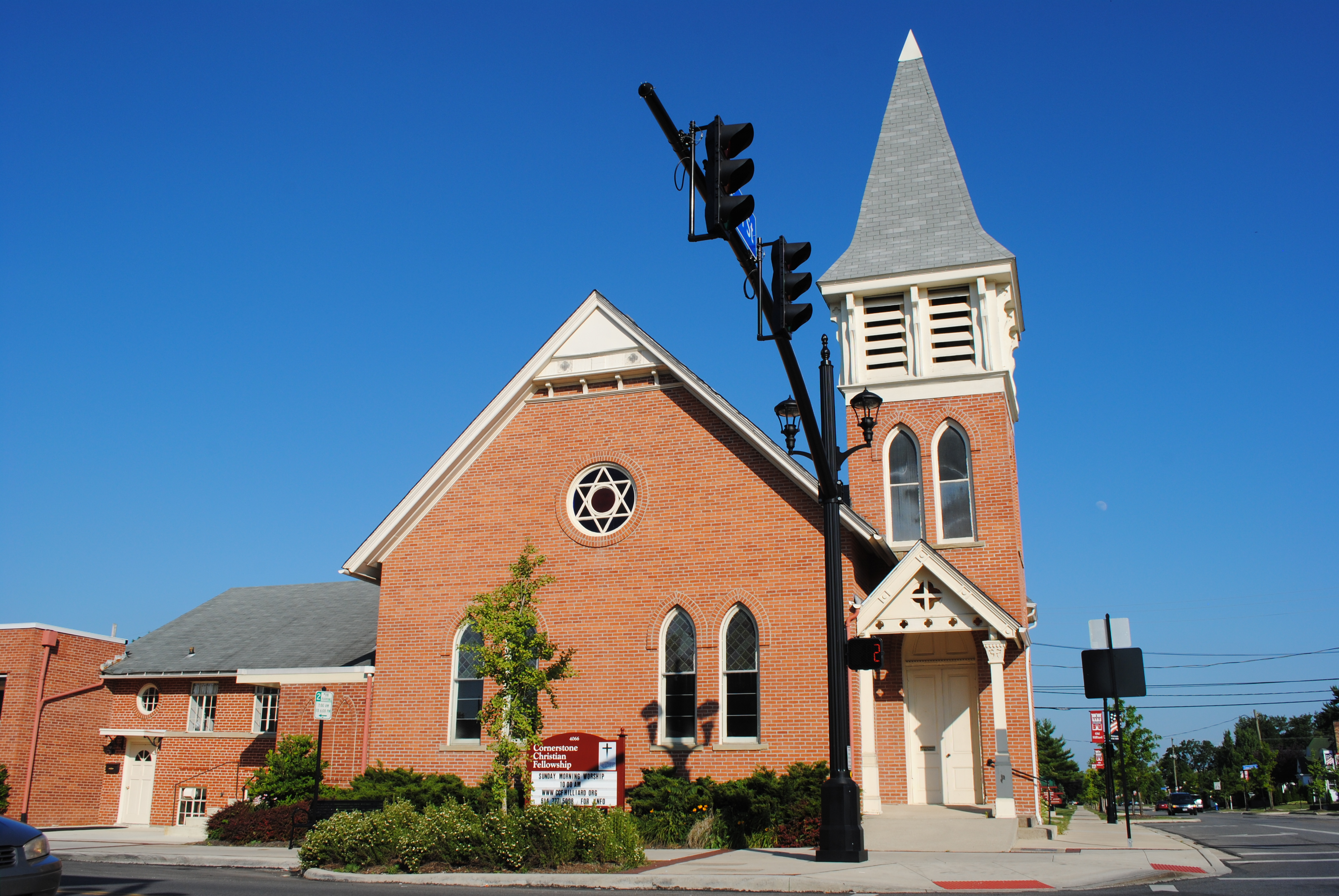
- Front

- Location within Ohio Location within the United States
- Location: 4066 Main St., Hilliard, Ohio
- Coordinates: 40°2′5″N 83°9′30″W
- Area: Less than 1 acre (0.40 ha)
- Built: 1883
- Architectural style: Gothic Revival
- NRHP reference No.: 88000634
- Added to NRHP: August 4, 1988

The Hilliard United Methodist Church is a historic Methodist church in central Hilliard, Ohio, United States. The oldest religious structure in the community, it has been named a historic site.

Hilliard's Methodist Episcopal congregation built the present structure in 1883. At the time, Hilliard was a small village, consisting of just the center of the present community; as the community has grown into a suburb within the Columbus metropolitan area, all other nineteenth-century church buildings have perished, but the Methodist church has endured and become a significant component of residents' sense of community identity.

Built of brick, the church rests on a foundation of limestone and is covered with an asphalt roof, and some exterior elements are made of wood and sandstone. The building's basic form is a simple gable-front structure, but a tall bell tower stands to one side of the main section. Due to elements such as a steep hip roof, ornamental brackets, and large louvers protecting the belfry, the square tower is the most prominent component of the overall design. Worshippers enter the building through the base of the tower, using a doorway with a small gabled porch. Behind the tower, the side of the building is extended with an ell that approaches the streetside. Gothic windows are set on the ground floor in the facade, bell tower, and ell, while a circular window crowns the front gable and additional Gothic windows pierce the second story of the tower.

In 1988, the Hilliard United Methodist Church was listed on the National Register of Historic Places, qualifying because of its historically significant architecture, as the original Gothic Revival elements are still present. It remains in use as a house of worship for the congregation that built it.
