= Hilliard Darby High School =

Location
- 4200 Leppert Road; Hilliard, Ohio 43026; United States; 40°2′7″N 83°10′5″W

Information
- Type: Public, coeducational high school
- Opened: 1997
- School district: Hilliard City Schools
- Superintendent: David Stewart
- Principal: Matt Middleton
- Staff: 97.32 (FTE)
- Grades: 9-12
- Enrollment: 1,634 (2023-2024)
- Student to teacher ratio: 16.79
- Colors: Black, Carolina blue
- Athletics conference: Ohio Capital Conference
- Nickname: Panthers
- Rivals: Hilliard Davidson High School, Hilliard Bradley High School
- USNWR ranking: 45 of 1,453 Ohio high schools
- Website: School website
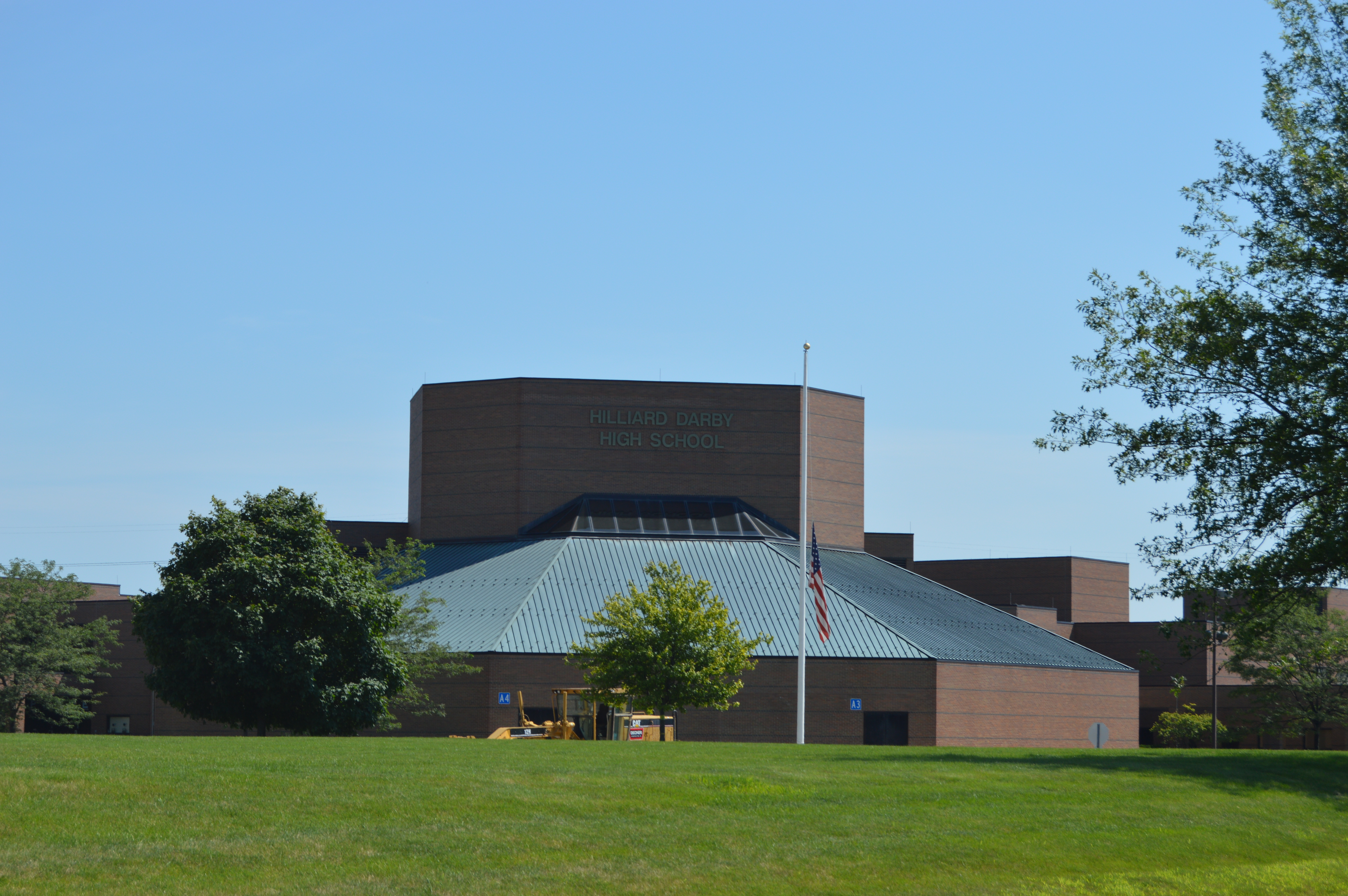

Hilliard Darby High School is the second high school in the Hilliard City School District in Hilliard, Ohio, United States. It is one of three high schools in the district, along with Hilliard Davidson High School and Hilliard Bradley High School. The school is located at 4200 Leppert Road, just north of Hilliard Heritage Middle School. Its mascot is the Panther and the school's colors are Carolina blue, black, and white.

The current principal is Matt Midleton. Previous principals include Jeffrey R. Reinhard, David J. Stewart, Ryan McClure, and Joyce Brickley. Stewart moved to Hilliard Bradley High School upon its opening, and is now the superintendent for the Hilliard City School District. Former principal Joyce Brickley moved to Hilliard Davidson High School to fill in for Aaron Cookson.

Darby opened in the 1997–1998 school year, and despite a reputed capacity of 1,900, it held over 2,200 students during the 2008–2009 school year. The enrollment is once again below capacity due to the opening of Bradley, the district's third high school, in the fall of 2009.

== Athletics ==
=== State championships ===
- Softball - 2000

==== Other Non-Sanctioned State Championships ====
- Boys' volleyball - 2013, 2015

== Notable alumni ==
- Jeremy Ebert, retired wide receiver of the NFL
- Blake Horvath, college football quarterback for the Navy Midshipmen
- Taylor Price, wide receiver for the Seattle Seahawks of the NFL
- Cory Michael Smith, actor, star of the HBO miniseries Olive Kitteridge and the FOX series Gotham
- Ethan Tracy, professional golfer

== See also ==
- Hilliard City School District
- Hilliard Memorial Middle School
- Hilliard Weaver Middle School
- Hilliard Heritage Middle School
