= Cold Hard Want =

Studio album by House of Heroes
- Released: July 10, 2012
- Recorded: The Smoakstack in Nashville, TN
- Genre: Alternative rock, indie rock
- Length: 46:55
- Label: Gotee
- Producer: Paul Moak

House of Heroes chronology
Suburba (2010)	Cold Hard Want (2012)	Colors (2016)

Cold Hard Want is the fifth full-length album by alternative rock band House of Heroes. It was released on Gotee Records on July 10, 2012. House of Heroes entered Smoakstack Studios on December 12, 2011 in order to record Cold Hard Want. The band went with producer Paul Moak, who has produced artists such as Seabird, Lovedrug, Mat Kearney, after going with producer Mark Lee Townsend for the previous two albums. As of February 22, 2012, the record has been completely recorded and mastered.

== Release ==
On their Tumblr page, the band announced that the album would be out on July 10, 2012, and that they would release their first single, "Touch This Light", its music video, and a B-Side called "Dead" on April 24, 2012. On May 7, 2012, another song from the album, "Comfort Trap", was accidentally leaked by producer Paul Moak. The link was quickly pulled after only a handful of people were able to access the song., On May 15, 2012, five preorder bundles were made available on Gotee Records' online store, featuring limited edition CDs and vinyl presses. Every day from June 12, 2012 until June 22, 2012, the band updated http://coldhardwant.com to include a new song clip, and on some days, special downloads. These downloads included ringtones and handwritten guitar chords. Starting June 25 and ending July 6, the band once again updated the site every weekday, but this time with full lyric videos for each major song on the album (excluding the a capella intro and "outro"). On July 10, 2012, the album was made available digitally through iTunes, AmazonMP3, and Google Play, and in hard copy through major retailers such as Best Buy and Amazon.

== Critical reception ==
Professional ratings
Review scores
Source	Rating
AllMusic	3.5/5 stars
Alt Rock Live	9/10 stars
CCM Magazine	4/5 stars
CHRISTCORE	4.5/5 stars
Christian Music Zine	4.5/5 stars
CM Addict	5/5 stars
Cross Rhythms	9/10 stars
Decoy Music	4.5/5 stars
Indie Vision Music	4/5 stars
Jesus Freak Hideout	4.5/5 stars
Louder Than the Music	4/5 stars
Muzik Dizcovery	B−
New Release Tuesday	5/5 stars 4/5 stars
The NewReview	5/5 stars
Sputnikmusic	4/5 stars

AllMusic's Chrysta Cherrie wrote that "Wrapping their messages in energized, empowering punk-pop and hard rock hooks, Cold Hard Want is as much a reflection of House of Heroes' overall sound and ethos as it is the natural next step in their evolution."

Alt Rock Live's Jonathan Faulkner wrote that "All in all this is a solid album all the way around by House of Heroes. Cold Hard Want will establish them as one of Christian Music's top bands and will defiantly draw in new fans."

CCM Magazine's Andy Argyrakis wrote that this album is "yet another notch and showcasing the vast musical spectrum that continues to flank the foursome."

CHRISTCORE's Brian Morrissette wrote that "The album isn't their best yet, but it is pretty darn good. It is in contention for album of the year, in my opinion. While I do miss the concept album design they have employed in the past, a straight-up record from them is nice."

Christian Music Zine's Megan Missler wrote that "If I had to sum up this album in one word it would be "raw." The vocals, instrumentation, lyrics, emotion, feel, vibe, it's all raw...Cold Hard Want does not disappoint musically."

CM Addict's Kevin Thorson wrote that the album "is a flawless release."

Cross Rhythms' Gareth Hills wrote that "It's rare to find a band that are as creative lyrically as they are musically, and 'Cold Heart Want' shows that this band most definitely tick both of these boxes. Thoroughly recommended."

Decoy Music's Nick Senior wrote that "House of Heroes has certainly delivered with Cold Hard Want. In fact, the most significant complaint to be found on the album is the album title is a bit lame. However, the music and the passion these Ohioans exude on the album is anything but lame. Alternative rock may not need a group of heroes, but it may have found a candidate here."

Indie Vision Music's Josh Hamm wrote that "Cold Hard Want is another classic House of Heroes album that feels like an old favourite but still manages to show how their diversity and ability to create great music within their genre while experimenting and being true to themselves. The combination of top notch production, catchy melodies, beautiful harmonies, breathtaking musicianship and the amazing voice of Tim Skipper is more than enough to impress anyone from an old fan to a first time listener. This will stand as one of the best albums of 2012."

Jesus Freak Hideout's Josh Taylor wrote that "When it comes to a band like House of Heroes, with a discography as impressive as theirs, it is hard to give each new album a fair shake without comparing it to all of its predecessors. With that said, Cold Hard Want is, without a doubt, one of their two greatest pieces of work. Suburba was a great album in its own right, but this one feels like the true successor to The End Is Not the End. It takes all the best parts of Suburba, and brings back everything that made The End... the masterpiece that it was. Does this make Cold Hard Want their best work to date? Whether it is or not, that doesn't change the fact that this is the best album of 2012, hands down."

Jesus Freak Hideout's Kevin Chamberlin wrote that "House of Heroes is a diamond in the rough in Christian music. ... Combining HOH nostalgia with heavier, edgier and more anthemic musical pieces, they may have set the bar higher than any of their previous records."

Louder Than the Music's Jono Davies wrote that "This band sounds like a mix between Muse and Switchfoot and fans of those bands will enjoy checking theses guys out. Cold Hard Want is a real rock kind of album with some great tunes that will leave the listener wanting more."

Muzik Dizcovery's Erik van Rheenen wrote that "If this was House of Heroes swing for alternative radio stardom, they just took a big swing and a miss at a pitch way outside the strike zone. Fans probably weren't looking for Suburba, Part 2, but for anyone who cracked a smile at House of Heroes boldly waving the goofy pop-rock banner, Cold Hard Want is a cold, hard disappointment."

New Release Tuesday's Kevin Davis wrote that "Cold Hard Want is House of Heroes' most urgent, most tangible, most undeniable artifact in their marked career. Hands down. Known for their creativity, House of Heroes has always taken pride in their ability to blend the experimental and the quirky into hooky, classic-rock-influenced anthems. But with Cold Hard Want, the band has taken the gloves off. Every song has an unavoidable, magnetic chorus. Every moment is desperate. Every track is modern rock, that is hopelessly candid—in the best possible way—complete with bombastic beats, shredding leads, and triumphant riffs. Make no mistake about one thing, however: House of Heroes has not placed their hopes on the fickle fortunes of rock n’ roll. These four realize the fate of their souls cannot be hinged on something so mortal. Faith is—and always has been—the crux of their creation."

New Release Tuesday's Jonathan Francesco wrote that "Now, the band offers Cold Hard Want, and as is the case with most bands who put out career-defining albums, it'll immediately be weighed against its predecessors. I feel it's unfair to stack everything the band does against their 'best' album. Cold Hard Want can stand on its own merits, even if it may not be the defining release of the band's career."

The NewReview's Jonathan Anderson wrote that "Time will tell if Cold Hard Want surpasses their previous efforts, but from where I’m standing, that is a distinct possibility."

Sputnikmusic's Davey Boy wrote that "Naturally, comparisons and rankings will still be made as to where 'Cold Hard Want' fits into the catalog of House of Heroes releases. Maybe more significant is the fact that it does indeed fit in nicely, since it feels like both a natural evolution for the band, as well as a summation of their career to date. In a sense, it somewhat mirrors the "living responsibly and conscientiously to die proudly" motif in that House of Heroes perform this album with such a passion, craft and proficiency, that no matter which direction they head next, this talented outfit will be able to look back upon 'Cold Hard Want' with nothing but pride."

== Track listing ==
All tracks are written by A.J. Babcock, Eric Newcomer, Colin Rigsby, Tim Skipper.

No.	Title	Length
1.	"A Man Who's Not Afraid"	1:03
2.	"Out My Way"	3:36
3.	"Dance (Blow It All Away)"	3:34
4.	"Remember the Empire"	4:28
5.	"We Were Giants"	3:47
6.	"The Cop"	3:07
7.	"Comfort Trap"	4:20
8.	"Touch This Light"	4:23
9.	"Angels of Night"	5:08
10.	"Stay"	3:58
11.	"Suspect"	4:03
12.	"Curtains"	0:40
13.	"I Am a Symbol"	4:48
Total length:		46:55

== Charts ==
=== Album ===
Chart (2011)	Peak position
US Billboard 200	73
US Billboard Christian Albums	3
US Billboard Rock Albums	24

== Singles ==
- "Touch This Light"
- "Remember the Empire"

== Music videos ==
- "Touch This Light"
