= Hilliard Davidson High School =

Location
- 5100 Davidson Road; Hilliard, Ohio 43026; United States; 40°2′59″N 83°9′25″W

Information
- Type: Public, Coeducational high school
- Opened: 1956 (Relocated to current building in 1989)
- Status: open
- School district: Hilliard City Schools
- Superintendent: David Stewart
- Principal: William Ragland
- Teaching staff: 100.53 (on a FTE basis)
- Grades: 9-12
- Enrollment: 1,944 (2023-2024)
- Student to teacher ratio: 19.34
- Colors: Royal blue and White
- Athletics conference: Ohio Capital Conference
- Nickname: Wildcats
- Rivals: Hilliard Darby High School, Hilliard Bradley High School
- Accreditation: North Central Association of Colleges and Schools
- Website: www.hilliardschools.org/hdv/
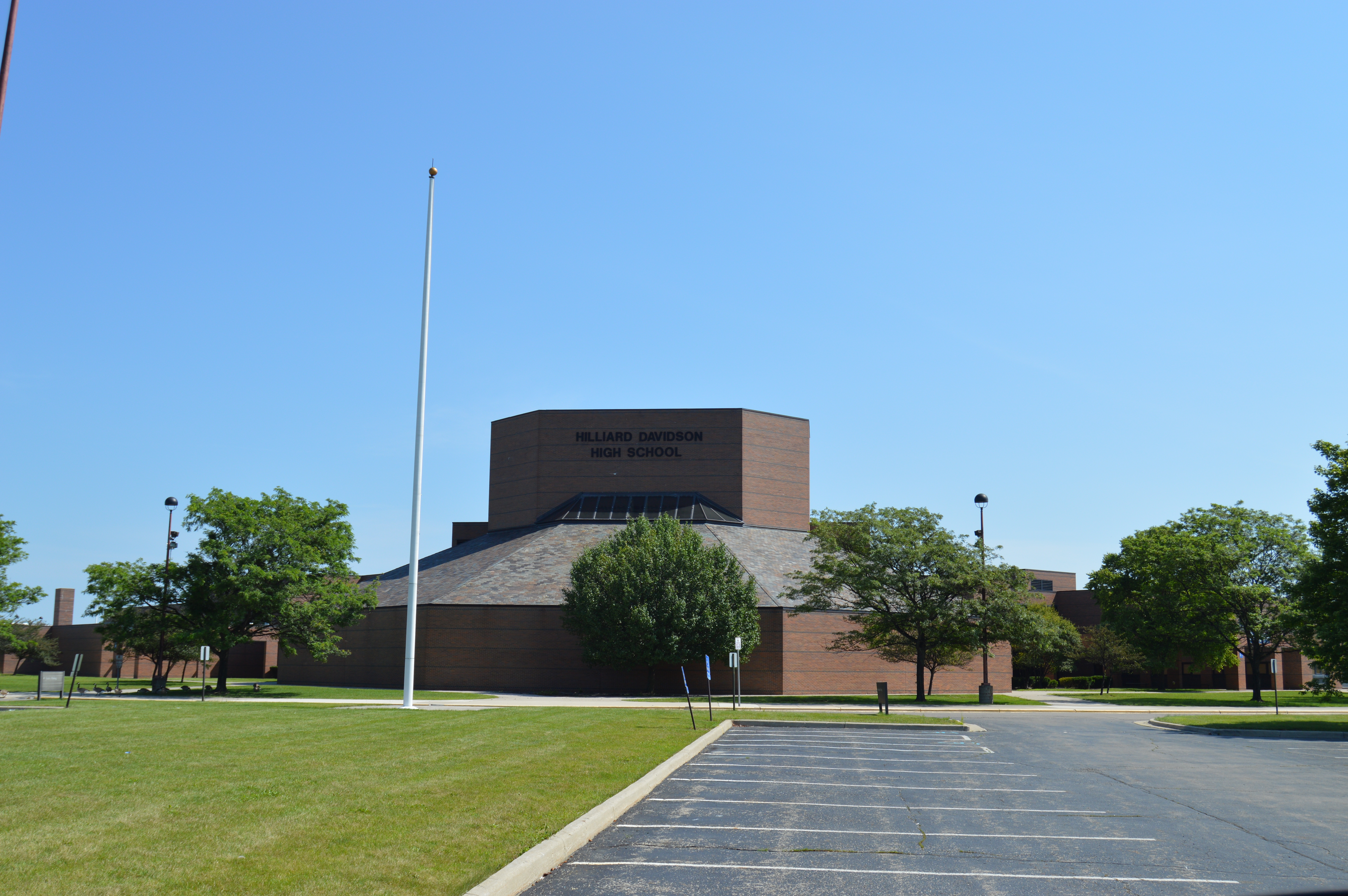

Hilliard Davidson High School is a public high school in the Hilliard City School District in Hilliard, Ohio, a suburb of Columbus, Ohio. It is the first of three high schools in the district, the other two being Hilliard Darby High School and Hilliard Bradley High School. The school is located at 5100 Davidson Road, just north of Hilliard Weaver Middle School. The mascot is the Wildcat, and the school's colors are royal blue and white.

Hilliard Davidson High School was originally called Hilliard High School. It was renamed in 1997 when Hilliard Darby High School opened.

== Academics ==
Davidson offers Advanced Placement (AP) courses, as well as honors courses. The Advanced Placement courses are weighted into students' GPAs accordingly.

=== Online education ===
Hilliard Davidson has an e-campus system, to each his own on which students can take several classes that are offered by the district online. Hilliard Davidson also makes use of independent online study programs from Brigham Young University and Indiana University.

== Music ==
The music department at Davidson includes band, orchestra, and choir.

The choirs consist of concert and symphonic, with the top choir being senior choir. Alongside that Davidson’s a cappella group is known as “madrigals” or “BKOTB”. “BKOTB” is short for “Blue Kids On The Block”.

Their bands consist of 3 (Highest to Lowest); Concert Band, Symphonic Winds, and Wind Symphony.

== Theatre ==
The theatre program at Hilliard Davidson has been on the receiving end of several awards and accolades. The school's theatre troupe has also taken part in several national and international programs.

=== Kennedy Center Award ===
In 1999, Hilliard Davidson High School received the Creative Ticket National School of Distinction Award from the Kennedy Center. It was awarded to the theatre program through the Kennedy Center Alliance for Arts Education. Hilliard Davidson's application video for this award may be viewed on YouTube. A documentary video of the school's trip to the Kennedy Center in Washington, D.C. may also be found on YouTube. A "Golden Ticket" plaque may be found in the high school's lobby.

=== Educational Theatre Association Hall of Fame ===
Hilliard Davidson High School and its theatre faculty has received several awards from the Ohio Educational Theatre Association and The Educational Theatre Association. Hilliard High School has twice been named an Outstanding Theatre School by ETA in 1996 and 2000. This honor is given to schools theatre programs that work to produce quality theatre. Additionally, drama director Robin Brenneman was inducted into the Ohio Educational Theatre Association's Hall of Fame in 2012. It is bestowed upon individuals who have devoted themselves to promoting educational theatre and who have given 20 years or more to said cause. Technical Director Diana Evans Vance was also inducted into the Ohio Educational Theatre Association's Hall of Fame in 2013, as well as receiving recognition by receiving Columbus Theatre Roundtable's People Who Make a Difference award, Ohio Theatre Alliance's Lifetime Achievement Award and the Educational Theatre Association's Hall of Fame award in 1996.

=== Edinburgh Fringe Festival ===
In the summer of 2007, Hilliard Davidson High School attended the Edinburgh Fringe Festival through the American High School Theatre Festival. The Edinburgh Fringe is an international festival featuring performances from an enormous variety of groups and performers. Davidson brought their production of School House Rock to the Fringe Festival, performing in Blueside Venue 103. The production was detailed in the Edinburgh Fringe program. Hilliard Davidson's 2002 application video may be found on YouTube. Their 2003 application video may also be found on YouTube. Additionally, Hilliard Davidson was invited to the Edinburgh Fringe Festival for the summers of 1998, 2010, and 2014.

== Ohio High School Athletic Association state championships ==
- Boys' Cross Country – 2002
- Girls' Cross Country – 2002
- Football – 2006, 2009
- Boys' Soccer – 2007
- Girls Track & Field - 2025

== Notable alumni ==
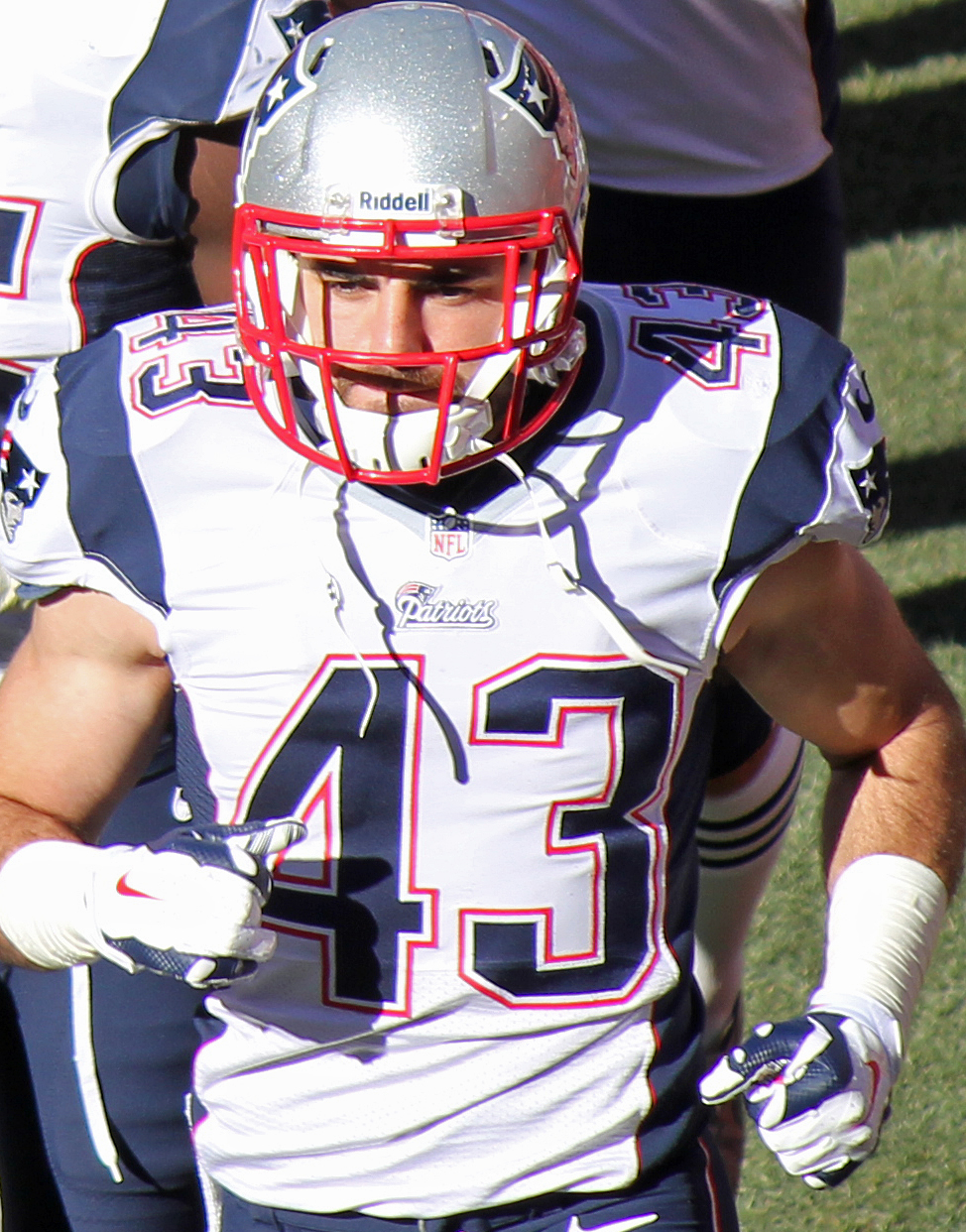
Nate Ebner

- Markus Bailey - National Football League linebacker, Arizona Cardinals
- Alexa Bliss - professional wrestler, World Wrestling Entertainment
- Nate Ebner – safety for the New York Giants of the National Football League and rugby Olympian
- Josiah Ezirim - National Football League offensive tackle, New Orleans Saints
- Mike Furrey – wide receiver coach, South Carolina
- John Konesky – lead electric guitar, Tenacious D
- Tim Skipper – lead singer, House of Heroes
- Nick Uhas - an American TV host, actor and YouTuber
