= The End Is Not the End (House of Heroes album) =

Studio album by House of Heroes
- Released: September 23, 2008
- Studios: s-s-Studio, Spring Hill, Tennessee, The Sound Kitchen, Franklin, Tennessee
- Genres: Alternative rock, Christian rock
- Length: 58:03
- Labels: Mono vs Stereo, Gotee
- Producer: Mark Lee Townsend

House of Heroes chronology
Say No More (2006)	The End Is Not the End (2008)	Suburba (2010)

The End Is Not the End is the third full-length album by the American alternative rock band House of Heroes. It was released September 23, 2008. After touring for their album, Say No More, the band announced on their MySpace page that they were working on new material. They posted pictures of themselves recording in a studio with supposed ex-member, A.J. Babcock. The band clarified that Babcock is recording vocals and is still contributing musically to the band. Babcock is now listed as the bassist and Jared Rigsby is now listed as a guitarist.

The band released a sampler on their MySpace of 15 short clips of every song on The End is Not the End. The band released the songs "Code Name Raven", "Leave You Now" and "Lose Control". The band has also released free tracks, via www.freehoh.com, which includes "By Your Side", "In the Valley of the Dying Sun", and "Sooner or Later". The band revealed the official track list and cover art on Zambooie.com when the band made their CD available for pre-order.

== Release ==
The official release date of The End is Not the End was September 23, 2008. Due to distribution issues, the album was only available on iTunes and at live shows at the time. The album is now available on most retailers websites, just not in the actual store. The "online"-store bought version includes two bonus tracks titled "New Moon", and "Ghost." Both of those songs are also on their digital EP The Acoustic End EP.

== Reception ==
Professional ratings
Review scores
Source	Rating
Christianity Today	4.5/5 stars
Indie Vision Music	(9.5/10)
Jesus Freak Hideout	5/5 stars
Sputnikmusic	3.5/5 stars

The End Is Not the End has been very well received by critics. SputnikMusic.com rated it five stars, saying "There is hardly any band out there who is daring enough to make an album quite as grandiose as this, and only one in my book who could ever succeed." Jesus Freak Hideout also rated it five stars, saying, "Look for it on a lot of industry top tens at year's end. But you heard it here first . . . The End Is Not the End is easily the best record of 2008." In an unrated review for AllMusic, Paula Carino wrote that the release finds "the emo band cleaning up their production, beefing up their riffs, and at the same time creating more depth and nuance in their writing" and later stating that it reflects an "admirable creative evolution, and promising untold growth in the future."

== Track listing ==
=== 2008 release ===
1. "Intro" – 0:32
  - Stringed-instrument part of the instrumental interlude in "Baby's a Red"
2. "If" – 3:15
3. "Lose Control" – 3:47
4. "Leave You Now" – 3:02
5. "Dangerous" – 3:46
6. "In the Valley of the Dying Sun" – 4:33
7. "Code Name: Raven" – 4:10
8. "By Your Side" – 3:44
9. "Journey into Space (Part One)" – 4:00
10. "Sooner or Later" – 3:43
11. "Baby's a Red" – 3:38
12. "Drown" – 3:07
13. "Faces" – 3:23
14. "Voices" – 4:31
15. "Field of Daggers" – 5:27
16. "The Young and the Brutal" – 2:46

=== 2009 CD release ===
1. "Intro" – 0:32
  - Stringed-instrument part of the instrumental interlude in "Baby's a Red"
2. "If" – 3:15
3. "Lose Control" – 3:47
4. "Leave You Now" – 3:02
5. "Dangerous" – 3:46
6. "In the Valley of the Dying Sun" – 4:33
7. "Code Name: Raven" – 4:10
8. "By Your Side" – 3:44
9. "Journey into Space (Part One)" – 4:00
10. "Sooner or Later" – 3:43
11. "Baby's a Red" – 3:38
12. "Drown" – 3:07
13. "Faces" – 3:23
14. "Voices" – 4:31
15. "Field of Daggers" – 8:44
16. "New Moon" – 3:40
17. "Ghost" – 4:42
