= Hilliard, Ohio =

- City
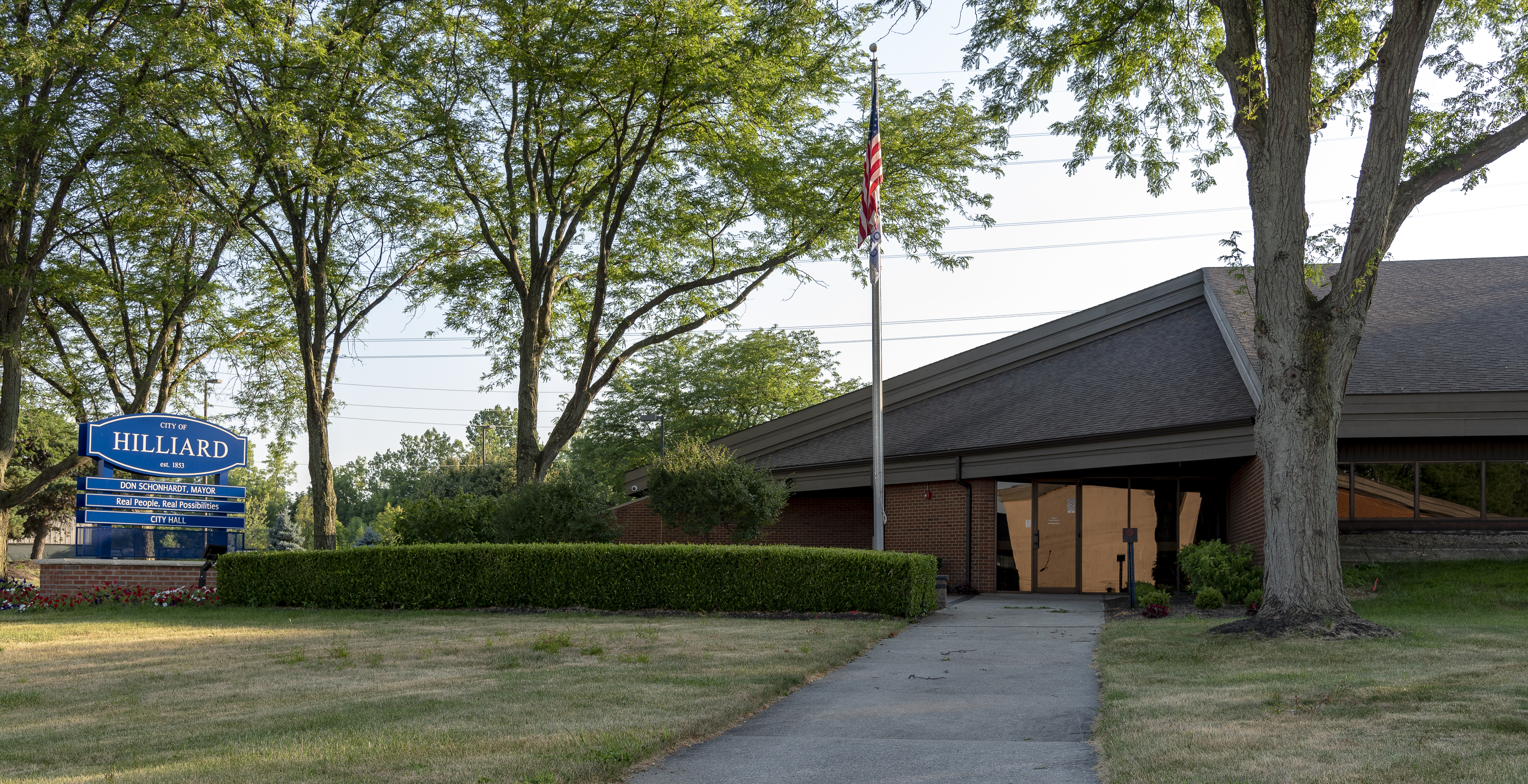
- Hilliard City Hall

- Flag Logo
- Interactive map of Hilliard, Ohio
- Location within Ohio Location within the United States
- Coordinates: 40°02′12″N 83°08′40″W
- Country: United States
- State: Ohio
- County: Franklin

Area
  - Total: 14.45 sq mi (37.42 km^{2})
  - Land: 14.27 sq mi (36.96 km^{2})
  - Water: 0.18 sq mi (0.46 km^{2})
- Elevation: 932 ft (284 m)

Population (2020)
  - Total: 37,114
  - Estimate (2023): 37,262
  - Density: 2,600.6/sq mi (1,004.11/km^{2})
- Time zone: UTC-5 (Eastern (EST))
  - Summer (DST): UTC-4 (EDT)
- ZIP code: 43026
- Area codes: 614 and 380
- FIPS code: 39-35476
- GNIS feature ID: 2394381
- Website: www.hilliardohio.gov

Hilliard is a city in Franklin County, Ohio, United States. The population was 37,114 at the 2020 census. It is a suburb of Columbus and part of Norwich Township.

== History ==
In 1852, John Reed Hilliard bought 10 acres (40,000 m^{2}) of farmland in western Franklin County, Ohio from Hoseah High and Abraham Wendell. Geographically, the Hilliard area is between Big Darby Creek on the west and the Scioto River on the east. Originally called Hilliard's Station, the town grew around the railroad route of the Piqua and Indiana Railroad station, which bisected the former Hilliard farmland. Hilliard's Station served as an ideal shipping point for agricultural products going to market and supplies coming to the farmers in the area. The original Hilliard area was platted by John Hilliard on September 1, 1853.

Until the mid 20th century, the railroad station and Main Street were the town center. In 1854, a post office was established in Hilliard's Station and the word Station was dropped from the town name. The Village of Hilliard became incorporated on July 13, 1869, with a population of 280 residents. In 1886 the first railroad station was located on the north side of the tracks, west of Main Street, and remained there until 1962 when all railroad services ceased. The original train station has been restored and remains in Hilliard's historical Weaver Park. The original platted area contained a mix of residences and businesses of varying ages and architecture.

The construction of three large residential subdivisions in the 1950s brought explosive growth to Hilliard. The connection to the Columbus regional sewer and water systems in the 1960s opened up the area to development. The Village of Hilliard gained city status officially from the Ohio Secretary of State by attaining a population of 5,633 on December 12, 1960.

With the completion of the I-270 outerbelt in the early 1970s, a second wave of explosive growth came to the area. Land uses in Hilliard continue to be a mix of residential and commercial development. A rich heritage of residential structures and architectural styles can be found in the historic district along Norwich Street.

== Geography ==
Hilliard is bordered on the east by Columbus and Upper Arlington, on the north by Columbus and Dublin, on the south by Galloway and Columbus, and to the west lies open farmland. Downtown Columbus lies in a distance to the southeast, its skyline visible at times when crossing bridges.

According to the United States Census Bureau, the city has a total area of 13.34 square miles (34.55 km^{2}), of which 13.17 square miles (34.11 km^{2}) is land and 0.17 square miles (0.44 km^{2}) is water.

== Demographics ==
Historical population
| Census | Pop. | Note | %± |
|---|---|---|---|
| 1870 | 282 | | — |
| 1880 | 400 | | 41.8% |
| 1890 | 338 | | −15.5% |
| 1900 | 376 | | 11.2% |
| 1910 | 370 | | −1.6% |
| 1920 | 451 | | 21.9% |
| 1930 | 465 | | 3.1% |
| 1940 | 583 | | 25.4% |
| 1950 | 610 | | 4.6% |
| 1960 | 5,633 | | 823.4% |
| 1970 | 8,369 | | 48.6% |
| 1980 | 7,996 | | −4.5% |
| 1990 | 11,796 | | 47.5% |
| 2000 | 24,230 | | 105.4% |
| 2010 | 28,234 | | 16.5% |
| 2020 | 37,114 | | 31.5% |
| 2025 (est.) | 38,898 | | 4.8% |
US Census

=== 2020 census ===
As of the 2020 census, Hilliard had a population of 37,114. The median age was 36.7 years. 25.7% of residents were under the age of 18 and 12.7% of residents were 65 years of age or older. For every 100 females there were 95.1 males, and for every 100 females age 18 and over there were 91.9 males age 18 and over.

99.9% of residents lived in urban areas, while 0.1% lived in rural areas.

There were 14,118 households in Hilliard, of which 36.7% had children under the age of 18 living in them. Of all households, 55.6% were married-couple households, 14.9% were households with a male householder and no spouse or partner present, and 23.5% were households with a female householder and no spouse or partner present. About 24.8% of all households were made up of individuals and 9.4% had someone living alone who was 65 years of age or older.

There were 14,727 housing units, of which 4.1% were vacant. The homeowner vacancy rate was 0.5% and the rental vacancy rate was 7.3%.

Racial composition as of the 2020 census
| Race | Number | Percent |
|---|---|---|
| White | 29,801 | 80.3% |
| Black or African American | 1,593 | 4.3% |
| American Indian and Alaska Native | 58 | 0.2% |
| Asian | 2,530 | 6.8% |
| Native Hawaiian and Other Pacific Islander | 10 | 0.0% |
| Some other race | 660 | 1.8% |
| Two or more races | 2,462 | 6.6% |
| Hispanic or Latino (of any race) | 1,627 | 4.4% |

=== 2010 census ===
As of the 2010 census, there were 28,435 people, 10,198 households, and 7,612 families residing in the city. The population density was 2,159.6 inhabitants per square mile (833.8/km^{2}). There were 10,637 housing units at an average density of 807.7 per square mile (311.9/km^{2}). The racial makeup of the city was 88.5% White, 3.0% African American, 0.2% Native American, 5.6% Asian, 0.8% from other races, and 1.9% from two or more races. Hispanic or Latino of any race were 2.3% of the population.

There were 10,198 households, of which 44.5% had children under the age of 18 living with them, 61.8% were married couples living together, 9.2% had a female householder with no husband present, 3.7% had a male householder with no wife present, and 25.4% were non-families. 21.2% of all households were made up of individuals, and 7.9% had someone living alone who was 65 years of age or older. The average household size was 2.77 and the average family size was 3.26.

The median age in the city was 35.9 years. 30.1% of residents were under the age of 18; 6.4% were between the ages of 18 and 24; 28.7% were from 25 to 44; 26.2% were from 45 to 64; and 8.6% were 65 years of age or older. The gender makeup of the city was 48.8% male and 51.2% female.

=== 2000 census ===
As of the census of 2000, there were 24,230 people, 8,577 households, and 6,492 families residing in the city. The population density was 2,174.8 inhabitants per square mile (839.7/km^{2}). There were 8,957 housing units at an average density of 804.0 per square mile (310.4/km^{2}). The racial makeup of the city was 85.1% White, 3.2% African American, 0.17% Native American, 1.48% Asian, 0.02% Pacific Islander, 5.72% from other races, and 1.32% from two or more races. Hispanic or Latino of any race were 4.56% of the population.

There were 8,577 households, out of which 46.3% had children under the age of 18 living with them, 64.7% were married couples living together, 7.8% had a female householder with no husband present, and 24.3% were non-families. 19.5% of all households were made up of individuals, and 5.7% had someone living alone who was 65 years of age or older. The average household size was 2.80 and the average family size was 3.26.

In the city the population was spread out, with 32.1% under the age of 18, 5.5% from 18 to 24, 37.8% from 25 to 44, 17.4% from 45 to 64, and 7.2% who were 65 years of age or older. The median age was 33 years. For every 100 females, there were 96.5 males. For every 100 females age 18 and over, there were 92.6 males.

The median income for a household in the city was $69,015, and the median income for a family was $76,207. Males had a median income of $50,551 versus $35,733 for females. The per capita income for the city was $28,496. About 0.6% of families and 2.2% of the population were below the poverty line, including 1.0% of those under age 18 and 8.3% of those age 65 or over.

== Culture ==
Hilliard is home to the Early Television Museum, the second largest First Responders Park in the United States, and Heritage Rail Trail. Hilliard also has the only flag pole from the World Trade Center that is not in a museum. The flag pole is located in front of the fire department on Northwest Parkway. The Hilliard Historical Society maintains a historical village near the Franklin County Fairgrounds.

=== Festivals ===
Hilliard annually hosts multiple festivals. This includes the Franklin County Fair, the Old Hilliardfest Art & Street Fair, and a Fourth of July parade and fireworks display. The city also holds a weekly summer concert series known as Celebration at the Station.

== Recreation ==
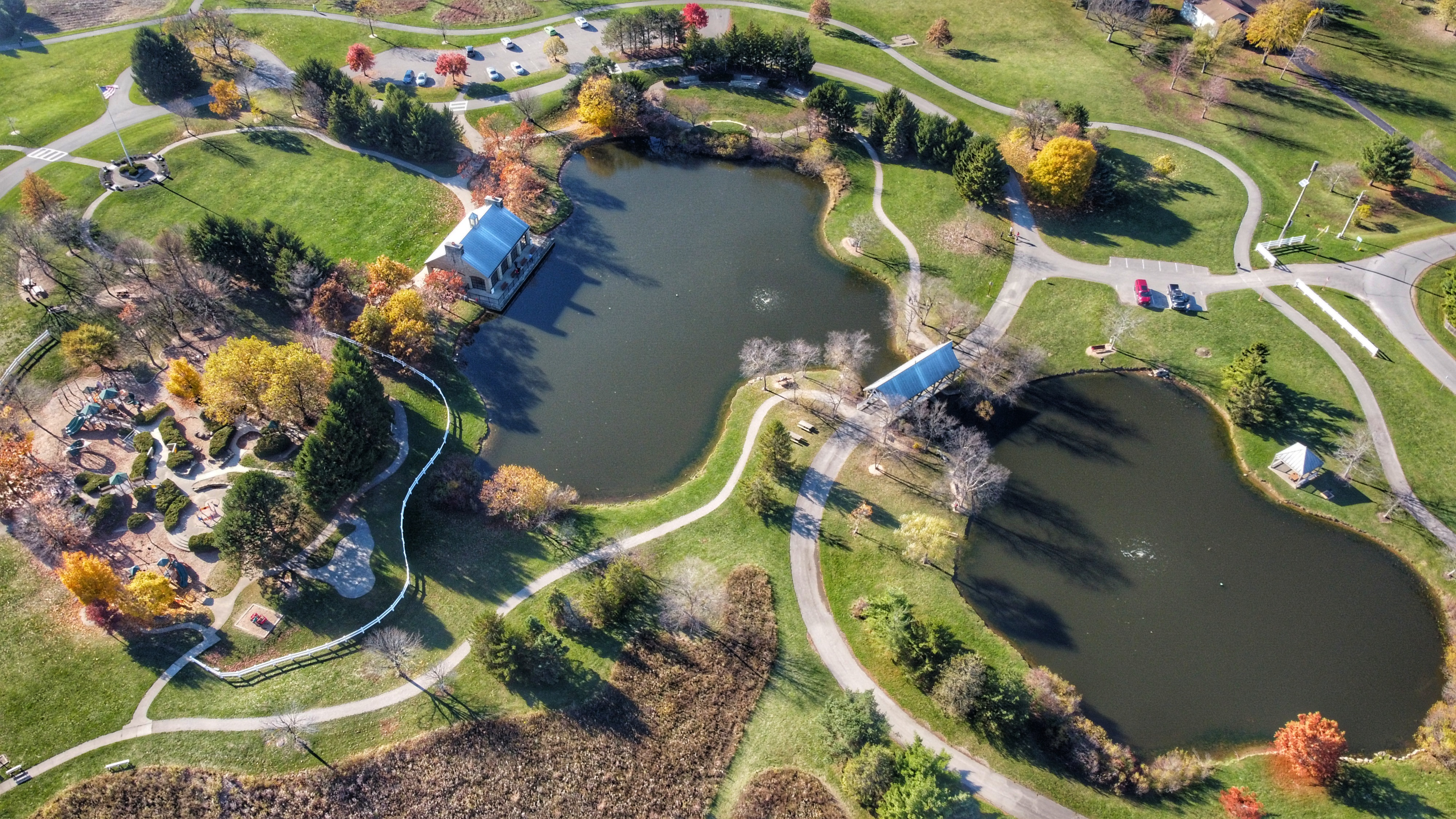
Homestead Metro Park

The Recreation Department oversees over 25 parks. The Heritage Rail Trail is in Hilliard with the trail head located in Old Hilliard on Center Street.

== Infrastructure ==
=== Public safety ===
Hilliard maintains its own Division of Police. The Hilliard Division of Police also provides police services for Norwich Township.

Norwich Township provides fire protection for the City of Hilliard and Norwich Township.

While Hilliard does not have its own Fire and Medical services, it feeds off of the Norwich Township Fire Department, and with that, Hilliard Police provides policing for Norwich Township.

=== Transportation ===
Hilliard's main streets are Cemetery Road and Main Street/Hilliard Rome Road. The city does not have any major Ohio state routes or US Routes within its immediate vicinity, however Hilliard's eastern end is accessible by Interstate 270, a ring road serving Columbus suburbs known locally as the "Outerbelt".

No major railways nor rail-based transport run to, from, through, or within Hilliard; however, there is a park and ride on Cemetery Road close to I-270.

Hilliard is served by John Glenn International Airport, which additionally serves a large majority of all commercial flights out of the Columbus area. Additionally, Hilliard is located extremely close to Don Scott Airport for general aviation and Ohio State University aviation classes.

== Education ==
The Hilliard City School District encompasses all of the original Brown and Norwich Township boundaries, the actual city of Hilliard, a portion of Columbus that is about the same size as that within Hilliard, as well as parts of the city of Dublin, and parts of Galloway. There are fourteen elementary schools (Alton Darby, Avery, Beacon, Britton, Brown, Darby Creek, Hilliard Crossing, Hilliard Horizon, Hoffman Trails, J.W. Reason, Norwich, Ridgewood, Scioto Darby, and Washington), two sixth-grade schools (Station and Tharp), three middle schools (Heritage, Weaver, and Memorial), and three high schools (Darby, Davidson, and Bradley) in the district. The high school sports teams are named the Panthers, Wildcats, and Jaguars, respectively. Also in the city of Hilliard is a K-8 Roman Catholic school: Saint Brendan School, and a K-8 Islamic school, Sunrise Academy.

== Notable person ==
- Mike Furrey (born 1977) – former football wide receiver and safety, head coach of the Limestone Saints
