= Hank =

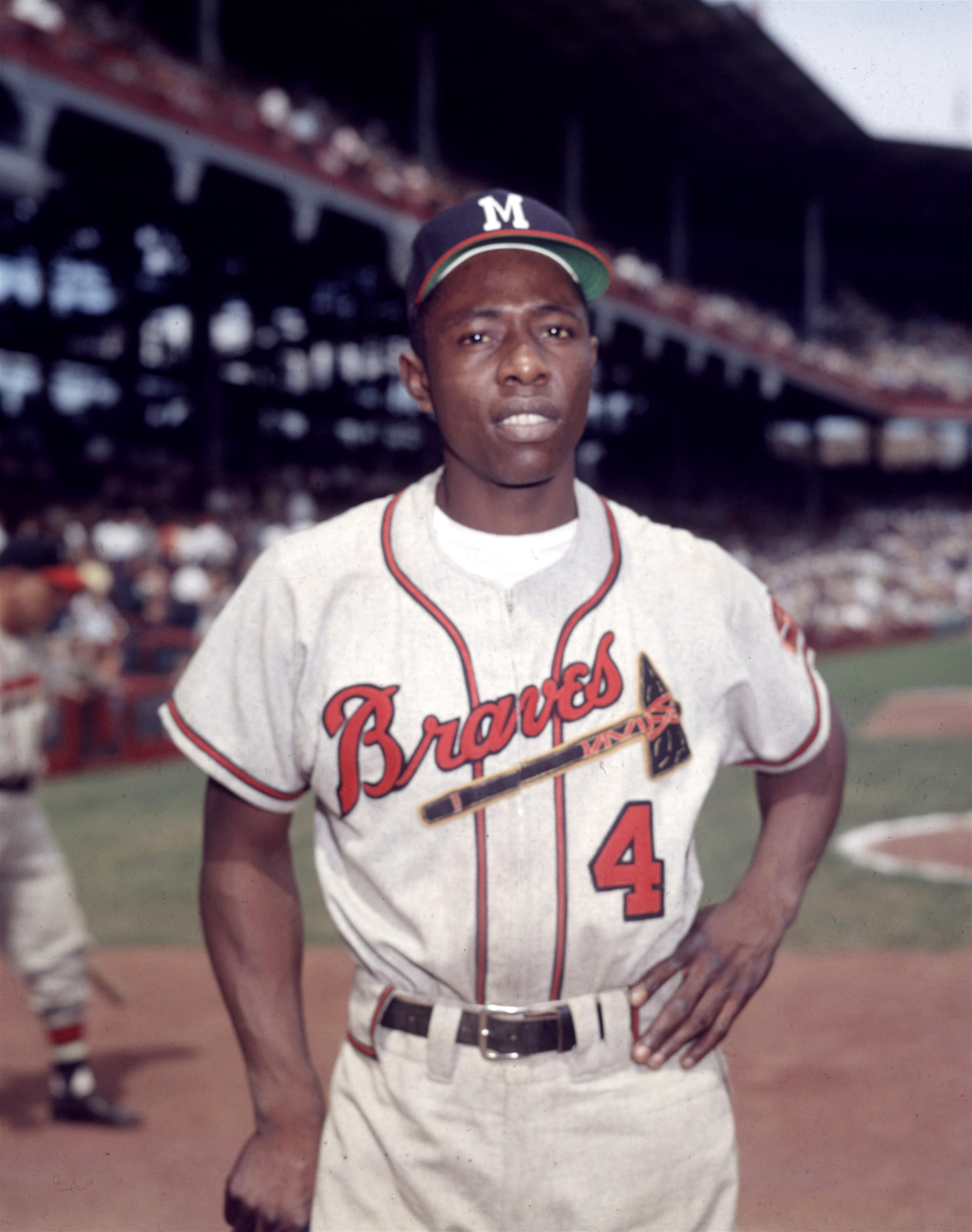
- Hank Aaron in 1954
- Pronunciation: /ˈhæŋk/
- Gender: Male

Origin
- Region of origin: US

Other names
- Related names: Henry, Harvey, Harry

Hank is a given name and a surname. It may have been inspired by the Dutch name Henk, itself a short form of Hendrik and thus related to Harry, Harvey, and Henry.

Notable people, characters, and animals with the name include:

== People with the given name ==
=== Male ===
- Hank Aaron (1934–2021), American MLB player
- Hank Adams (1943–2020), Native American activist known as a strategist, tactician, and negotiator
- Hank Aguirre (1931–1994), American MLB pitcher and business entrepreneur
- Hank Allen (1940–2024), American MLB player
- Hank Allison (born 1947), American NFL player
- Hank Anderson (1920–2005), American college basketball coach and player
- Hank Arft (1922–2002), American MLB player
- Hank Asher (1951–2013), American businessman
- Hank Autry (1947–2014), American AFL- and NFL player
- Hank Azaria (born 1964), American actor and producer
- Hank Bachmeier (born 1999), American UFL player
- Hank Bagby (1922–1993), American jazz musician
- Hank Ballard (1927–2003), American singer and songwriter; member of vocal group The Midnighters
- Hank Bartos (1913–1987), American NFL player
- Hank Baskett (born 1982), American NFL player
- Hank Bauer (1922–2007), American MLB player and manager
- Hank Bauer (American football) (born 1954), American sportscaster and former NFL player
- Hank Baylis (1923–1980), American Negro league player
- Hank Beatty (born 2003), American college football player
- Hank Bedford, American writer and film director
- Hank Beebe (1926–2023), American composer
- Hank Beenders (1916–2003), Dutch-American NBA player
- Hank Behrman (1921–1987), American MLB pitcher
- Hank Bell (1892–1950), American film actor
- Hank Berger (1952–2006), American nightclub owner and merchandiser
- Hank Biasatti (1922–1996), Italian-Canadian NBA- and MLB player
- Hank Bielawa (born 1933), American politician
- Hank Biesiot (born 1945), American former college football player and coach
- Hank Bjorklund (born 1950), American NFL player
- Hank Blalock (born 1980), American MLB player
- Hank Borowy (1916–2004), American MLB starting pitcher
- Hank Bothfeld (born 1930), American college ice hockey player
- Hank Brandt (1934–2004), American film- and television actor
- Hank Brown (born 1940), American politician and lawyer
- Hank Brown (American football) (born 2005), American college football player
- Hank Bruder (1907–1970), American NFL player
- Hank Bull (born 1949), Canadian artist, musician, and illusionist
- Hank Bullough (1934–2019), American NFL player and coach
- Hank Burnine (1932–2020), American NFL player
- Hank Butcher (1886–1979), American MLB player
- Hank Camelli (1914–1996), American MLB catcher
- Hank Chapman (1915–1973), American comic book writer
- Hank Chen (born 1989), American actor and comedian
- Hank Cheyne (born 1958), American actor and former lawyer
- Hank Chien (born 1974), American plastic surgeon and former video game world record holder
- Hank Cochran (1935–2010), American country music singer and songwriter
- Hank Coe (1946–2021), American politician
- Hank Conger (born 1988), American MLB catcher
- Hank Corwin, American film editor
- Hank Cramer, American folk singer and former army lieutenant colonel
- Hank Crisp (1896–1970), American football-, basketball-, baseball-, and track coach and college athletics administrator
- Hank DeBerry (1894–1951), American MLB catcher, and scout
- Hank DeZonie (1922–2009), American NBL- and NBA player
- Hank Dudek, American background screening company account manager; candidate in the 2010 United States House of Representatives elections in Georgia
- Hank Duncan (1894–1968), American Dixieland jazz pianist
- Hank Dutt, American past member of string quartet Kronos Quartet
- Hank Earl Carr (1968–1998), American murderer
- Hank Edwards (1919–1988), American MLB player
- Hank Edwards (gridiron football) (born 1983), American professional football player
- Hank Egan (born 1937), American NBA coach
- Hank Elespuru (1923–2004), American athlete, coach, and official
- Hank Elkins (born 1937), American civil rights advocate
- Hank Elliott (born 1936), American former politician and judge
- Hank Eng, American candidate in the 2008 United States House of Representatives elections in Colorado
- Hank Erickson (1907–1964), American MLB catcher
- Hank Eskin, American creator of website Where's George?
- Hank Evans (1914–2000), American NBL player
- Hank Fischer (born 1940), American former MLB pitcher
- Hank Fisher, real name of Washboard Hank (born 1954), Canadian musician, songwriter, and stage performer
- Hank Foiles (1929–2024), American MLB catcher
- Hank Foldberg (1923–2001), American college- and professional football player turned college football coach
- Hank Fraley (born 1977), American NFL coach, coordinator, and former player
- Hank Futch, American member of band The Blue Dogs (band)
- Hank Garland (1930–2004), American guitarist and songwriter
- Hank Garrett (born 1931), American actor, comedian, author, speaker, teacher, mixed martial artist, and retired professional wrestler
- Hank Garrity (coach) (1900–1972), American college football, baseball and basketball coach
- Hank Garrity (baseball) (1908–1962), American baseball player
- Hank Gastright (1865–1937), American MLB pitcher
- Hank Gathers (1967–1990), American college basketball player
- Hank Gehring (1881–1912), American MLB pitcher
- Hank Gillo (1894–1948), American NFL player and coach, and military personnel during World War I
- Hank Gilpin (born 1946), American furniture maker and wood sculptor
- Hank Goldberg (1940–2022), American sports radio- and television personality
- Hank Goldup (1918–2008), Canadian NHL player
- Hank Goodman (1919–2007), American NFL player
- Hank Gornicki (1911–1996), American MLB pitcher
- Hank Gowdy (1889–1966), American MLB player, manager, and coach
- Hank Green (born 1980), American vlogger, YouTuber, science communicator, novelist, stand-up comedian, and entrepreneur; member of rock band Hank Green and the Perfect Strangers
- Hank Greenberg (1911–1986), American MLB player and team executive
- Hank Gremminger (1933–2001), American NFL player
- Hank Griffin (boxer), American boxer of the 1890s and early 1900s
- Hank Griffin (baseball), American baseball pitcher of the 1910s
- Hank Hanegraaff (born 1950), American Christian author and radio talk-show host
- Hank Haney (born 1955), American professional golf instructor
- Hank Hardwick (1903–1961), American college football player and coach
- Hank Harris (born 1979), American actor
- Hank Harris (American football) (1923–1999), American NFL player
- Hank Heifetz (born 1935), American poet, novelist, documentarian, critic, and translator
- Hank Helf (1913–1984), American MLB catcher
- Hank Henry (1906–1981), American comedian and film- and television actor
- Hank Henry (soccer) (born 1964), American MISL- and CISL player
- Hank Huckaby (1941–2021), American politician
- Hank Hughes (1907–1963), American NFL player
- Hank Ilesic (born 1959), Canadian CFL player
- Hank Irvine (born 1943), Rhodesian-born American professional tennis player
- Hank Izquierdo (1931–2015), Cuban-born American MLB catcher, coach, manager, and scout
- Hank J. Ratner (born 1959), American media-, sports-, entertainment-, and telecommunications executive
- Hank Johnson (born 1954), American lawyer and politician
- Hank Johnson (baseball) (1906–1982), American MLB pitcher
- Hank Jones (1918–2010), American jazz pianist, bandleader, arranger, and composer
- Hank Kanalz, American comic book writer and editor
- Hank Kaplan (1920–2007), American boxing historian and writer
- Hank Kashiwa (born 1949), American Olympic alpine ski racer
- Hank Kazmierski (born 1949), American NASL player
- Hank Ketcham (1920–2001), American cartoonist
- Hank Ketcham (American football) (1891–1986), American college football player
- Hank Klibanoff (born 1949), American journalist and professor
- Hank Kozloski (1927–2013), American sportswriter
- Hank Kuehne (born 1975), American professional golfer
- Hank Kuhlmann (born 1937), American former NFL coach
- Hank Ladd (1908–1982), American actor and writer of radio, film, and stage
- Hank Lammens (born 1966), Canadian former NHL player
- Hank Lauricella (1930–2014), American Army officer, real estate developer, college football player, and politician
- Hank Laventhol (1927–2001), American painter, print maker, and sculptor
- Hank Lazer, American poet and critic
- Hank Lebioda (born 1994), American professional golfer
- Hank Lefkowitz (1923–2007), American BAA player
- Hank Lehvonen (1950–2022), Canadian NHL player
- Hank Leiber (1911–1993), American MLB player
- Hank Levine (born 1965), German director, documentary filmmaker, and writer
- Hank Liotart (born 1943), Dutch-American former NPSL-, MISL-, and NASL player
- Hank Locklin (1918–2009), American country music singer-songwriter
- Hank Lott (born 1974), American former politician
- Hank Luisetti (1916–2002), American college basketball player
- Hank Lundy (born 1984), American professional boxer
- Hank Lyon (born 1988), American politician
- Hank M. Bounds (born 1967), American educator
- Hank M. Tavera (1944–2000), American AIDS activist, artistic director, and archivist
- Hank Majeski (1916–1991), American MLB player, coach, and minor league manager
- Hank Mann (1887–1971), Russian-born American comedian and silent screen actor
- Hank Marr (1927–2004), American jazz musician
- Hank Marvin (born 1941), English multi-instrumentalist, vocalist, and songwriter
- Hank Mason (1931–2020), American MLB relief pitcher
- Hank McCune, American producer of television sitcom The Hank McCune Show
- Hank McDonald (1911–1982), American MLB pitcher
- Hank McDowell (born 1959), American former NBA-, CBA-, and USBL player
- Hank McGregor (born 1978), South African marathon canoeist and surf ski racer
- Hank Miller (1917–1972), American Negro league pitcher
- Hank Mills (1936–2005), American songwriter and composer
- Hank Mitchum, pen name of D. B. Newton (1916–2013), American writer of western fiction
- Hank Mizell (1923–1992), American singer, guitarist, and songwriter
- Hank Mobley (1930–1986), American jazz saxophonist and composer
- Hank Monis (1923–2011), Canadian studio musician
- Hank Monk (1826–1883), American stagecoach driver
- Hank Moonjean (1930–2012), American film-, executive-, and associate producer
- Hank Morgenweck (1929–2007), American MLB umpire
- Hank Morrison (1866–1927), American MLB pitcher
- Hank Nelken, American screenwriter and educator
- Hank Nichols (1936–2026), American college basketball referee and supervisor of officials
- Hank Norberg (1920–1974), American NFL player
- Hank Nowak (born 1950), Canadian NHL player
- Hank O'Day (1859–1935), American MLB pitcher, manager, and umpire
- Hank O'Keeffe (1923–2011), American NBL- and ABL player
- Hank Olmsted (1879–1969), American MLB starting pitcher
- Hank O'Neal (born 1940), American music producer, author, and photographer
- Hank Osasuna (born 1972), English actor and performance artist
- Hank Palmer (born 1985), Canadian sprinter
- Hank Parker (born 1953), American professional bass fisherman
- Hank Parker Jr. (born 1974), American stock car racing driver
- Hank Patterson (1888–1975), American actor and musician
- Hank Patterson (baseball) (1907–1970), American MLB catcher
- Hank Pellissier, American writer, editor, speaker, activist, political theorist, producer, and nonprofit director
- Hank Penny (1918–1992), American musician
- Hank Perry (1886–1956), American MLB player
- Hank Peters (1924–2015), American MLB executive
- Hank Pfister (born 1953), American tennis player
- Hank Piro (1917–2011), American NFL player
- Hank Pitcher (born 1949), American contemporary artist
- Hank Plona (born 1985), American college basketball coach
- Hank Poteat (born 1977), American former NFL player
- Hank Presswood (1921–2014), American Negro American League player
- Hank Raymonds (1924–2010), American college basketball player, coach, and college athletics administrator
- Hank Redd, American past member of soul group Maxayn
- Hank Rieger (1918–2014), American publicist and journalist
- Hank Risan (born 1955), American business executive, scientist, and creator of digital media rights and security patents
- Hank Roberts (born 1954), American jazz cellist and vocalist
- Hank Robinson (1887–1965), American MLB pitcher
- Hank Rockwell (1917–1997), American NFL player
- Hank Rogers (1917–?), American racing driver
- Hank Rosenstein (1920–2010), American BBA-, ABL-, and EPBL player and coach
- Hank Ruszkowski (1925–2000), American MLB catcher
- Hank Sauer (1917–2001), American MLB player, coach, and scout
- Hank Schenz (1919–1988), American MLB player
- Hank Schmulbach (1925–2001), American MLB pinch runner
- Hank Schreiber (1891–1968), American MLB player
- Hank Schubart (1916–1998), American-Canadian architect
- Hank Schwartz (1927–2020), American expert in video communications technology
- Hank Schyma (born 1982), American musician, songwriter, author, filmmaker, and professional storm chaser
- Hank Scott (1898–1972), Canadian politician
- Hank Searls (1922–2017), American author and screenwriter
- Hank Severeid (1891–1968), American MLB catcher and scout
- Hank Shanks (1900–1975), American Negro league baseball player
- Hank Shaw (1926–2006), English bebop jazz trumpeter
- Hank Shaw (author) (born 1970), American chef, author, and outdoorsman
- Hank Shermann (born 1958), Danish musician and songwriter; member of heavy metal band Mercyful Fate
- Hank Shocklee, American past member of hip hop production team The Bomb Squad
- Hank Siemiontkowski (born 1950), American former basketball player
- Hank Simms (1923–2013), American voice actor and announcer
- Hank Simon (1862–1925), American MLB player
- Hank Skinner (1962–2023), American murderer
- Hank Small (born 1947), American former football coach and college athletics administrator
- Hank Small (baseball) (1953–2010), American MLB player
- Hank Smith (disambiguation), several people
- Hank Snow (1914–1999), Canadian-born American country music guitarist, singer, and songwriter
- Hank Soar (1914–2001), American NFL player and MLB umpire
- Hank Stackpole (1935–2020), American Marine Corps lieutenant general during the Vietnam War
- Hank Stanton (1920–1975), American football player
- Hank Steinberg (born 1969), American television- and film writer, producer, and director
- Hank Steinbrecher (1947–2025), American soccer executive, player, and coach
- Hank Steinbrenner (1957–2020), American MLB businessman
- Hank Stram (1923–2005), American AFL- and NFL coach
- Hank Stuever (born 1968), American journalist
- Hank Sullivant (born 1983), American rock musician and record producer
- Hank Swasey (1893–1980), American athlete and coach
- Hank Sweeney (1915–1980), American MLB player
- Hank Thomas (born 1941), American civil rights activist and entrepreneur
- Hank Thompson (disambiguation), several people
- Hank Thormahlen (1896–1955), American MLB pitcher
- Hank Thorns (born 1989), American NBL player
- Hank Utley (1924–2014), American baseball author and historian
- Hank Van Sickle (born 1961), American electric- and upright bassist; past member of blues rock band John Mayall & the Bluesbreakers
- Hank Vasconcellos (1911–1996), American football coach and college athletics administrator
- Hank Vaughan (1849–1893), American West outlaw, gambler, and gunfighter
- Hank von Hell (1972–2021), Norwegian singer and actor
- Hank Walbrick (born c. 1953), American college football coach
- Hank Walker, ring name of Joseph Sculthorpe (born 1998), American professional wrestler and former football player
- Hank Wangford (born 1940), English country musician and psychiatrist
- Hank Wardle (1915–1995), Canadian Royal Air Force pilot during World War II
- Hank Wayland (1906–1983), American sing jazz double-bassist
- Hank Webb (born 1950), American former MLB pitcher
- Hank Weber (1924–2022), American politician
- Hank Weidell (1889–1950), American Negro league baseball pitcher
- Hank Wesselman (1941–2021), American anthropologist
- Hank Whitney (1939–2020), American ABA- and NBA player
- Hank Williams (disambiguation), several people
- Hank Willis Thomas (born 1976), American conceptual artist
- Hank Winston (1904–1974), American MLB pitcher
- Hank Woon (born 1978), American fiction author, game designer, and screenwriter
- Hank Worden (1901–1992), American cowboy-turned-character actor
- Hank Workman (1926–2020), American MLB player
- Hank Wyse (1917–2000), American MLB pitcher

=== Female ===
- Hank Phillippi Ryan, American investigative reporter and mystery novelist

== People with the nickname ==
=== Male ===
- Ariel Scherbacovsky (born 1979), American member of indie rock-pop duo Hank & Cupcakes
- Hank Bassen (1932–2009), Canadian NHL player
- Hank Blade (1920–2003), Canadian NHL player
- Hank Chinaski, alter ego of American writer Charles Bukowski
- Hank Cicalo (1932–2024), American recording engineer
- Hank Ciesla (1934–1976), Canadian NHL player
- Hank Crawford (1934–2009), American alto saxophonist, pianist, arranger, and songwriter
- Hank Day (1892–1955), American football coach
- Hank DeVito, American musician and photographer
- Hank Erwin (born 1949), American evangelical Christian, and former broadcaster and politician
- Hank Ferris (born c. 1920s), American college football coach
- Hank Foley, American university president
- Hank Frierson (1902–1982), American Olympic equestrian
- Hank Greenspun (1909–1989), American newspaper publisher, real estate developer, and journalist
- Hank Greenwald (1935–2018), American MLB sportscaster
- Hank Hancock (1936–2024), American politician
- Hank Harper Jr. (born 1970), American politician
- Hank Herring (1922–1999), American boxer
- Hank Hulvey (1897–1982), American MLB pitcher
- Hank Levy (1927–2001), American jazz composer and saxophonist
- Hank Magnuski (born 1944), American telecommunications engineer
- Hank Marino (1889–1976), Italian-born American ten-pin bowling champion
- Hank Medress (1938–2007), American singer and record producer; member of doo-wop band The Tokens
- Hank Meijer (born 1952), American billionaire businessman
- Hank Messick (1922–1999), American investigative journalist and author
- Hank Miklos (1910–2000), American MLB pitcher
- Hank Monteith (born 1945), Canadian NHL player
- Hank Nelson (1937–2012), Australian historian
- Hank Norton (1927–2019), American football coach
- Hank Parkhurst (1895–1954), American businessman and publishing organizer of Alcoholics Anonymous
- Hank Petrusma (born 1942), Australian politician
- Hank Plante, American television reporter and newspaper columnist
- Hank Reinhardt (1934–2007), American author, editor, science fiction fan, and armorer and authority on medieval weapons
- Hank Riebe (1921–2001), American MLB catcher
- Hank Ritter (1893–1964), American MLB pitcher
- Hank Rowan (1923–2015), American engineer, businessman, and philanthropist
- Hank Rushmere (1913–2002), British rower
- Hank Sanicola (1914–1974), American music manager, publisher, businessman, and pianist
- Hank Sapoznik (born 1953), American author, record- and radio producer, and performer of traditional Yiddish and American music
- Hank the Angry Drunken Dwarf, nickname of Henry Joseph Nasiff Jr. (1962–2001), American entertainer and radio personality
- Hank Wilkins (born 1954), American politician
- Hank Wilson (1947–2008), American LGBT rights activist and AIDS activist and survivor
- Harry Feldman (1919–1962), American MLB pitcher
- Henrik Lundqvist (born 1982), Swedish former NHL player
- Henrik Sedin (born 1980), Swedish NHL player
- Henrik Zetterberg (born 1980), Swedish former NHL player
- Henry (Hank) Sylvern (1908–1964), American keyboardist, composer, conductor, and arranger
- Henry Åkervall (1937–2000), Canadian Olympic ice hockey player
- Henry Buttelmann (1929–2019), American Air Force fighter pilot during the Korean War and Vietnam War
- Henry E. Emerson (1925–2015), American Army lieutenant general during the Vietnam War
- Henry Ford II (1917–1987), American businessman in the automotive industry
- Henry H. "Hank" Price (1915–2002), American politician
- Henry Iba (1904–1993), American college basketball player, coach, and athletics administrator
- Henry Lee Jackson, real name of Big Bank Hank (1956–2014), American hip hop recording artist and manager
- Henry Moreno (1930–2007), American horse racing jockey
- Henry Paulson (born 1946), American investment banker and financier
- Henry Trewhitt (1927–2003), American journalist and author
- Herman G. Tillman Jr. (1922–2012), American Air Force pilot
- Herman Jay Cohen (born 1932), American diplomat
- Maurice R. Greenberg (born 1925), American Jewish centenarian, business executive, and military personnel

=== Female ===
- Hank Fort (1908–1973), American singer and songwriter

== People with the middle name ==
- Carlos Hank González (1927–2001), Mexican politician and businessman
- Carlos Hank González (businessman, born 1971) (born 1971), Mexican businessman and banker
- Carlos Hank Guerreiro (born 2000), Mexican Olympic equestrian
- Carlos Hank Rhon (born 1947), Mexican billionaire businessman
- Jorge Hank Rhon (born 1956), Mexican businessman and politician

== People with the surname ==
- Bob Hank (1923–2012), Australian SANFL player
- Tigre Hank (born 1991), Mexican tennis player
- William Hank (1902–1942), American Navy officer during World War II

== Animals ==
- Hank (dog) (c. 2012–2024), American dog that the Milwaukee Brewers rescued, named after MLB player Hank Aaron
- Hank the Cat (2001–2014), American Maine Coon cat and joke candidate
- Hank the Tank, American black bear

== Fictional characters ==
- Hank, in the US children's novel series Hank the Cowdog
- Hank, in the 2008 comedy film Hank and Mike, played by Thomas Michael
- Hank, in the 2011 iOS video game "Hank Hazard"
- Hank, in the 2013 comedy-romance film Hank and Asha, played by Andrew Pastides
- Hank Anchorman, in the animated comedy TV series Johnny Test, voiced by James Arnold Taylor
- Hank Bennett, in the US TV soap opera Passions, played by Dalton James and Ryan McPartlin
- Hank Booth, in the US police procedural drama TV series Bones, played by Ralph Waite
- Hank Cummings, in the US TV soap opera Sunset Beach, played by John Martin
- Hank Dearborn, in the 1965 US TV sitcom Hank, played by Dick Kallman
- Hank Fielding, in the US late-night live sketch comedy variety show Saturday Night Live, played by Robert Smigel
- Hank Foxx, in the US horror anthology TV series American Horror Story, played by Josh Hamilton
- Hank Freebird, in the 2010 simulation video game Trauma Team
- Hank Gannon, in the US soap opera One Life to Live, played by Nathan Purdee
- Hank Grotowski, in the 2001 US independent Southern Gothic romantic drama film Monster's Ball, played by Billy Bob Thornton
- Hank Hall, in the US DC Comics, played by Alan Ritchson and Tait Blum (young) in the US superhero TV series
- Hank Haystack, in the US media franchise and shared universe The Lego Movie
- Hank Henshaw, in the US DC Comics
- Hank Heywood, in the US DC Comics
- Hank Hill, in the US animated sitcom King of the Hill, voiced by Mike Judge
- Hank Hippopopalous, in the US adult animated tragicomedy TV series BoJack Horseman, voiced by Philip Baker Hall
- Hank Janson, in the UK books by Stephen Daniel Frances
- Hank Jennings, in the US surrealist mystery horror drama TV series Twin Peaks, played by Chris Mulkey
- Hank Kingsley, in the US TV sitcom The Larry Sanders Show, played by Jeffrey Tambor
- Hank Landry, in the military science fiction adventure TV series Stargate SG-1, played by Beau Bridges
- Hank Landry, in the US teen neo-noir mystery drama TV series Veronica Mars, played by Patrick Fabian
- Hank Lawson, in the US comedy-drama TV series Royal Pains, played by Mark Feuerstein
- Hank Loomis, in the US slasher franchise Scream, played by C.W. Morgan
- Hank MacLean, in the US post-apocalyptic drama TV series Fallout, played by Kyle MacLachlan
- Hank Marlow, in the 2017 US monster film Kong: Skull Island, played by John C. Reilly
- Hank McCoy, in the US Marvel Comics series X-Men
- Hank Moody, in the US comedy-drama TV series Californication, played by David Duchovny
- Hank Morgan, in the 1889 US historical novel A Connecticut Yankee in King Arthur's Court
- Hank Perkins, in the US animated action comedy TV series Kim Possible, voiced by Rob Paulsen
- Hank Pym, in the US Marvel Comics
- Hank Rearden, in the 1957 US novel Atlas Shrugged
- Hank Schrader, in the US neo-Western crime drama TV series Breaking Bad, played by Dean Norris
- Hank Scorpio, in the US animated sitcom The Simpsons, voiced by Albert Brooks
- Hank Sullivan, in the US drama TV series Dynasty, played by Brent Antonello
- Hank Summers, in the US supernatural horror drama TV series Buffy the Vampire Slayer, played by Dean Butler
- Hank Tate, in the US mockumentary sitcom TV series The Office, played by Hugh Dane
- Hank Venture, in the US adult animated action-adventure TV series The Venture Bros., voiced by Christopher McCulloch
- Hank Voight, in the US police procedural TV series Chicago P.D., played by Jason Beghe
- Hank Wiggen, in the US medical drama TV series House, played by Scott Foley
- Hank Yarbo, in the Canadian TV sitcom Corner Gas, played by Fred Ewanuick
- Hank Zipzer, in the UK children's TV series Hank Zipzer, played by Nick James

== See also ==
- Hanks, a surname
