= Hank (disambiguation) =

Hank is both a given name and a surname.

Hank may also refer to:

== In entertainment ==
- Hank (1965 TV series)
- Hank (2009 TV series)
- Hank (album), a 1957 album by jazz saxophonist Hank Mobley
- "Hank", a song by James from the album Living in Extraordinary Times

== Other uses ==
- Hardware Hank, a hardware store
- Hank (unit of measure), a measurement of length used in the textile and meat industries
- Hank (sail components), a clip by which a jib or staysail is attached to a stay
- Hank, Netherlands, a village in the municipality of Altena
- USS Hank, a U.S. Navy destroyer
- Hank, or hanky/hankie – slang for handkerchief.
