= ARA Segui =

At least two ships of the Argentine Navy have been named Segui:

- ARA Segui (M-8), a minesweeper previously the German M-90 and renamed on transfer in 1922. She was decommissioned in the 1960s
- ARA Segui (D-25), an Allen M. Sumner-class destroyer launched in 1944 as USS Hank and renamed on transfer in 1972. She was scrapped in 1983.
