= Tyler Lashbrook =

American basketball coach

Boston Celtics
- Position: Assistant coach
- League: NBA

Personal information
- Born: Owensboro, Kentucky, U.S.

Career information
- High school: Apollo (Owensboro, Kentucky)
- Coaching career: 2018–present

Career history

Coaching
- 2018–2023: Philadelphia 76ers (player development)
- 2023–2024: Boston Celtics (player development)
- 2024–2025: Maine Celtics
- 2025–present: Boston Celtics (assistant)

William Tyler Lashbrook is an American professional basketball assistant coach for the Boston Celtics of the National Basketball Association (NBA). He was previously the head coach of the Celtics' NBA G League affiliate, the Maine Celtics.

== Coaching career ==
From 2014 to 2018, Lashbrook worked as a basketball operations intern and video coordinator with the Philadelphia 76ers.

From 2018 to 2023, Lashbrook worked as a video coordinator and player development coach with the 76ers under head coaches Brett Brown and Doc Rivers.

Prior to the 2023–24 season, Lashbrook joined the Celtics organization as a player development coach, focusing on leading the Celtics' late game situational prep and developing younger players.

In September 2024, Lashbrook was named as the head coach of the Celtics' NBA G League affiliate, the Maine Celtics. He was named G League Coach of the Month in February 2024 after leading the Celtics to a league-best 7–1 record. Over the 2024–25 season, the team finished 21-13 while guard JD Davison was awarded NBA G League Most Valuable Player. As the third-best team in the Eastern Conference, they were eliminated by the #1 seed Osceola Magic in the Conference Finals.

In June 2025, it was announced that Lashbrook would move into a new role in the organization as former Celtic Phil Pressey was to be named head coach of the Maine affiliate.

== Personal life ==
Lashbrook is a 2014 graduate of Western Kentucky University.
