= USS Laffey (DD-459) =

Benson-class destroyer

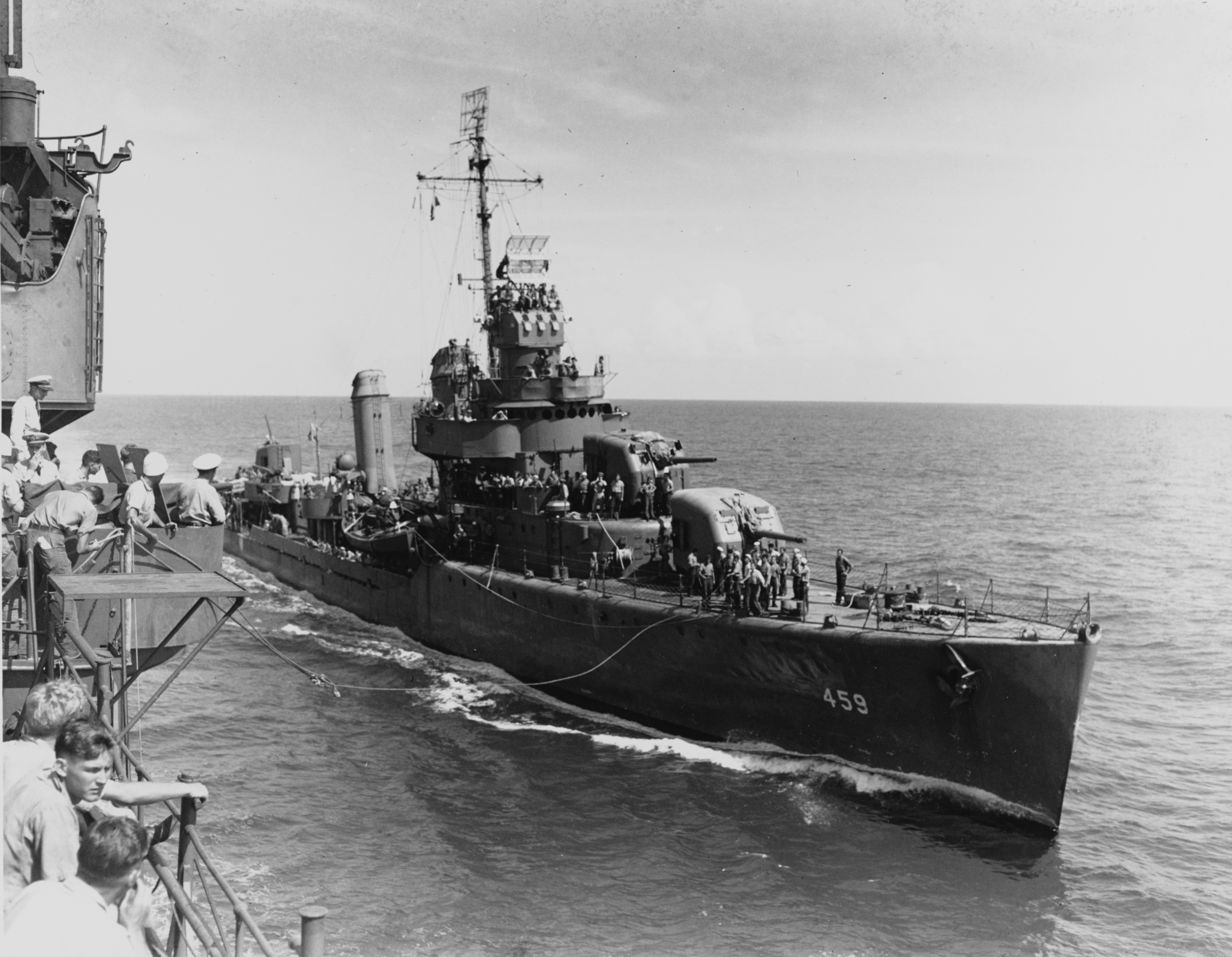
- USS Laffey alongside another U.S. Navy ship, while at sea in the South Pacific on 4 September 1942

History

United States
- Name: USS Laffey
- Namesake: Bartlett Laffey
- Builder: Bethlehem Shipbuilding Corporation, San Francisco, California
- Laid down: 13 January 1941
- Launched: 30 October 1941
- Commissioned: 31 March 1942
- Identification: DD-459
- Fate: Sunk at the Battle of Guadalcanal, 13 November 1942

General characteristics
- Class & type: Benson-class destroyer
- Displacement: 1,620 long tons (1,650 t)
- Length: 347 ft 10 in (106.02 m)
- Beam: 36 ft 1 in (11.00 m)
- Draft: 11 ft 10 in (3.61 m)
- Speed: 37.5 kn (69.5 km/h; 43.2 mph)
- Complement: 208
- Armament: 4 × 5 in (127 mm)/38 cal guns; 1 × 1.1"/75 caliber anti-aircraft cannon; 5 × 20 mm anti-aircraft cannons; 5 × 21 inch (533 mm) torpedo tubes; 5 × depth charge projectors; 2 × depth charge tracks

USS Laffey (DD-459) was a Benson-class destroyer of the United States Navy during World War II. She was the first destroyer named for Seaman Bartlett Laffey. She was lost in action on 13 November 1942.

== Construction and commissioning ==
Laffey was laid down on 13 January 1941 by Bethlehem Shipbuilding Company at San Francisco, California. She was launched 30 October 1941, sponsored by Miss Eleanor G. Forgerty, granddaughter of Seaman Laffey; and commissioned on 31 March 1942, Lieutenant Commander William E. Hank in command.

== Service history ==
After shakedown off the west coast, Laffey headed for the war zone via Pearl Harbor, arriving at Efate on 28 August 1942. She steamed in the antisubmarine screen until she joined Task Force 18 on 6 September. When the flagship—the aircraft carrier Wasp—was sunk on 15 September, Laffey rescued survivors and returned them to Espiritu Santo. She sailed with Task Force 64 and touched at Noumea, New Caledonia, on 18 September.

Laffey had her first fleet action in the Battle of Cape Esperance (also known as the Second Battle of Savo Island) on 11 and 12 October 1942. The destroyer operated with Admiral Norman Scott's cruiser group, guarding against Japanese attempts to reinforce Guadalcanal. On 11 October, when the group formed into single column, Laffey joined two other destroyers in the van. When the engagement began, Laffey raked the cruiser Aoba with three of her 5-inch (127 mm) guns.

After the battle, Laffey met with a group escorting transports from Nouméa on 11 November, and sailed to Lunga Point, arriving the next day. The disembarking operations were interrupted by a heavy air attack. On 13 November, Laffey was placed in the van of a column of eight destroyers and five cruisers under Admiral Daniel J. Callaghan. Early in the midwatch, the radar operator reported contact with the enemy. It was a Japanese force of two battleships, one light cruiser, and 14 destroyers, under Vice Admiral Hiroaki Abe, and the First Naval Battle of Guadalcanal began. At the height of the violent battle, the battleship Hiei came through the darkness; she and Laffey were headed at full speed for the same spot. They missed colliding by 20 feet (6 m). Laffey unleashed her torpedoes and, using all her firepower, raked the battleship's bridge, wounding Admiral Abe, and killing his chief of staff. Admiral Abe was thereafter limited in his ability to direct his ships for the rest of the battle. With a battleship on her stern, a second on her port beam, and the destroyers Yukikaze and Terizuki on her port bow, Laffey fought the Japanese ships with the three remaining main battery guns in a no-quarter duel at point-blank range. She was hit by a 14-inch (356 mm) shell from Hiei. Then, a torpedo fired from Yukikaze hit aft, blowing her fantail clean off, which served as the final blow as Laffey was put out of action. As the order to abandon ship was passed, a violent explosion ripped the destroyer apart and she sank immediately with heavy loss of life. This action earned her the Presidential Unit Citation.

Of the 247 crewmen aboard, 59 were killed, including the commanding officer, William E. Hank. The wounded in the engagement numbered 116.

== Wreck ==
The sunken ship was located in Ironbottom Sound and surveyed in 1992 by Robert Ballard. Subsequent expeditions have taken more photos of the wreck, which sits upright and fairly intact on the ocean floor.

== Awards ==
Laffey was awarded the Presidential Unit Citation for her performance in the South Pacific, and three battle stars for service in World War II.

== Service ribbons ==
Presidential Unit Citation
American Campaign Medal
Asiatic-Pacific Campaign Medal with three bronze service stars
World War II Victory Medal
