= Hanks =

Hanks is a surname of English, or Dutch origin, meaning "son of Hankin" and may refer to:

- Boo Hanks (1928–2016), American Piedmont blues guitarist and singer
- Carol Hanks Aucamp (born 1943), American tennis player
- Colin Hanks (born 1977), American actor
- Craig Hanks (born 1961), American philosopher
- Ephraim Hanks (1826–1896), prominent member of the 19th-century Latter Day Saint movement
- Ernest Hanks (1888–1965), English footballer
- Fletcher Hanks (1889–1976), cartoonist
- Henry Garber Hanks (1826–1907), American mineralogist
- James M. Hanks (1833–1909), member of the United States House of Representatives
- Jim Hanks (born 1961), American voice-over artist and character actor
- Kerri Hanks (born 1985), American soccer player
- Larry Hanks (born 1953), American entomologist
- Lena Tracy Hanks (1879–1944), American botanist
- Merton Hanks (born 1968), American former National Football League safety
- Mike Hanks (born 1952 or 1953), American college basketball coach
- Nancy Lincoln (1784–1818), maiden name Hanks, mother of Abraham Lincoln
- Nancy Hanks (art historian) (1927–1983), second chairman of the National Endowment for the Arts
- Patrick Hanks (born 1940), English lexicographer and corpus linguist
- Robert Lowery Hanks (1913–1971), American actor better known as Robert Lowery
- Ron Hanks, American politician
- Sam Hanks (1914–1994), American race car driver
- Terrill Hanks (born 1995), American football player
- Thomas C. Hanks, American seismologist
- Tom Hanks (born 1956), American film actor
- William Hanks (born 1952), American anthropologist and linguist

== See also ==
- Hank (disambiguation)
