= Maine Celtics =

American professional basketball team of the NBA G League

- 2025–26 NBA G League season
- Conference: Eastern
- League: NBA G League
- Founded: 2009
- History: Maine Red Claws; 2009–2021; Maine Celtics; 2021–present
- Arena: Portland Exposition Building
- Location: Portland, Maine
- Team colors: Green, white, black, brown
- Main sponsor: Vistaprint
- President: Dajuan Eubanks
- General manager: Jarell Christian
- Head coach: Phil Pressey
- Ownership: Boston Celtics
- Affiliation: Boston Celtics
- Championships: 0
- Conference titles: 1 (2024)
- Division titles: 3 (2015, 2016, 2017)
- Website: maine.gleague.nba.com

The Maine Celtics are an American professional basketball team in the NBA G League based in Portland, Maine. They are affiliated with the Boston Celtics, and play their home games at the Portland Expo Building. Previously known as the Maine Red Claws, the Boston Celtics purchased the franchise in July 2019 from Maine Basketball, LLC, a company chaired by William Ryan Jr., and renamed the team the Maine Celtics in 2021.

== Franchise history ==
The Maine Red Claws logo, used from 2009 to 2021

On February 25, 2009, the NBA Development League (D-League) awarded the city of Portland, Maine, with an expansion franchise. On July 21, 2009, the Red Claws announced Austin Ainge as the first head coach of the team. On April 2, 2009, "Red Claws" was announced as the winning name after a name-the-team contest, beating out Beacons, Crushers, Destroyers, Swarm, and Traps. The name and logo gave homage to the lobster fishing industry, a major economic engine of the New England area. The use of "Red" in the team's name also served to pay tribute to longtime Boston Celtics coach Red Auerbach. During the 2009–10 season, the Red Claws were the only D-League team to sell out all 24 of their home games. This streak continued until the 2011–12 season, ending the streak at 48 consecutive games.

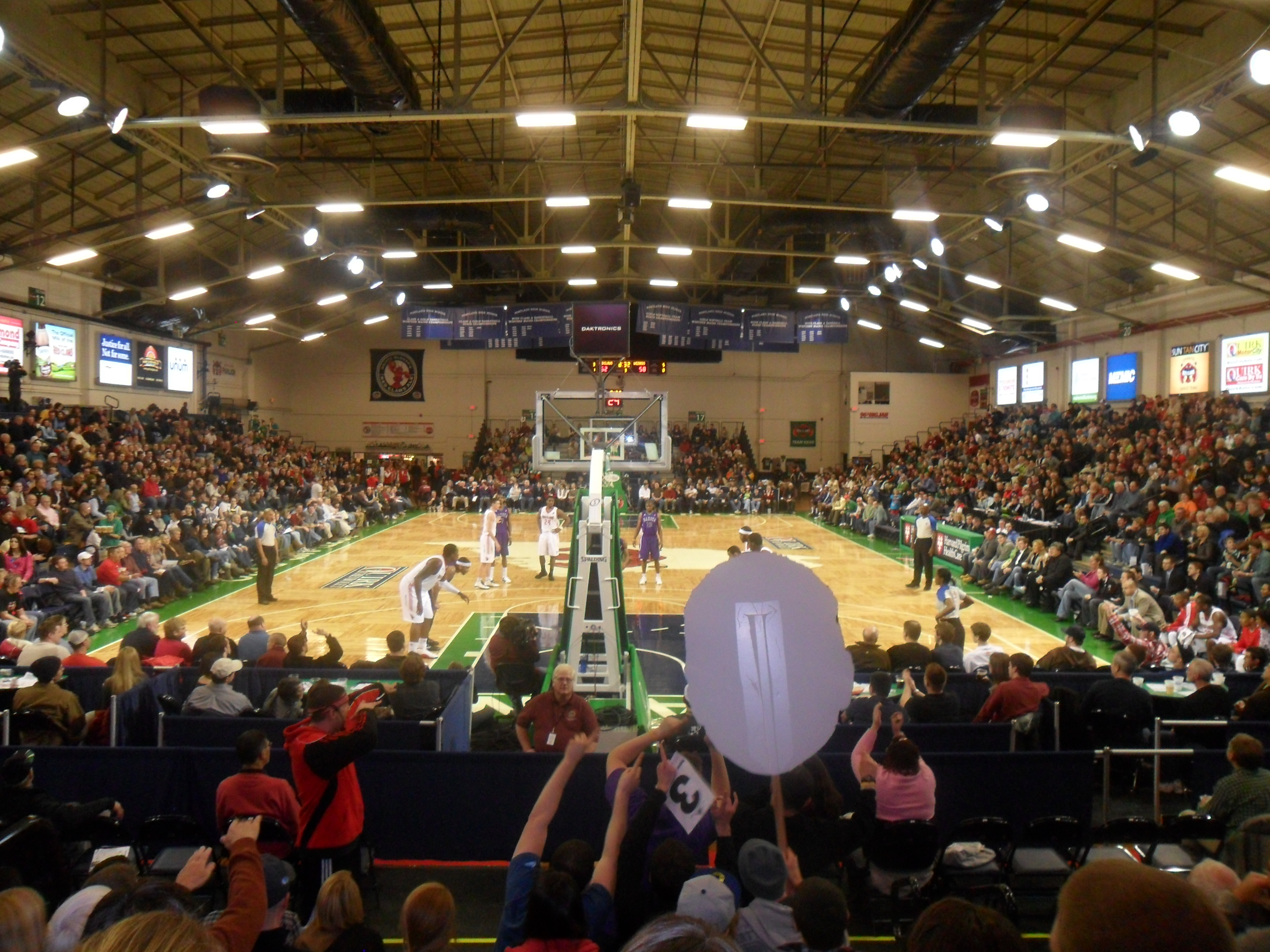
The Red Claws against the Dakota Wizards in the Portland Exposition Building in January 2011.

On June 21, 2012, the Red Claws announced that they had entered a hybrid affiliation with the Boston Celtics, making the Celtics the Red Claws' sole affiliate. For the team's first two seasons, their affiliation was split between the Celtics and the Charlotte Bobcats. For its third season, the team's affiliation was split between Boston, Charlotte and the Philadelphia 76ers.

The Red Claws made their first playoff appearance in April 2013, entering the playoffs as the eighth seeded team and being swept by the Rio Grande Valley Vipers in a best-of-three-game opening round series.

On July 16, 2014, the Red Claws announced that Mike Taylor would not return for a third season as the team's head coach. He had a 45–55 record as coach over two seasons with the team. He was replaced by Canadian Scott Morrison after 11 seasons as the head coach of Lakehead University's Lakehead Thunderwolves. Morrison spent the 2013–14 season as a D-League assistant. On June 21, 2017, Brad Stevens, Boston Celtics head coach, named him as an assistant coach with the Celtics. In 2017, the D-League rebranded as the NBA G League via a sponsorship with Gatorade.

On July 25, 2019, the Celtics announced they would purchase the Red Claws franchise from original owners Bill Ryan and Bill Ryan Jr. Before the sale, the Red Claws had been one of the few remaining independently owned G League franchises. Their sale to the Celtics continued the trend of NBA teams purchasing their G League affiliates. The sale was finalized on October 15, 2019.

On December 7, 2019, Bryce Brown set a franchise record with scoring 11 of 11 three-pointers for the Red Claws in a 128–123 loss to the Delaware Blue Coats. The 2019–20 season was then curtailed in March 2020 by the onset of the COVID-19 pandemic while the Red Claws were in first place in their division. The following 2020–21 season was then delayed due to the ongoing pandemic-related restrictions and eventually held at a single location in Orlando, Florida. However, the Celtics decided to not have the Red Claws participate and opted out of the season.

On May 24, 2021, the Boston Celtics announced the Red Claws had been rebranded the Maine Celtics beginning with the 2021–22 season.

On July 2, 2025, the Maine Celtics announced that Phil Pressey would be named the 11th head coach in franchise history. Pressey replaced Tyler Lashbrook, who would remain with the Boston Celtics as an assistant coach.

== Season-by-season ==
Season	Division	Regular season				Postseason results
Season	Division	Finish	Wins	Losses	Pct.	Postseason results
Maine Red Claws
2009–10	Eastern	4th	27	23	.540	
2010–11	Eastern	5th	18	32	.360	
2011–12	Eastern	6th	21	29	.420	
2012–13	Eastern	3rd	26	24	.520	Lost First Round (Rio Grande Valley) 0–2
2013–14	Eastern	4th	19	31	.380	
2014–15	Atlantic	1st	35	15	.700	Lost First Round (Fort Wayne) 0–2
2015–16	Atlantic	1st	31	19	.620	Lost First Round (Canton) 0–2
2016–17	Atlantic	1st	29	21	.580	Won First Round (Fort Wayne) 2–1; Lost Semifinals (Raptors 905) 0–2
2017–18	Atlantic	4th	17	33	.340	
2018–19	Atlantic	5th	19	31	.380	
2019–20	Atlantic	1st	28	14	.667	Season cancelled by COVID-19 pandemic
2020–21	Opted out of single-site season					
Maine Celtics
2021–22	Eastern	10th	16	16	.500	
2022–23	Eastern	4th	19	13	.594	Lost Quarterfinal (Cleveland) 100–113
2023–24	Eastern	2nd	21	13	.618	Won Semifinal (Delaware) 119–112; Won Conf. Final (Long Island) 99–77; Lost NBA G-League Finals (Oklahoma City) 1–2
2024–25	Eastern	3rd	21	13	.618	Won Quarterfinal (Capital City) 115–95; Won Semifinal (Westchester) 124–118; Lost Conf. Final (Osceola) 122–135
Regular season record			326	314	.509	2009–present
Playoff record			9	13	.409	2009–present

== Head coaches ==
#	Head coach	Term	Regular season				Playoffs				Achievements
#	Head coach	Term	G	W	L	Win%	G	W	L	Win%	Achievements
1	Austin Ainge	2009–2011	100	45	55	.450	—	—	—	—	
2	Dave Leitao	2011–2012	50	21	29	.420	—	—	—	—	
3	Mike Taylor	2012–2014	100	45	55	.450	2	0	2	.000	
4	Scott Morrison	2014–2017	150	95	55	.633	9	2	7	.221	NBA D-League Coach of the Year (2015)
5	Brandon Bailey	2017–2019	100	36	64	.360	—	—	—	—	
6	Darren Erman	2019–2020	42	28	14	.667	—	—	—	—	
7	Jarell Christian	2021–2022	32	16	16	.500	—	—	—	–	
8	Alex Barlow	2022–2023	32	19	13	.594	1	0	1	.000	
9	Blaine Mueller	2023–2024	34	21	13	.618	5	3	2	.375	
10	Tyler Lashbrook	2024–2025	34	21	13	.618	3	2	1	.667	
11	Phil Pressey	2025–present	0	0	0	–	3	0	0	–	

== Current roster ==
Maine Celtics roster
Players

Pos.	No.	Player	Height	Weight	DOB	From
G	99	Devin Carter (TW)	6 ft 2 in (1.88 m)	199 lb (90 kg)	2002-03-18	Providence
G/F	14	Dre Davis	6 ft 6 in (1.98 m)	215 lb (98 kg)	2001-08-23	Mississippi
F	22	Tucker DeVries	6 ft 7 in (2.01 m)	215 lb (98 kg)	2002-12-07	Indiana
G	3	Hayden Gray	6 ft 4 in (1.93 m)	190 lb (86 kg)	2003-05-11	UC San Diego
G	31	Caleb Grill	6 ft 3 in (1.91 m)	205 lb (93 kg)	2000-06-15	Missouri
G	16	Logan Johnson	6 ft 2 in (1.88 m)	180 lb (82 kg)	1999-10-11	Saint Mary's
F	30	Gabe McGlothan	6 ft 6 in (1.98 m)	235 lb (107 kg)	1999-03-03	Grand Canyon
F	20	Dillon Mitchell (TW)	6 ft 6 in (1.98 m)	200 lb (91 kg)	2003-10-03	St. John's
F	4	Hank Morgan	6 ft 5 in (1.96 m)	200 lb (91 kg)	2002-07-19	Hamilton
F	23	Josh Roberts	6 ft 9 in (2.06 m)	220 lb (100 kg)	1999-07-15	Manhattan
G	7	Milos Uzan	6 ft 3 in (1.91 m)	175 lb (79 kg)	2002-12-26	Houston
F/C	77	Amari Williams (TW)	6 ft 11 in (2.11 m)	269 lb (122 kg)	2002-01-28	Kentucky
C	24	Steven Jamerson	6 ft 10 in (2.08 m)

Coaches
Head coach
- Phil Pressey
Assistant(s)
- Brendan Baker
- Taaj Ridley
- Landon Tatum
- Steve Tchiengang (Associate HC)

Legend
- (DP) Unsigned draft pick
- (FA) Free agent
- (S) Suspended
- (P) Prospects
- (NBA) On assignment from NBA affiliate
- (TW) Two-way affiliate player
- Injured

Roster
Updated: November 3, 2026

== NBA affiliates ==
- Boston Celtics (2009–present)
- Charlotte Bobcats (2009–2012)
- Philadelphia 76ers (2011–2012)
