= Phil Pressey =

American basketball player (born 1991)

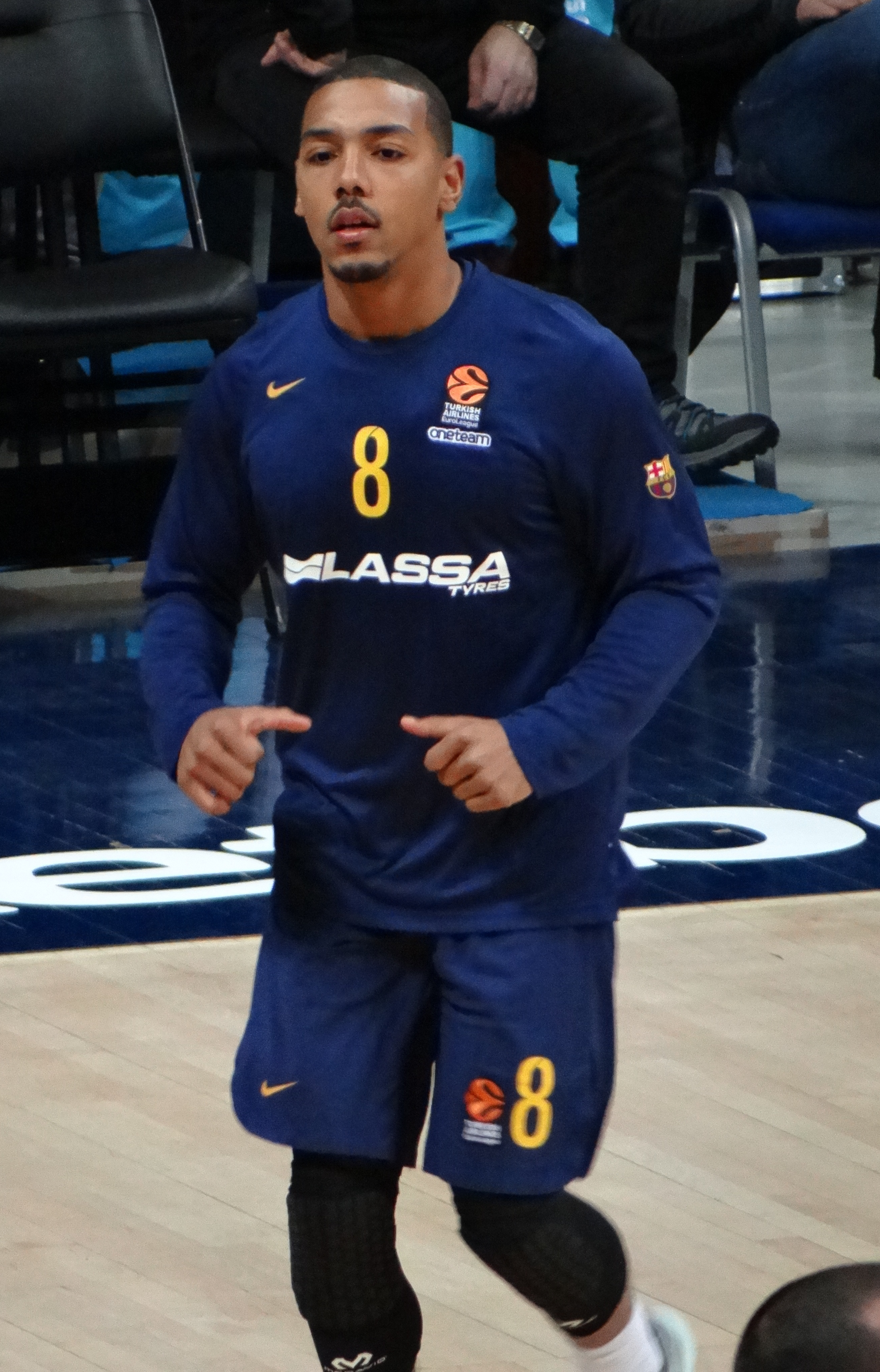
- Pressey warming up with Barcelona in 2018

Maine Celtics
- Title: Head coach
- League: NBA G League

Personal information
- Born: February 17, 1991 (age 35) Dallas, Texas, U.S.
- Listed height: 5 ft 11 in (1.80 m)
- Listed weight: 177 lb (80 kg)

Career information
- High school: Cushing Academy (Ashburnham, Massachusetts); Episcopal School of Dallas (Dallas, Texas)
- College: Missouri (2010–2013)
- NBA draft: 2013: undrafted
- Playing career: 2013–2022
- Position: Point guard
- Number: 26, 25, 11, 8, 4
- Coaching career: 2022–present

Career history

Playing
- 2013–2015: Boston Celtics
- 2015: →Maine Red Claws
- 2015: Philadelphia 76ers
- 2015–2016: Idaho Stampede
- 2016: Phoenix Suns
- 2016–2017: Santa Cruz Warriors
- 2017–2018: FC Barcelona
- 2018–2019: Beşiktaş
- 2019–2020: Estudiantes
- 2020–2022: EWE Baskets Oldenburg

Coaching
- 2022–2023: Missouri (graduate assistant)
- 2023–2025: Boston Celtics (assistant)
- 2025–present: Maine Celtics

Career highlights
- As player: Copa del Rey champion (2018); First-team All-SEC (2013); Third-team All-Big 12 (2012); AP Honorable mention All-American (2013); As assistant coach: NBA champion (2024)
- Stats at NBA.com
- Stats at Basketball Reference

Phillip Michael Pressey (born February 17, 1991) is an American professional basketball coach and former player who played at the point guard position. He is currently the head coach for the Maine Celtics of the NBA G League.

His prior professional teams were the Boston Celtics, Philadelphia 76ers and Phoenix Suns of the National Basketball Association (NBA), and the Maine Red Claws, Idaho Stampede, and Santa Cruz Warriors of the NBA Development League. He also played professionally overseas, notably for FC Barcelona Lassa and Movistar Estudiantes. Pressey played college basketball for the Missouri Tigers.

As a junior playing point guard for the 2012–13 Missouri Tigers men's basketball team, Pressey announced on April 10, 2013, that he would forgo his senior season of eligibility at Missouri and enter the 2013 NBA draft instead. He led the 2011–12 Big 12 Conference in assists, steals and assist-to-turnover ratio and was a 2011–12 All-Big 12 team selection as a result. He shares the Southeastern Conference (SEC) single-game assists record (19) and was the 2012 SEC Preseason Player of the Year. He earned 2012–13 All-SEC First team selection and was the conference assist champion. He earned Associated Press 2013 All-American honorable mention recognition. He holds Missouri single-game, single-season and career assists records and numerous Missouri steals records, including career steals.

Pressey was a high school basketball All-state selection by the Texas Association of Basketball Coaches (TABC) and helped his team achieve 2009 and 2010 Southwest Preparatory Conference (SPC) state championships in basketball. In high school, several YouTube videos of him dunking (often over much taller players) became popular. He is the son of 1982 first-round NBA draft selection and 1982 Consensus All-American Paul Pressey.

== Early years ==
2009 Nike Global Challenge
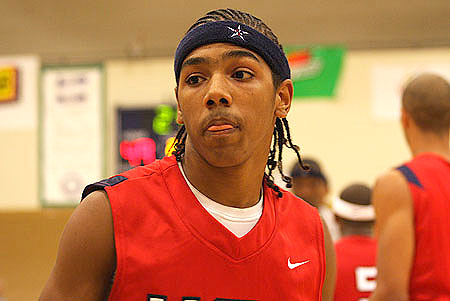
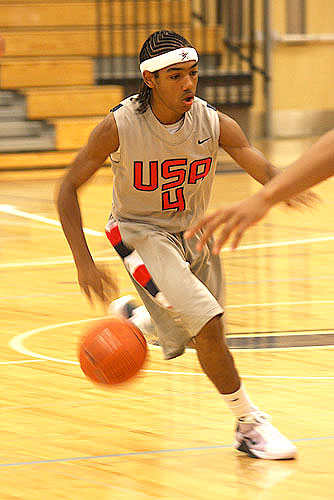

In June 2006, Pressey stood at 5 feet 3 inches (1.60 m). That year, he led the Boston Amateur Basketball Club (BABC), also known as the Boston Amateur Athletic Club, to the 2006 Amateur Athletic Union (AAU) National Championship. He had joined the team as a seventh-grader in 2005. He played his freshman year at Waltham High School in Waltham, Massachusetts and his sophomore high school basketball season for Cushing Academy. As the family moved for his father's jobs with various NBA franchises, Pressey spent summers with BABC teammate (and future Missouri teammate) Alex Oriakhi.

In 2008, Pressey's family moved to Dallas when Paul took a job with the New Orleans Hornets, and Phil began to play with Episcopal School of Dallas for his junior season. During his two years at Episcopal, the team won its second and third consecutive SPC Division I boys' state championship in 2009 and 2010. He was one of the two best point guards at the July 2009 LeBron James Skills Academy, according to reports in The Plain Dealer. Pressey made his verbal commitment to Missouri on September 13, 2009. Pressey's father, Paul, had been teammates with Missouri head coach Mike Anderson. Anderson had known Pressey since he was an infant and remained close to the family as "Uncle Mike". On April 12, 2010, Pressey's older brother Matt, who was a junior college transfer, gave his verbal commitment to join his brother in Missouri's 2010 entering class. On April 15, Oregon attempted to lure Anderson, but after meeting with Oregon's athletic director, Anderson decided to stay at Missouri.

External videos
- Pressey dunking (over Tony Mitchell) posted on May 22, 2010

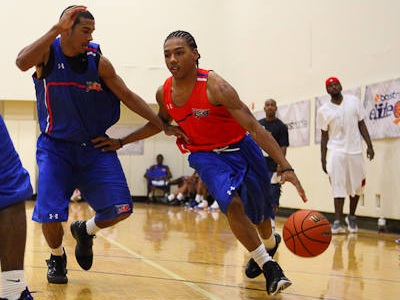
Pressey in 2009

As a senior Pressey earned TABC All-state recognition and Dallas Morning News first team All-area recognition. The All-area team included Perry Jones, Le'Bryan Nash, Marcus Smart and Kyan Anderson. During the 2010 SPC championship game, Pressey tallied 32 points, 9 assists, 8 rebounds and 3 steals against Greenhill School. Videos of him dunking in high school have made him a YouTube sensation. During the 2010 TABC All-star game, he dunked over Tony Mitchell, who at the time was a player approximately a foot taller than Pressey. This video has more than 900,000 views. Because of his diminutive stature, he is often compared to another undersized Dallas basketball player, Spud Webb.

College recruiting
Name	Hometown	School	Height	Weight	Commit date
Phil Pressey; PG	Dallas, Texas	Cushing Academy (MA, Fr-So); Episcopal School (TX, Jr-Sr)	5 ft 10 in (1.78 m)	162.5 lb (73.7 kg)	Sep 13, 2009
Phil Pressey; PG	Recruit ratings: Scout: Rivals: (95)				
Overall recruit ranking: Scout: 11 (PG) Rivals: 61, 15 (PG) ESPN: 42, 9 (PG)
Note: In many cases, Scout, Rivals, 247Sports, On3, and ESPN may conflict in their listings of height and weight.; In these cases, the average was taken. ESPN grades are on a 100-point scale.; Sources: "2010 Missouri Basketball Commitment List". Rivals.; "Missouri College Basketball Recruiting Commits". Scout.; "Missouri Tigers: SEC Conference: 2010 Player Commits". ESPN.; "Scout.com Team Recruiting Rankings". Scout.; "2010 Team Ranking". Rivals.

== College career ==
=== Freshman season ===
On December 18, 2010, Pressey tallied 11 assists while adding 15 points against the Central Arkansas Bears. This tied a Missouri Tigers freshman single-game assist record (Shawn Teague, 1980 vs. Lamar). Then, he broke his right index finger prior to the December 22, 2010 Braggin' Rights game against Illinois. Pressey missed four games and did not return to the lineup until the January 8 Big 12 Conference opener against Colorado, where he appeared in the second half. Another highlight for Pressey came when he posted 6 steals for the Tigers against the Texas A&M Aggies in the 2011 Big 12 men's basketball tournament on March 10, 2011. This established a new Missouri Tigers postseason single-game record. Freshman single-game records do not appear in the media guide. He started 12 games for the 2010–11 Tigers and set numerous Missouri freshman season records, including average steals (2.0), average assists (3.9) and total assists (117).

=== Sophomore season ===
In a January 14, 2012 contest against the Texas Longhorns, Pressey posted 18 points and 10 assists for his second career double-double. During his sophomore season for the 2011–12 Tigers, he recorded 12 assists in a game four times: Villanova (12/6), Texas Tech (1/28), #5 Kansas (2/25) and Oklahoma State (3/8). At the end of February, he was named to the Naismith Award top 30 midseason Watchlist. Pressey's total of 223 assists and average of 6.4 assists broke Anthony Peeler's school single-season records (179, 5.8) set for the 1989–90 Missouri Tigers. For the 2011–12 Big 12 season, he was an All-Big 12 selection (1st team – CBSSports.com; 2nd team – Associated Press; 3rd team – Big 12 coaches). He was also a 2012 Big 12 men's basketball tournament all-tournament selection and a Bob Cousy Award finalist.

=== Junior season ===
Pressey became captain of the Missouri team as a junior. CBS Sports listed him as a 2012 first team preseason All-American and the eighth-best player in its preseason top 100. Sports Illustrated also named him to its preseason All-American first team. CBS also named him the second-best point guard (behind Isaiah Canaan). Pressey was both a preseason John R. Wooden Award top 50 selection and a preseason Naismith Award top 50 selection in 2012. Pressey was the preseason SEC player of the year selection by the SEC media and a first team All-SEC selection by the coaches. Pressey holds the Missouri career assists average record and entered the season within striking distance of Peeler's Missouri career assists and career steals totals of 497 and 196.

In December, the Naismith Memorial Basketball Hall of Fame named Pressey as a Cousy Award nominee. In the December 22, 2012 Braggin' Rights game against Illinois he posted 11 assists and 12 points for his third career double-double. In Missouri's subsequent game on December 28, 2012, he recorded another double-double with 19 assists and 19 points against UCLA tying the Southeastern Conference single-game assist record (Kenny Higgs, 1976–77 LSU; Bill Hann, 1967–68 Tennessee). On January 5, Pressey established a new career high with 26 points, while recording 5 assists and 3 rebounds against Bucknell. This earned him SEC player of the week. On January 8, Pressey tied the Mizzou Arena single-game assist record with 13 against Alabama along with 11 points as part of his fifth double-double. On January 9, he was selected as one of 20 Cousy Award finalists. At the time, he was described as the most efficient defender in the nation in terms of points allowed per play defended. On January 10 the Wooden Award midseason top 25 list, which included Pressey, was announced. On February 9, he surpassed Peeler's career assist total of 497 against Ole Miss. Pressey posted a new career-high 27 points along with 10 assists and 4 steals on February 23 against Kentucky as part of his fourth double-double of the season and sixth of his career. On March 12, the U.S. Basketball Writers Association named Pressey to its 2012–13 Men's All-District VI (IA, MO, KS, OK, NE, ND, SD) Team, based upon voting from its national membership. That same day, he was a selection to the eight-man 2013 All-SEC First Team by the SEC coaches. He was a selection to the five-man 2013 All-SEC First Teams by three of four FOX Sports South writers. Pressey was also an All-SEC First Team selection by the Kansas City Star. Pressey ended the season with 196 career steals, tying Peeler's school record, and bettered his own school single-season assist records with 240 and 7.1/game. He was named to the National Association of Basketball Coaches Division I All‐District 21 first team on March 26, as selected and voted on by member coaches of the NABC, making him eligible for the State Farm Coaches' Division I All-America team. Pressey earned Associated Press honorable mention All-American recognition. He was the 2012–13 Southeastern Conference men's basketball season assist champion with a 7.1 assists/game average.

== Professional career ==
=== 2013 NBA draft ===
On April 10, 2013, Pressey announced he would not be returning to play his senior season for the Missouri Tigers, choosing instead to enter the 2013 NBA draft. Pressey stated his intentions in a statement posted on the Tigers team website. According to the Associated Press, while averaging a career-best 11.9 points and 7.1 assists as a junior his play was erratic as he also committed an average 3.5 turnovers. Pressey had a 37.6% field goal accuracy during his final season, which the Associated Press described as one in which he "struggled with late-game decision-making in losses to UCLA, Louisiana State, Texas A&M, Arkansas, Kentucky and Tennessee". ESPN noted that he is projected to be a late-second-round draft selection at best. Three senior starters, including Oriakhi, as well as Laurence Bowers and Keion Bell were graduating. Pressey was one of 60 players invited to the NBA Draft Combine.

=== Boston Celtics (2013–2015) ===
After going undrafted in the 2013 NBA draft, Pressey signed with the Boston Celtics to play in the 2013 Orlando Summer League. He was a known commodity to the Celtics. Pressey's AAU team had even practiced at the team facility in Waltham. His performance in the Summer League led to Pressey signing a deal with the Celtics on July 22, 2013. The contract was believed to be a three-year deal for the league minimum, which was $490,180 during his rookie season. The Celtics began the season without four-time All-Star point guard Rajon Rondo who had endured an anterior cruciate ligament injury during the prior season. Pressey made his regular season debut in the 2013–14 Celtics season opener on October 30 at the Air Canada Centre against the Toronto Raptors. He did not play in the next three games, but after the Celtics got off to an 0–4 start, head coach Brad Stevens shuffled the lineup. On November 6, at home against the Utah Jazz, Pressey recorded the first three assists, first steal and first field goal of his career. Then on November 9, he posted four assists and tallied in 7 points in 21 minutes of play. He posted a team-high 5 assists on November 19, 2013, against the Houston Rockets. He established a new career high with 8 assists on November 25 against the Charlotte Bobcats. On January 15, with Rondo's return imminent, the Celtics traded guards Jordan Crawford and MarShon Brooks, clearing the way for Pressey to start that night against the Toronto Raptors. Pressey posted 10 assists and no turnovers in his first start. On January 22, with Rondo, Avery Bradley and Jerryd Bayless all sitting out and Pressey making his second career start, Pressey scored a career-high 20 points against Washington before fouling out. Upon Rondo's return, Pressey occasionally started to give Rondo rest. He posted a double-double on April 5 against the Detroit Pistons with 12 points and a career-high 11 assists. On April 11, he had another career high with 13 assists as part of a 10-point double-double against the Charlotte Bobcats. He matched the 13 assists the following night against the Cleveland Cavaliers.

In July 2014, Pressey re-joined the Celtics for the 2014 NBA Summer League. His performance earned him a roster spot for the regular season, as the team guaranteed his contract for the 2014–15 season. On February 5, 2015, he was assigned to the Maine Red Claws of the NBA Development League. He was recalled the next day. On July 15, Pressey was waived by the Celtics.

=== Philadelphia 76ers (2015) ===
On July 24, 2015, Pressey signed with the Portland Trail Blazers, but was waived on October 23 after appearing in four preseason games. On October 25, he was claimed off waivers by the Utah Jazz, but was waived by the team the following day. On November 1, he was acquired by the Idaho Stampede of the NBA Development League as an affiliate player of the Jazz. However, three days later, he signed with the Philadelphia 76ers to help the team deal with numerous injuries. Philadelphia had to use an NBA hardship exemption in order to sign him as he made their roster stand at 16, one over the allowed limited of 15. He debuted with the 76ers that night against the Milwaukee Bucks, his father's long-time team. On December 4, he was waived by the 76ers after appearing in 14 games.

=== Idaho Stampede / Phoenix Suns (2015–2016) ===
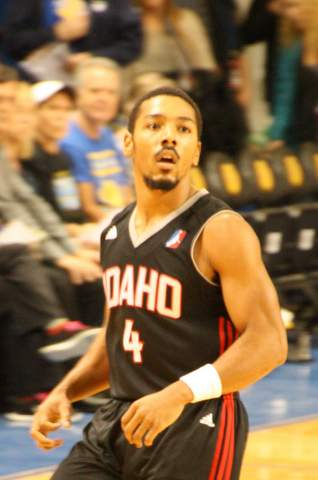
Pressey with the Idaho Stampede in 2016

On December 7, 2015, Pressey was reacquired by the Idaho Stampede of the NBA Development League. Two days later, he made his debut with Idaho in a 102–96 loss to the Texas Legends, recording four points, six rebounds, six assists and one steal in 24 minutes. He scored a season-high 21 points twice, and had three double-doubles for Idaho, recording a season-high 13 assists on February 8, 2016, against the Los Angeles D-Fenders.

On February 20, 2016, Pressey signed a 10-day contract with the Phoenix Suns. He made his debut for the Suns the following day, recording six points, two rebounds, five assists, one steal and three blocks in 28 minutes off the bench in a 118–111 loss to the San Antonio Spurs, becoming the first NBA player shorter than 6'0" to record three blocks in a game since Nate Robinson in 2013. A day later, he had a 10-assist game against the Los Angeles Clippers. On March 1, he signed a second 10-day contract with the Suns. Following the expiration of his second 10-day contract, the Suns parted ways with Pressey. Two days later, he was reacquired by Idaho.

=== Golden State Warriors / Santa Cruz Warriors (2016–2017) ===
On September 16, 2016, Pressey signed with the Golden State Warriors. However, he was later waived by the Warriors on October 20 after appearing in five preseason games. On October 31, 2016, he was acquired by the Santa Cruz Warriors, Golden State's D-League affiliate team.

=== FC Barcelona (2017–2018) ===
On July 27, 2017, Pressey signed with a one-year deal with FC Barcelona Lassa of the Liga ACB. Barcelona, which had a 41–33 record, won the 2018 Copa del Rey de Baloncesto, although Pressey did not play. He joined the Oklahoma City Thunder for the 2018 NBA Summer League.

=== Besiktas (2018–2019) ===
He signed with Beşiktaş of the Turkish Basketball Super League (BSL) on September 11, 2018.

=== Movistar Estudiantes (2019–2020) ===
On August 11, 2019, Pressey signed with Spanish club Movistar Estudiantes. Pressey averaged 7.9 points and 4.6 assists per game.

=== EWE Baskets (2020–2022) ===
On July 21, 2020, Pressey signed with EWE Baskets Oldenburg of the Basketball Bundesliga (BBL). He averaged 9.1 points, 4 assists and 1.4 steals per game. Pressey re-signed with the team on July 7, 2021.

== Coaching career ==
On June 24, 2022, he signed with Missouri Tigers men's basketball as an assistant coach.

On June 19, 2023, he was hired by the Boston Celtics as an assistant coach.

On July 2, 2025, the Maine Celtics announced that Pressey would be the team’s new head coach for the 2025-26 season, replacing Tyler Lashbrook. On October 1, 2026, Pressey would return for a second season as Head Coach of the Maine Celtics. He became the first returning Maine head coach in seven seasons.

== Career statistics ==
Legend
GP	Games played	GS	Games started	MPG	Minutes per game
FG%	Field goal percentage	3P%	3-point field goal percentage	FT%	Free throw percentage
RPG	Rebounds per game	APG	Assists per game	SPG	Steals per game
BPG	Blocks per game	PPG	Points per game	**Bold**	Career high

=== NBA ===
==== Regular season ====
Year	Team	GP	GS	MPG	FG%	3P%	FT%	RPG	APG	SPG	BPG	PPG
2013–14	Boston	**75**	**11**	**15.1**	.308	.264	.644	1.4	3.2	**.9**	**.1**	2.8
2014–15	Boston	50	0	12.0	.368	.246	**.673**	**1.6**	2.3	.6	**.1**	3.5
2015–16	Philadelphia	14	0	12.1	**.382**	**.308**	.500	**1.6**	**3.3**	.8	**.1**	**3.9**
Career		139	11	13.7	.338	.261	.634	1.5	2.9	.8	.1	3.2

==== Playoffs ====
Year	Team	GP	GS	MPG	FG%	3P%	FT%	RPG	APG	SPG	BPG	PPG
2015	Boston	2	0	2.5	.000	.000	–	.5	.0	.0	.5	.0

== Personal ==
Phil's parents are Elizabeth (Liz) and Paul Pressey. He has three siblings: Ashley, Angela and Paul Jr. (known by his middle name of Matthew). Paul Sr. was an NCAA basketball All-American, National Invitation Tournament champion, NBA All-Defensive Team selection, JUCO National champion and a first-round NBA draft choice. Phil was teammates with his older brother Matt for two years at Missouri. As of September 2013, Matt is playing with the Plymouth Raiders in the British Basketball League. Their older sister Angie was an All-American volleyball player for the California Golden Bears. Pressey wore cornrows throughout his high school basketball career. Pressey was a childhood friend and AAU teammate of Alex Oriakhi who transferred from Connecticut after playing for the 2010–11 national champion Huskies team to join the 2012–13 Tigers.
