= Hank and Asha =

- Film poster
- Directed by: James E. Duff
- Written by: Julia Morrison; James E. Duff
- Produced by: James E. Duff
- Starring: Mahira Kakkar; Andrew Pastides
- Cinematography: Bianca Butti
- Edited by: Julia Morrison
- Music by: Lara Meyerratken
- Distributed by: FilmRise
- Release dates: January 19, 2013 (Slamdance); April 11, 2014 (New York)
- Running time: 73 minutes
- Country: United States
- Language: English
- Box office: $16,878

Hank and Asha is a 2013 comedy-romance film directed by James E. Duff, and produced and co-written by James E. Duff and Julia Morrison. The film stars Mahira Kakkar and Andrew Pastides. It premiered in competition at the 2013 Slamdance Film Festival where it won the Audience Award for Best Narrative Feature, and was later acquired for US distribution by FilmRise.

== Plot ==
Asha (Mahira Kakkar), born and raised in India, is studying abroad in Prague. She longs for deeper connections with people at a time in her life when everything is about to change. Hank (Andrew Pastides), a filmmaker and lonely new transplant to New York City, is still reeling from a romantic breakup, and facing increasing pressure from his parents to return to North Carolina to rescue the failing family business.

When Asha sees Hank’s documentary at a film festival, she feels inspired to send him a video message. Intrigued, Hank responds in kind. Their friendship develops through an unconventional video correspondence, and as their relationship intensifies, they must decide whether or not to take a chance on meeting face to face.

‘Hank and Asha’ is a subjectively told cross-cultural love story that explores themes of isolation, identity, and the universal appeal of entertaining life’s what-ifs.

== Cast ==
- Mahira Kakkar ... Asha
- Andrew Pastides ... Hank
- Bianca Butti ... Anne
- Brian Sloan ... Bartender

== Production ==
Husband-and-wife filmmakers James E. Duff and Julia Morrison produced the film while they were teaching at Prague Film School in the Czech Republic. It was shot in 11 days in Prague, and 10 days in New York, and the two lead actors never met during production.

== Release ==
The film played at 40 international film festivals including the Slamdance Film Festival, Rhode Island International Film Festival, BendFilm Festival, Heartland Film Festival, Savannah Film Festival, Indie Memphis, Thessaloniki International Film Festival, Napa Valley Film Festival, Ashland Independent Film Festival, and the RiverRun International Film Festival. It won 20 awards including 5 best narrative feature awards and 7 audience awards. The film had a limited theatrical release starting April 11, 2014, and was later released on DVD and digital platforms by FilmRise.

== Awards and nominations ==
Award	Year	Category	Recipient	Result
CINE Golden Eagle Award, Independent and Emerging Media	2015	Narrative Feature	James E. Duff, Julia Morrison	Won
Berkshire International Film Festival	2014	Audience Award Best Feature		Won
Ashland Independent Film Festival	2014	Best Feature		Won
RiverRun International Film Festival	2014	Altered States Award for Best Indie		Won
Prescott Film Festival	2014	Best Screenplay	James E. Duff, Julia Morrison	Won
Napa Valley Film Festival	2013	Grand Prize Best Narrative Feature	James E. Duff	Won
Napa Valley Film Festival	2013	Audience Award Best Actor	Andrew Pastides	Won
Napa Valley Film Festival	2013	Audience Award Best Actress	Mahira Kakkar	Won
Savannah Film Festival	2013	HBO Films Best Producer Award	James E. Duff, Julia Morrison	Won
Portland Film Festival	2013	Best Feature		Won
Rhode Island International Film Festival	2013	Best Feature First Prize		Won
Woods Hole Film Festival	2013	Directors’ Awards Cinematography Best Narrative Feature	Bianca Butti	Won
Slamdance Film Festival	2013	Audience Award Narrative Feature	James E. Duff	Won
BendFilm Festival	2013	Audience Award		Won
Brooklyn International Film Festival	2013	Best Producer	James E. Duff, Julia Morrison	Won
