= Hank Hazard =

2011 IOS video game

- Developer: Chillingo
- Publisher: Chillingo
- Platforms: iOS, Android
- Release: December 22, 2011

Hank Hazard is an iOS game developed by British studio Chillingo Ltd., and released on December 22, 2011. The main character, Hank is a hamster.

== Critical reception ==
The game has a Metacritic score of 86% based on 8 critic reviews.

Pocket Gamer gave it 4 out of 5 stars.
