= Hank Weidell =

American baseball player

- Pitcher
- Born: May 20, 1889; St. Paul, Minnesota, U.S.
- Died: January 9, 1950 (aged 60); Minneapolis, Minnesota, U.S.

Negro league baseball debut
- 1916, for the All Nations

Last appearance
- 1916, for the All Nations

Teams
- All Nations (1916)

Henry Weidell (May 20, 1889 – January 9, 1950), nicknamed "Bugs", was an American Negro league baseball pitcher in the 1910s.

A native of St. Paul, Minnesota, Weidell played for the All Nations club in 1916. He died in Minneapolis, Minnesota in 1950 at age 60.
