= Hank J. Ratner =

Hank Ratner
- Born: April 3, 1959 (age 67)
- Education: Emory University (BA, JD)
- Occupations: Media, Sports, Entertainment Telecommunications Executive

Hank J. Ratner (born April 3, 1959) is an American media, sports, entertainment and telecommunications executive. He was previously a vice chairman of Cablevision Systems Corporation, president and CEO of The Madison Square Garden Company (MSG), chief operating officer of AMC Networks (formerly Rainbow Media) and president and CEO of Independent Sports and Entertainment (ISE).

== Personal life ==
Ratner is a native New Yorker, born and raised on New York's Long Island. He received a bachelor's degree in 1981 and doctorate of law with distinction in 1984 from Emory University. Ratner met his wife in college and they have three children.

== Business ==
Prior to working in the media, sports, entertainment and telecommunications industries, Ratner was a corporate lawyer with the law firm of Sullivan & Cromwell from 1984 to 1987.

Ratner began working at AMC Networks in 1988 and spent nearly 15 years at AMC Networks, where he served in various positions including Chief Operating Officer.

Rather was appointed vice chairman of Cablevision in 2002. He was involved in numerous financings and strategic transactions, including, the spin-offs of MSG in 2010 and AMC Networks in 2011, both now standalone, public companies.

From 2009 to 2014, Ratner served as president and chief executive officer of the Madison Square Garden Company, whose business included, Madison Square Garden, The Theatre at Madison Square Garden, Radio City Music Hall, the Beacon Theatre, the Chicago Theater, the Wang Theater in Boston, the Forum in Inglewood, California, MSG Network, MSG Plus, Fuse, the New York Knickerbockers, the New York Rangers, the New York Liberty, the Hartford Wolfpack, the Radio City Christmas Spectacular and the Rockettes.

He presided over the three year, top-to-bottom $1 billion transformation of the iconic Madison Square Garden arena. He was also involved in MSG's marquee marketing partnership with JPMorgan Chase and the signature marketing partnerships with Delta, Coke and Anheuser Busch, and played a role in bringing the Beacon Theatre, the Chicago Theatre, the Wang Theatre and the Forum into the MSG system.

He served as alternate governor to the NBA and NHL on behalf of the New York Knicks and New York Rangers from 2003 to 2014.

Ratner serves on the board of directors of MSG Networks (NYSE: MSGN).

In May 2016, Hank Ratner became an investment partner with Tom Rogers, the chairman of TIVO, in WinView, a startup whose app lets sports fans compete for cash prizes and interact while watching games on live TV. The two executives have led a $3.4 million series A round for WinView and been named the co-Chairmen of the company.

From 2016 to 2018, Ratner was the CEO and President of Independent Sports and Entertainment (ISE), an integrated sports, media, entertainment and management company. ISE has more than 300 MLB, NFL and NBA players under management.

== Philanthropy ==
Ratner was involved in the creation of The Garden of Dreams Foundation, the nonprofit that works closely with all areas of MSG and MSG Networks to positively impact the lives of children facing obstacles. Since its inception in 2006, the Garden of Dreams Foundation has provided experiences for almost 300,000 children and their families, with access and interaction with events and celebrities at MSG and its properties.
