= Hank Morgan =

American basketball player (born 2002)

No. 4 – Maine Celtics
- Position: Small forward
- League: NBA G League

Personal information
- Born: July 19, 2002 (age 24) Caldwell, New Jersey, U.S.
- Listed height: 6 ft 5 in (1.96 m)
- Listed weight: 200 lb (91 kg)

Career information
- High school: Berkshire School (Sheffield, Massachusetts)
- College: Hamilton (2021–2025)
- NBA draft: 2025: undrafted
- Playing career: 2025–present

Career history
- 2025–2026: Salt Lake City Stars
- 2026–present: Maine Celtics

Career highlights
- First-team Division III All-American – NABC (2025); NESCAC Player of the Year (2025); 2× First-team All-NESCAC (2024, 2025)
- Stats at NBA.com
- Stats at Basketball Reference

Hank Morgan (born July 19, 2002) is an American professional basketball player for the Maine Celtics of the NBA G League. He played college basketball for the Hamilton Continentals.

== Early life ==
Morgan was born on July 19, 2002 in Caldwell, New Jersey.

He attended high school at the Berkshire School in Massachusetts.

== College career ==
Morgan played college basketball at Hamilton College, an NCAA Division III program competing in the NESCAC conference.

As a freshman in 2021-22, Morgan appeared in 13 games and made 4 starts for Hamilton, averaging 9.3 points per game.

In his sophomore year in 2022-23, he started in all 29 games he played and averaged 14.0 points per game.

In the 2023-24 season as a junior, Morgan started in 25 games and averaged 18.7 points per game. Morgan was named to the 2024 All-NESCAC First Team.

In Morgan’s senior year with Hamilton in 2024-25, he averaged 21.8 points per game in his 27 games started. Morgan was named as the 2025 NESCAC Player of the Year and earned All-NESCAC First Team honors for a second straight year.

Morgan was named as a 2025 National Association of Basketball Coaches First Team D3 All-American and D3hoops.com second team All-American.

== Playing career ==
In June 2025, Morgan went undrafted in the 2025 NBA draft.

In November 2025, Morgan was named to the Salt Lake City Stars 2025 opening night roster after participating in the Stars open tryout. At the time he was the only current NBA G League player to come from an NCAA Division III college.

In February 2026, Morgan joined the Maine Celtics of the NBA G League.

In July 2026, Morgan joined the Boston Celtics for the 2026 NBA Summer League in Las Vegas. On September 11, 2026, Morgan signed with Boston, but was waived by the team the same day.
