= The Blue Dogs (band) =

South Carolina based band

Blue Dogs
- Origin: Charleston, South Carolina, United States
- Genres: Americana; country rock; roots rock
- Years active: 1987–present
- Label: Black River
- Members: Bobby Houck; Hank Futch; Greg Walker; Dan Hood; Charlie Thompson
- Website: bluedogs.com

The Blue Dogs are a band formed in 1987 by Bobby Houck and Hank Futch, based in Charleston, South Carolina. Known for their American roots sound and interactive performances, the band has become a staple in southern live entertainment and the Americana scene.

== History ==
=== Early years ===
Having known each other since their cub scout days in their hometown of Florence, South Carolina, Houck and Futch started the Blue Dogs as an acoustic oriented act rooted in bluegrass and country covers while attending Davidson College and College of Charleston, respectively. While they played periodically during their college years, the band began getting a following after spending the summers of 1986 and 1987 at Pawleys Island / Myrtle Beach.

Upon graduating in 1987, Houck moved to Richmond, VA where he continued to perform gigs as the Blue Dogs with SAE Fraternity brothers Buck Bradberry and Chris Holden. Once Holden moved to NYC, Houck and Bradberry were joined by Futch in 1988 and continued to play throughout the Charlottesville, VA area as the Blue Dogs.

At a gig opening for Jerry Jeff Walker at Mineshaft in Charlottesville, VA, the Blue Dogs were asked to open for Indecision, managed by Danny McCrystal who caught the show.

In 1990, Bradberry moved on from the band and was replaced by Phillip Lammonds, multi-instrumentalist from Georgetown, SC and Futch’s KA fraternity brother at College of Charleston. They continued to play throughout the Southeast and prepared to record their first record.

=== 1990–2000 ===
“Music For Dog People”, the Blue Dogs’ first record, was recorded live in the studio at Online Audio in Charleston, SC, in one day. It was released independently in the fall of 1991, on cassette tape only. Greg Walker officially joined the band in 1992. Walker, Houck, Futch, and Lammonds record “Soul Dogfood” at Oceansong Recording Studios in Charleston, SC in 1993, released on cassette tape in the fall and re-released on CD in the spring of 1994. The band continued to tour throughout the Southeast during these years, recording a live show at the Dock Street Theatre in Charleston, SC in August 1995. “Live at the Dock Street Theatre” was released on CD in December of that year.

In April 1996, the Blue Dogs first opened for Hootie & The Blowfish on the eve of the release of their second album, “Fairweather Johnson”. The band was the sole opener for the free show in Finlay Park in Columbia, SC, attended by 25,000 people. Before Phillip Lammonds left the band in 1997, the band recorded their next album, “Blue Dogs” at the Washington DC studio of producer John Alagia (Vertical Horizon, Dave Matthews Band, John Mayer) for a March release. It became Millennium Music’s (Charleston, SC) single best selling CD of 1997.

David Stewart (guitar) and Evans Nicholson (drums) joined the band in the spring of 1998. Together, the band recorded three live shows in 1998, one of which became the live recording “For the Record (Live at the Handlebar)”, mixed and mastered by Danny McMcrystal and released in early 1999. While on break from touring, the band traveled to Richmond, VA to finish writing and recording for their next album, “Letters From Round O”, produced by David Lowery (Cracker) in his Sound of Music Studio and released in October 1999.

“Letters From Round O” received national attention, but the band’s touring schedule slowed down and Houck moved to New York City in 2000. Despite living in different places, the Blue Dogs continued to have their music aired on radio stations in Charleston, SC especially. 96 Wave submitted the band into a nationwide contest run by radio promoters to highlight unsigned bands and increase their exposure in 2001. The Blue Dogs’ fan base launched them to the final round, earning them a spot to perform in New York City. The show in New York City was booked for September 8, 2001, at the legendary CBGB.

=== 2001–2012 ===
The Blue Dogs' seventh release, Live at the Florence Little Theater, was recorded in 1998 but didn't actually come out until 2002. 2004’s Halos and Good Buys, was produced by Don Gehman (John Mellencamp, R.E.M., Hootie & the Blowfish, Pat Green). In January 2005, Live at Workplay, a live CD released later in 2006, was recorded at the Birmingham, Alabama concert venue of the same name. Produced by Bruce Hornsby guitarist and veteran producer Doug Derryberry. In 2008, to mark their 20th anniversary, the Blue Dogs released a DVD of a live performance in their hometown, recorded in a 200-year-old theatre called the Dock Street Theatre. On Thanksgiving Day 2008, Live at the Dock Street Theatre...again (Black River label) was made available including guest appearances by friends and established South Carolina musicians: Blue Dogs songwriter Phillip Lammonds, Tommy Dew and Kevin Wadley from the Charleston, SC band The Archetypes, Danielle Howle, mandolin player Daren Shumaker, and the Adande African Drum and Dance Company featuring former Blue Dogs percussionist (‘97-’98) Jesse Thrower.

=== 2013–present ===
After 25 years together the Blue Dogs celebrated with a two-set performance at the Charleston Music Hall where guests and friends paid tribute to the band. Darius Rucker was joined onstage by his band mates from Hootie & the Blowfish, Edwin McCain performed and sang on two songs. Nashville songwriter Radney Foster performed with the band two songs that he co-wrote with lead singer Bobby Houck. There were also appearances by other South Carolina musicians including Cravin’ Melon's Doug Jones, Dangermuffin's Dan Lotti, Danielle Howle, Mac Leaphart and John Satterfield, as well as former past members of the Blue Dogs. This event has now become an annual tradition for the band and their fan base.

The band continues to perform live having shared the stage with artists such as Willie Nelson, Widespread Panic, Bruce Hornsby, Hootie & the Blowfish and more. They performed the national anthem on NBC at the final Southern 500 NASCAR race in Darlington, SC in 2004, and in 2007 they were the house band for a week on Wheel of Fortune television show.

== Charity work ==
The band is affiliated with the Medical University of South Carolina's Children's Hospital as a charity partner, (MUSC). Funds from their annual Music Hall shows and an additional Sunday morning "songwriter in the round" brunch directly benefit MUSC's Children's Hospital rebuilding efforts.

== Members ==
=== Current ===
- Bobby Houck – Lead vocals, Acoustic guitar, Harmonica (1987–present)
- Hank Futch – Vocals, Upright bass, (1987–present)
- Charlie Thompson – Pedal Steel
- Dan Hood – Guitar
- Greg Walker – Drums, Percussion

=== Collaborators and past members ===
- Parker Dewitt
- James Bernabe
- Phillip Lammonds
- Evans Nicholson
- Daren Shumaker
- David Stewart
- Jason Hawthorn
- Doug Wanamaker
- Jamie Harper
- Buck Bradberry
- Chris Holden
- Bob Sachs

== Discography ==
=== Studio albums ===
- Music For Dog People (1991)
- Soul Dogfood (1993)
- Blue Dogs (1997)
- Letters From Round O (1999)
- Halos And Good Buys (2004)
- Big Dreamers (2022)

=== Live albums ===
- Live At The Dock Street Theater (1995)
- For The Record (Live at the Handlebar) (1999)
- Live At The Florence Little Theatre (2001)
- Live At Workplay (2006)

=== Compilations ===
- Aware 5 - The Compilation CD (1997)
- Country Fried Rock Vol. 2 (2013)

=== Soundtracks ===
- Luckytown (2000)

=== Videos ===
- Live at the House of Blues (2004)
- Live at the Dock Street Theatre...again (2008)
