= Hank Elespuru =

American athlete, coach, and official (1923–2004)

Biographical details
- Born: March 4, 1923; Blackfoot, Idaho, U.S.
- Died: January 14, 2004 (aged 80); Sacramento, California, U.S.

Playing career

Football
- 1946–1948: Vermont
- Position: Wide receiver

Coaching career (HC unless noted)

Football
- 1950–1951: Bates (assistant)
- 1952–1954: Wesleyan (assistant)
- 1955–1958: Sacramento State (assistant)
- 1960–1969: Sacramento State (assistant)

Men's basketball
- 1950–1952: Bates

Wrestling
- 1952–1954: Wesleyan
- 1970–1983: Sacramento State

Boxing
- 1955–1959: Sacramento State

Henry Elespuru (March 4, 1923 – January 14, 2004) was an American athlete, coach, and official who was the head boxing and wrestling coach at Sacramento State University and the referee for over 40 championship boxing matches.

== Early life ==
Elespuru was born on March 4, 1923, in Blackfoot, Idaho. He grew up in Great Falls, Montana and attended Great Falls High School, where he lettered in football, baseball, basketball, and track. He also wrestled and boxed outside of school. He continued his education at the University of Montana, where he played football and basketball.

During World War II, Elespuru served in the United States Navy. He played football and basketball at the Bainbridge Naval Base. From 1943 to 1945, he was a physical education instructor and assistant track and basketball coach at the Navy school at Columbia University. He then served as director of physical education and basketball coach for the Stevens Institute of Technology V-12 Navy College Training Program. After the war, he resumed his education at the University of Vermont, where he was a wide receiver on the Vermont Catamounts football team and an outfielder on the school's baseball team. He graduated in 1949 and worked towards as master's degree at Columbia.

== Coaching ==
In 1950, Elespuru became the head basketball coach and assistant football coach at Bates College. Over two seasons, he compiled an overall record of 7–37. In 1952, he became the head wrestling coach and football line coach at Wesleyan University.

In 1955, Elespuru moved to Sacramento State University, where he was an assistant football and track coach and established the school's boxing program. Under his leadership, the Hornets became one of the top boxing programs in the country. Jim Flood won individual championships in 1957 and 1958 and Terry Smith won the 156-pound weight class title in 1959. The following year, the Sacramento State discontinued boxing following the death of Wisconsin boxer Charlie Mohr. From 1970 to 1983, he coached Sacramento State's wrestling team, during which time he developed fourteen All-Americans.

== Officiating ==
Elespuru began officiating amateur bouts in 1961 and professional fights in 1968. He was a referee or judge for over 40 world title fights, including Salvador Sánchez vs. Wilfredo Gómez, Jeff Fenech vs. Carlos Zárate, Zárate vs. Alberto Dávila, Lloyd Honeyghan vs. Jorge Vaca, Julio Cesar Chavez vs. Roger Mayweather, David Tua vs. Ike Ibeabuchi, John John Molina vs. Tony Lopez, Yaqui López vs. Carlos De Leon. He also refereed George Foreman's comeback fight against Steve Zouski.

== Personal life ==
Elespuru died on January 14, 2004 in Sacramento, California. He was survived by his wife and two children.
