= Hank Monis =

- Birth name: Henry Monis
- Born: May 24, 1923; Fall River, Massachusetts, U.S.
- Died: November 21, 2011 (aged 88); Toronto, Ontario, Canada
- Occupation: Studio musician
- Instrument: Guitar

Henry (Hank) Monis (May 24, 1923 – November 21, 2011) was a Toronto-based studio musician. Over his career he worked for the CBC, performed on many albums, and worked as a guitar teacher.

Monis was born in Fall River, Massachusetts. He was the second youngest of seven brothers and sisters. He fought in World War II as a bombardier. After the war, he moved to New York City to pursue his musical career. He married a Canadian, Jean Cameron, and ended up settling in Toronto. He was the father of five children, and his two sons also became musicians.

== Selected works ==
He played guitar on the children's shows Mr. Dressup and Polkadot Door, and wrote music for Sesame Street. He played on the Expo 67 songs "Canada" and "A Place To Stand." He also played banjo on The Stampeders' 1971 studio recording of "Sweet City Woman," and guitar on the Bobby Edwards album Fat City Suites in E Major. Hank also instructed Canadian music composer Bob Ezrin in jazz guitar.

Monis is identified as a prominent jazz guitarist in the Encyclopedia of Music in Canada.
