= Hank Shanks =

American baseball player

- First baseman
- Born: March 5, 1900; Jacksonville, Florida, U.S.
- Died: March 24, 1975 (aged 75)

Negro league baseball debut
- 1927, for the Birmingham Black Barons

Last appearance
- 1927, for the Birmingham Black Barons
- Stats at Baseball Reference

Teams
- Birmingham Black Barons (1927)

Hank Shanks (March 5, 1900 – March 24, 1975) was an American Negro league first baseman who played in the 1920s.

Shanks played for the Birmingham Black Barons in 1927. In nine recorded games, he posted six hits and two RBI in 25 plate appearances.
