= Hank Janson =

Hank Janson is both a fictional character and a pseudonym created by the English author Stephen Daniel Frances who died in 1989. Frances wrote a series of thrillers by, and often featuring, Hank Janson, beginning with When Dames Get Tough (1946). Many of the later "Hank Janson" novels were the work of other authors.

== The "Hank Janson" books ==
Hank Janson was the most popular and successful of British pulp fiction authors of the 1940s and 1950s. His books were violent "pseudo-American" thrillers sold in paperback editions featuring erotic cover art, and it is estimated that some five million copies were sold by 1954.

Recalling his childhood enthusiasm for Janson, British playwright Simon Gray recalled how "the titles alone drove my blood wild—Torment for Trixy—Hotsy, You'll be Chilled—and on the cover a vivid blonde, blouse ripped, skirt hitched up to her thighs, struggling sweetly against chains, ropes and a gag—and in the top right hand corner, set in a small circle, like a medallion, the silhouette presumably of Hank himself, trench coat open, trilby tilted back, a cigarette hanging from the corner of his mouth."

In the 1950s, the authorities attempted a crack-down on allegedly obscene pulp literature, targeting the Janson books among others. Several of the Hank Janson novels were banned in the Republic of Ireland. In 1954 author, D. F. Crawley was prosecuted, only to be acquitted when it was discovered he no longer had rights to the Janson pseudonym.

=== Authors ===
partial list

- Stephen D. Frances (sole author 1946–1953, occasional 1954–1959)
- D. F. Crawley
- Robert Maguire
- Harry Hobson (circa 1963)
- Victor George Charles Norwood (circa 1964)

== The "Hank Janson" character ==
The Janson character in the novels was portrayed as a "tough Chicago reporter". Alternatively, in some of the novels, Janson is said to have been born in England, to have left the country in his teens, later obtaining American nationality and working as an assistant to a private detective.

== Works ==
- When Dames Get Tough (1946)
- Gun Moll for Hire (1948)
- This Woman Is Death (1948)
- Lady, Mind That Corpse (1948)
- Blonde on the Spot (1949)
- Angel Shoot to Kill (1949)
- Gunsmoke in Her Eyes (1949)
- Honey Take My Gun (1949)
- Smart Girls Don't Talk (1949)
- Slay-Ride for Cutie (1949)
- No Regrets for Clara (1949)
- Sweetheart Here's Your Grave! (1949)
- Lilies for My Lovely (1949)
- Some Look Better Dead (1950)
- The Bride Wore Weeds (1950)
- Don't Dare Me Sugar (1950)
- Torment for Trixy (1950)
- The Jane with Green Eyes (1950)
- The Lady Has a Scar (1950)
- Lady Toll the Bell (1950)
- Lola Brought Her Wreath (1950)
- Baby, Don't Dare Squeal (1951)
- Death Wore a Petticoat (1951)
- Don't Mourn Me Toots (1951)
- This Dame Dies Soon (1951)
- Hotsy You'll Be Chilled (1951)
- Sister Don't Hate Me (1951)
- It's Always Eve That Weeps (1951)
- Broads Don't Scare Easy (1951)
- Frails Can Be So Tough (1951)
- Women Hate Till Death (1951)
- Milady Took the Rap (1951)
- Auctioned (1952)
- Kill Her If You Can (1952)
- Conflict (1952)
- Murder (1952)
- Skirts Bring Me Sorrow (1952)
- Whiplash (1952)
- Sadie Don't Cry Now (1952)
- The Filly Wore Red (1952)
- Sweetie Hold Me Tight (1952)
- Tension (1952)
- Accused (1952)
- Suspense (1952)
- Persian Pride (1952)
- Desert Fury (1953)
- One Man in His Time (1953)
- Avenging Nymph (1953)
- Deadly Mission (1955)
- Contraband (1955)
- 48 Hours (1955)
- Menace (1955)
- Tomorrow and a Day (1955)
- Framed (1955)
- One against time (1955/1956)
- Devil's Highway (1956)
- The Unseen Assassin (1956)
- Escape (1956)
- Hell's Angel (1956)
- Sinister Rapture (1957)
- Amorous Captive (1958)
- Don't Scare Easy (1958)
- Flight from Fear (1958)
- Hate As Above (1958)
- Lose This Gun (1958)
- Mistress of Fear (1958)
- Sugar and Vice (1958)
- Situation—Grave! (1958)
- Kill This Man (1958)
- Invasion (1959)
- Sultry Avenger (1959)
- Silken Snare (1959)
- Jack Spot (1959)
- Bad Girl (1959)
- Torrid Temptress (1959)
- Wild Girl (1959)
- Beloved Traitor (1960)
- Come Quickly, Honey (1960)
- Cool Sugar (1960)
- Quiet Waits the Grave (1960)
- Passionate Waif (1960)
- Secret Session (1960)
- Sentence for Sin (1960)
- Cutie on Call (1960)
- This Hood for Hire (1960)
- Ripe for Rapture (1960)
- Ecstasy (1960)
- Break for a Lovely (1961)
- Crowns Can Kill (1961)
- She Sleeps to Conquer (1961)
- Delicious Danger (1961)
- Reluctant Hostess (1961)
- Suddenly It's Sin (1961)
- Venus Makes Three (1961)
- Scent from Heaven (1961)
- Destination Dames (1961)
- Downtown Doll (1961)
- Fireball (1961)
- Hell's Belles (1961)
- Short Term wife (1961)
- Prey for a Newshawk (1961)
- Outcast (1961)
- Janson Go Home (1961)
- Lady Lie Low (1961)
- Late Night Revel (1961)
- Master Mind (1961)
- Angel Astray (1962)
- Beauty and the Beat (1962)
- Blood Bath (1962)
- Grape Vine (1962)
- Chicago Chick (1962)
- Nymph in the Night (1962)
- Uncover Agent (1962)
- Uncommon Market (1962)
- Twist for Two (1962)
- Vagabond Vamp (1962)
- Way Out Wanton (1962)
- Counter-Feat (1962)
- Savage Sequel (1962)
- Run for Lover (1962)
- Crime on My Hands (1962)
- Take This Sweetie (1962)
- Rave for a Roughneck (1962)
- Play It Casual (1962)
- Dig Those Heels (1962)
- Exclusive (1962)
- Honey for Me (1962)
- Like Lethal (1962)
- Like Crazy (1962)
- Like Poison (1962)
- Kill Me for Kicks (1962)
- Brand Image (1963)
- Dateline Darlene (1963)
- Dateline Debbie (1963)
- Strange Ritual (1963)
- Dateline Diane (1963)
- Visit from a Broad (1963)
- Daughter of Shame (1963)
- Fast Buck (1963)
- Go with a Jerk (1963)
- Passion Pact (1963)
- Heartache (1963)
- V for Vitality (1963)
- Hilary's Terms (1963)
- Playgirl (1963)
- Second String (1963)
- Nerve Centre (1963)
- Hot Line (1963)
- The Love Makers (1963)
- I for Intrigue (1963)
- Gold Star Books (1963–1965)
1. Kill Her with Passion (1963)
2. Lover (1963)
3. Brazen Seductress (1963)
4. A Nice Way to Die (1963)
5. It's Bedtime Baby! (1964)
6. Hell's Angels (1964)
7. Hot House (1964)
8. Passionate Playmates (1964)
9. Her Weapon Is Passion (1964)
10. Cold Dead Coed (1964)
11. Fanny (1964)
12. Expectant Nymph (1964)
13. The Exotic Seductress (1964)
14. The Sexy Vixen (1964)
15. The Affairs of Paula (1965)
16. A Nympho Named Silvia (1965)
17. Becky (1965)
- Crime Beat Crisis (1964)
- Design for Dupes (1964)
- Doctor Fix (1964)
- Double Take (1964)
- Fan Fare (1964)
- Top Ten (1964)
- Flower of Desire (1964)
- Tigress (1964)
- A Girl in Hand (1964)
- Voodoo Violence (1964)
- Will-Power (1964)
- Limbo Lover (1964)
- Pattern of Rape (1964)
- Square One (1964)
- Lake Loot (1964)
- Soft Cargo (1964)
- Sex Angle (1964)
- That Brain Again (1964)
- The Love Secretaries (1964)
- The Last Lady (1964)
- Abomination (1965)
- Junk Market (1965)
- Tail Sting (1965)
- Sweet Talk (1965)
- Lust for Vengeance (1965)
- Flashpoint (1965)
- Backlash of Infamy (1965)
- Jazz Jungle (1965)
- Catch Me a Renegade (1965)
- Devil and the Deep (1965)
- Missile Mob (1965)
- Why Should Sylvia? (1965)
- Say It with Candy (1965)
- Roxy by Proxy (1965)
- Model in Mayhem (1965)
- Furtive Flame (1965)
- Bid for Beauty (1966)
- The Big H (1966)
- Darling Delinquent (1966)
- Dead Certainty (1966)
- Make Mine Mink (1966)
- Escalation (1966)
- F.EUD. (1966)
- Mayfair Slayride (1966)
- Nefarious Quest (1966)
- Helldorado (1966)
- Krush (1966)
- Liquor is Quicker (1966)
- Ladybirds Are In (1967)
- Physical Attraction (1967)
- Riviera Showdown (1967)
- Zero Take All (1967)
- Operation Obliterate (1967)
- Casinopoly (1968)
- Same Difference (1968)
- The Young Wolves (1968)
