= William Hank =

William Edwin Hank
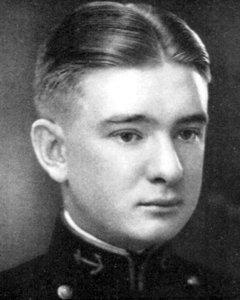
- Born: September 25, 1902; Norfolk, Virginia, US
- Died: November 14, 1942 (aged 40) near Savo Island
- Allegiance: United States
- Branch: United States Navy
- Service years: 1925–1942
- Rank: Lieutenant Commander
- Commands: USS Laffey (DD-459)
- Conflicts: World War II: Battle of Cape Esperance; Naval Battle of Guadalcanal
- Awards: Navy Cross (2); Purple Heart

Lieutenant Commander William Edwin Hank (25 September 1902 – 14 November 1942) was an officer in the United States Navy during World War II.

Born at Norfolk, Virginia, Hank graduated from the Naval Academy in 1925. During the years before World War II, he served at various shore stations and in USS New York (CA-2), USS Hull (DD-350), and USS Saratoga (CV-3).

Commissioned a lieutenant commander in 1940, Hank took command of Laffey (DD-459) 1 April 1942. He received the Navy Cross for his skillful handling of the ship during the Battle of Cape Esperance.

Hank received a second Navy Cross for heroism during the Naval Battle of Guadalcanal 12–13 November. As Laffey fought the Japanese battleship Hiei, she was sunk by large caliber gunfire and a torpedo. Lieutenant Commander Hank was reported missing and presumed dead 14 November. His ship received the Presidential Unit Citation and he was awarded his second Navy Cross.

USS Hank (DD-702) was named for him, and USS Laffey (DD-724) was named for his ship.
