= Hank Williams (disambiguation) =

Hank Williams (1923–1953) was an American singer-songwriter and musician.

Hank Williams may also refer to:

- Hank Williams Jr. (born 1949), American country singer-songwriter and musician, son of Hank Williams Sr.
- Hank Williams III (born 1972), singer, drummer, bassist, and guitarist, son of Hank Williams Jr.
- Hank Williams (basketball) (born 1952), American professional basketball player
- Hank Williams (Tahltan man), a Tahltan man from British Columbia, Canada

== See also ==
- Hank Williams First Nation, a 2005 Canadian film
- "Honk Williams", a bonus track (about the musician) from the album It Doesn't Matter Anymore
