= Hank Schubart =

American architect (1916–1998)

Henry Allen Schubart, Jr. (15 August 1916 – 8 February 1998) was an American-Canadian architect. Schubart's career was divided into two periods: the San Francisco period, spanning from 1953 to 1968, and the Salt Spring Island period, spanning from 1968 to 1995. Schubart is best known for the residential architecture he designed on Salt Spring Island, a body of work consisting of over 230 projects.

== Biography ==
Hank Schubart was born on 15 August 1916 in New York City to Henry Schubart and Pauline Werner, the first of two sons. Hank's brother Mark was born in 1918. Henry Sr. was a businessman and Pauline an artist. Growing up in New York, Schubart attended Horace Mann School. In 1929 the family moved to France, where Hank attended the Lycée Léonard de Vinci d'Antibes, and later the École des Beaux-Arts. In 1932 the family returned to the United States, settling again in New York. Shortly after their return, Henry and Pauline divorced. This resulted in Hank not speaking to his father for a long period of time.

After receiving from his aunt Adelaide Werner a copy of Frank Lloyd Wright's An Autobiography, Schubart became inspired to study architecture. Shortly after, Schubart found in the New York Times an advertisement for Wright's new fellowship programme at Taliesin. Schubart wrote his first letter to Wright in August 1932, introducing himself and expressing his enthusiasm about the internship. After a year passed, Schubart again wrote to Wright, this time asking for specifics about the programme. Although the internship involved paying tuition, Wright waived this requirement and allowed Schubart to enter without cost. On 8 September 1933, Schubart left New York for Spring Green.

Schubart spent the next year at Taliesin, learning drafting from Wright and, like all other interns, doing labour work at the estate. The relationship between Schubart and the master was often contentions, with Wright feeling that Schubart lacked maturity. In August 1934, Schubart left Taliesin to work as a draftsman for the Joint Assyrian Expedition, travelling to Mosul, Iraq. Schubart remained in the Middle East until the summer of 1935, spending time in Iraq, Syria, Turkey, Palestine, and Egypt. Upon returning stateside, Schubart wrote extensively to Wright, asking to be allowed to return to Taliesin. Wright expressed reservations about Schubart's character, and stated that a return would only be possible by paying tuition. Not having the money, Schubart began his career as a draftsman in New York.

In 1936 Schubart married Barbara Joseph. The couple moved to Los Angeles, only remaining for a short time. This first marriage produced two daughters, Mallory and Linda. Schubart and Joseph divorced in 1941. With the United States' entrance into the Second World War in December 1941, Schubart took a job with the Navy working in a ship yard in Kentucky. Schubart moved there with a woman he met in New York, Lilo Hemp, who was a German refugee. The couple married in 1943 and divorced in 1945, not having had any children.

Returning to New York after the War ended, Schubart met Margaret "Maggie" O'Connell. The couple married in early 1947. Schubart at this time was interested in pursuing a career as an architect, but was unable to do so in New York without a degree. In California, however, one could obtain an architectural licence with ten years of drafting experience, so the Schubarts moved to San Francisco. In 1948, Schubart became a licensed architect and began working with the firm Wurster Bernardi and Evans, where he would stay until 1953.

In 1953, Schubart and Howard Friedman (1917-1988), another Wurster employee, left the firm to found their own practice, Schubart and Friedman, with offices at 52 Vallejo Street. Later in his career, Friedman would become the head of the architecture department at the University of California, Berkeley. The firm lasted until 1968, and its most significant project was a new campus for the San Domenico School, located in Sleepy Hollow. Another significant Schubart project was a house he designed for photographer Pirkle Jones, located in Marin County.

Hank and Maggie had had five sons - Peter, Michael, Matthew, Daniel, and Paul - and by the late 1960s were growing nervous about the potential of their sons being drafted into the Vietnam War. In 1967, Hank received a commission from a couple wanting to build a house on Salt Spring Island in British Columbia. Schubart traveled to the Island, and upon his return decided that his family would move there. On 26 March 1968, the Schubart family entered Canada, where they would make their home.

Schubart worked to establish himself and his architectural practice on the Island. The family built a house of their own, calling it "Monument." Schubart would later build a smaller house for Maggie and himself, naming it the "Miniment." Throughout the 1970s, Schubart acquired numerous residential commissions on Salt Spring and built a reputation for himself. In addition to his houses, he also worked on several public buildings. Schubart designed houses for numerous famous clients, including Stuart Margolin and Robert Bateman. One of Schubart's most important patrons was the wealthy Kaiser family. Schubart's first work for a family member was a house for Becky Kaiser located on Orcas Island. This led to a house for Edgar Kaiser, Sr. in Eleuthera, The Bahamas, and two houses for Edgar Kaiser, Jr., both located on Belmont Avenue in Vancouver. In total, Schubart worked on over ten projects for various members of the family.

The Schubart style was heavily influenced by Frank Lloyd Wright's prairie style, although was highly unique. Defining traits of Schubart houses included the use of exposed cedar, large windows, and skylights. In 1995 Schubart sold his practice to his apprentice Robert Barnard. After that time, he worked on a limited basis as a consultant. On 8 February 1998 Schubart died of a heart attack at his home.
