= Henry Elkins =

American civil rights advocate

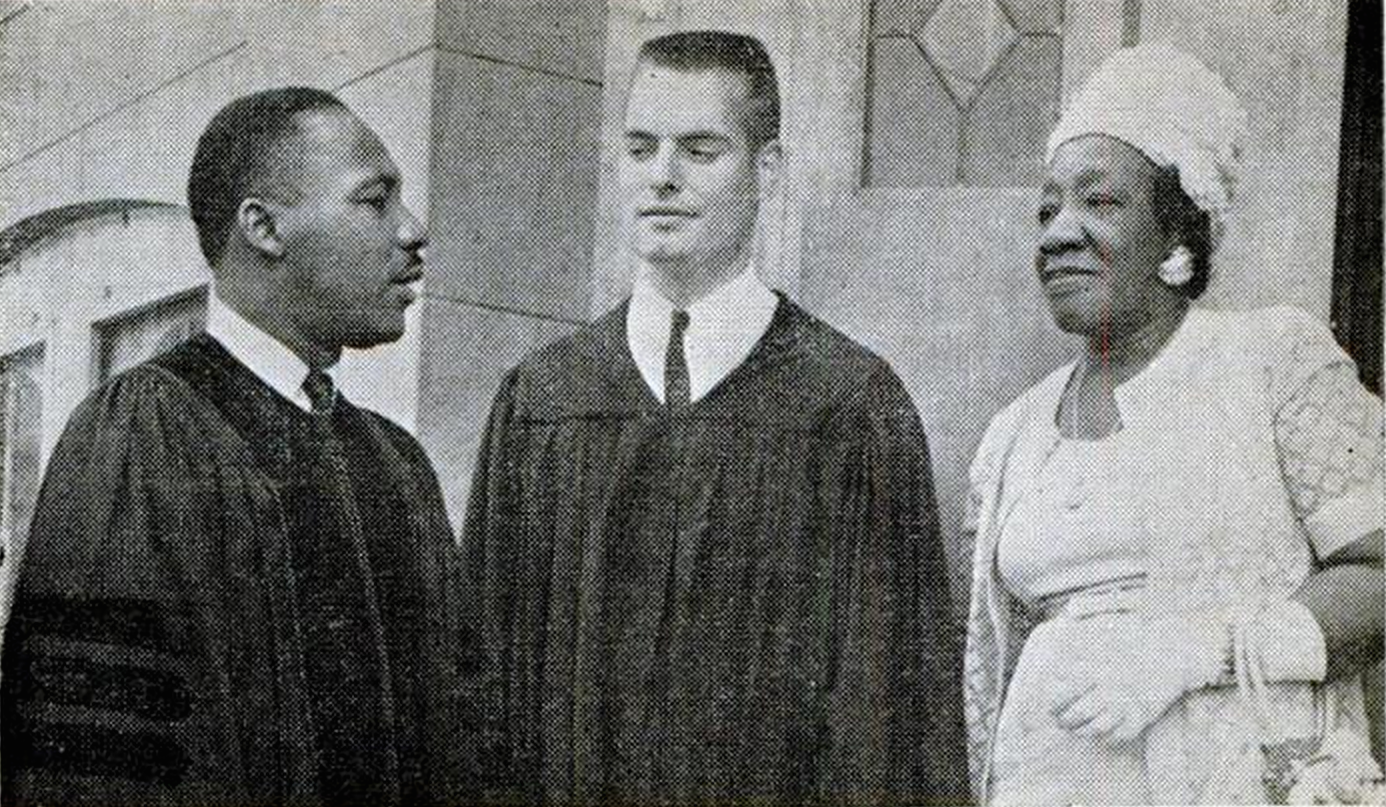
- Martin Luther King Jr. (left), Elkins (cente), and Alberta Williams King (right) at Ebeneezer, 1962
- Born: February 13, 1937 (age 89)
- Education: Yale University (BA); Southeastern Baptist Theological Seminary (BDiv); University of Chicago (PhD)

Henry G. Elkins Jr. (also known as Hank Elkins) (born February 13, 1937) is best known for his early work in the civil rights movement. In the early 1960s Elkins served as assistant pastor to Martin Luther King Jr. at Ebenezer Baptist Church. He lived with the King family and helped lead civil rights activities. In the early 1970s Elkins switched career paths and became an American Public Health and International Development scholar at Columbia University and then worked with the Population Council and USAID.

== Education ==
Elkins graduated from Yale University in 1959 with a B.A. in History. He earned a B.D. in divinity from Southeast Seminary in 1962. Later Elkins switched from ministry and earned a Ph.D. in Sociology from the University of Chicago in 1972.

== Civil rights work ==
In the early 1960s, Elkins was active in the Civil Rights Movement and worked closely with the Reverend Martin Luther King Jr. Elkins served as Dr. King's assistant pastor at the Ebenezer Baptist Church in Atlanta in 1962, during which time he lived with the King family.

Elkins lived and worked with King during the Albany Movement, an early stage in the civil rights era. King's autobiography and other sources describe Elkins' visits to King in the Albany Jail, to provide reading material and brief King on ongoing protests.

After King's release, King and others were disappointed with what they viewed as the city's reneging on promises of integration. In response to Albany Police Chief Laurie Pritchett's closing of white-only parks following integration efforts, Reverend Elkins (who was Caucasian) teamed up with black Reverend Joseph Smith and William Kunstler to lead an integrated group to Albany's black-only Carver Park to swim and play tennis. Police Chief Pritchett's reaction -- "Call up Carver and have that closed too"—was notable in that it established a similar approach to black-and white-only establishments.

In 1963, following his stint at Ebenezer Baptist Church, Elkins became the director of the United Christian Campus Ministry at North Carolina College (since renamed North Carolina Central University), an historically black college, in Durham, NC. He also worked as director of the school's branch of the United Southern Christian Fellowship Foundation. There he helped lead non-violent protests and sit-ins at whites-only establishments in the Raleigh-Durham area.

== Career in academia and international development ==
After his civil rights and ministerial work, Reverend Elkins entered the doctoral program in sociology at the University of Chicago, where he studied under demographer Donald J. Bogue and published papers together. Following dissertation work in Bogota, Colombia, Dr. Elkins became a research scientist at Columbia University in the Department of Public Health. He later moved to the Population Council and then to Management Sciences for Health. He worked as a public health specialist and demographer in many parts of the developing world.
