= USS Hank =

Allen M. Sumner-class destroyer

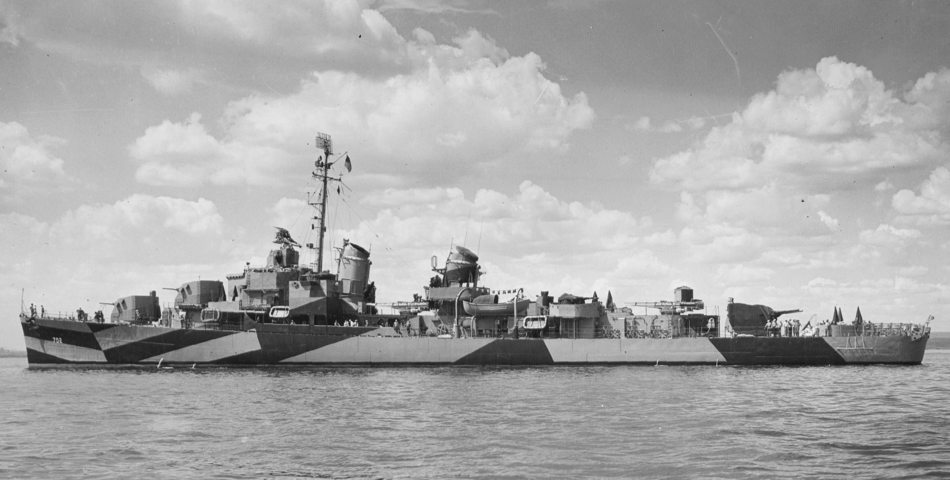
- USS Hank

History

United States
- Laid down: 17 January 1944
- Launched: 21 May 1944
- Commissioned: 28 August 1944
- Decommissioned: 1 July 1972
- Stricken: 1 July 1972
- Fate: To Argentina 1 July 1972

Argentina
- Name: Segui
- Acquired: 1 July 1972
- Stricken: Stricken in 1983
- Fate: Broken up for scrap in 1983.

General characteristics
- Class & type: Allen M. Sumner class destroyer
- Displacement: 2,200 tons
- Length: 376 ft 6 in (114.8 m)
- Beam: 40 ft (12.2 m)
- Draft: 15 ft 8 in (4.8 m)
- Propulsion: 60,000 shp (45 MW); 2 propellers
- Speed: 34 knots (63 km/h)
- Range: 6500 nm @ 15 kn (12,000 km @ 28 km/h)
- Complement: 336
- Armament: 6 × 5-inch 38 caliber guns, 12 × 40 mm AA guns, 11 × 20 mm AA guns, 10 × 21 inch (533 mm) torpedo tubes, 6 × depth charge projectors, 2 × depth charge tracks

USS Hank (DD-702), an Allen M. Sumner-class destroyer, was named for Lieutenant Commander William Hank.

== Construction and commissiong ==
Hank was launched on 21 May 1944 by the Federal Shipbuilding and Drydock Company at Kearny, New Jersey, sponsored by Mrs. William Edwin Hank, widow of Lieutenant Commander Hank, and was commissioned on 28 August 1944.

== Service history ==
=== World War II ===
After completing her Caribbean shakedown on 18 October, Hank joined Missouri, Texas, and Arkansas at New York and then sailed for the Pacific reaching Pearl Harbor on 6 December via the Panama Canal and San Francisco. Hank reported to Ulithi on 28 December and sortied 2 days later as part of the screen for Task Force 38, a fast carrier force under Vice Admiral John S. McCain, Sr. The primary mission of the carriers was to conduct air strikes against strategic Japanese positions along the China coast and on Formosa and Luzon to distract enemy attention and to divert Japanese ships from the landings at Lingayen Gulf which were to begin on 9 January 1945. The day after the invasion was launched, Task Force 38 moved into the South China Sea to conduct a series of devastating raids on targets along the China Coast and in Indochina. After launching one final raid against Okinawa, the carriers and escorts, Hank included, returned to Ulithi on 26 January 1945.

Joining Task Force 58, a reorganized fast carrier strike force under the command of Admiral Marc Mitscher, Hank sortied on 10 February. Carrier planes launched massive raids against airfields, aircraft factories, and shipping in the Tokyo area 16 and 17 February in paralyzing diversionary strikes prior to the invasion of Iwo Jima, on 19 February. These raids, launched less than 125 miles (201 km) from Tokyo Bay itself, were the first carrier air strikes to hit Japan proper since the Doolittle Raid of 1942.

Among the ships which Hank helped screen in the 116 unit task force were battle veterans such as heavy cruiser Indianapolis, aircraft carriers Bunker Hill, Hornet, Wasp, Lexington, Essex, Yorktown, Enterprise, and Saratoga, and battleships Indiana, Missouri, South Dakota, and Washington. Deploying to the Iwo Jima area the afternoon of 18 February, Hank remained there to provide support for the invasion which began the following day, and she operated off the bitterly contested island until returning to Ulithi on 4 March.

As the Pacific war moved into its climactic phases, Hank steamed from Ulithi on 14 March 1945, with Task Force 58 for further strikes against the Japanese home islands. Closing to within 75 miles (121 km) of their targets, the carriers launched massive strikes against airfields on Kyushu and ships in the Inland Sea 18–19 March. Although under heavy air opposition from time to time, the carrier planes claimed a total of 528 Japanese aircraft destroyed. After participating in the bombardment of enemy shore positions—including radio facilities, a weather station, and an airfield on Minami Daito Shima on 27–28 March, Hank headed for Okinawa. Her task force furnished support for landings made on that heavily fortified island on 1 April, and Hank spent a busy week screening the carriers and stopping kamikazes with highly effective antiaircraft fire. The destroyer then reported to a lonely radar picket station, where on the afternoon of 11 April she narrowly averted disaster by her effective gunfire. As a kamikaze came in low off the port bow, heading directly for the bridge, Hank's accurate antiaircraft fire deflected it slightly, but the Zero came in close enough to kill three sailors before crashing into the sea and exploding close aboard.

After repairs at Ulithi, Hank again joined Task Force 58 on 1 May to resume screening and radar picket duties off Okinawa. June was spent at San Pedro Bay, Philippines, undergoing replenishment and training, and on 1 July the carriers redesignated Task Force 38 and operating under Vice Admiral McCain in Admiral Halsey's 3rd Fleet sortied to launch further strikes against the home islands. Hank spent most of this period on hazardous and lonely radar picket duty, steaming 50 miles (80 km) from the main body of ships to provide early warning of enemy air attacks.

On the night of 18 July, Hank joined Destroyer Squadron 62 and Cruiser Division 18 for an antishipping sweep across the entrance to Tokyo Bay. At 22:30, she and the destroyer USS Wallace L. Lind (DD-703) mistakenly opened gunfire on the U.S. Navy submarine USS Gabilan (SS-252) at a range of 12,800 yards (12,000 m) while Gabilan was on the surface in the Pacific Ocean off the Bōsō Peninsula, Honshu, Japan, at 35°05′N 140°50′E. Gabilan had difficulty diving in heavy seas and broached, and the destroyers' gunfire straddled her an estimated ten times before she finally submerged and broke contact.

As Hank patrolled her radar picket station on 9 August 1945, she and USS Borie (DD-704) found themselves in the midst of five kamikazes. One of the aircraft came so close to Hank that it drenched both ship and personnel forward with gasoline before the veteran ships destroyed it and the other four attackers. Borie had been hit in the after bridge structure and suffered 48 dead and 66 wounded, while Hank had to report one man missing in action and five wounded.

Hostilities ceased on 15 August 1945, and Hank steamed into Tokyo Bay 10 September to participate in the occupation. She continued operations around Japan and Pearl Harbor through 30 December, when she sailed for Charleston, S.C., via Eniwetok, Pearl Harbor, San Diego, and the Panama Canal.

=== Korean War ===
The veteran ship operated primarily out of New Orleans for reserve training cruises and good will visits to Caribbean and Central American ports until sailing on 6 September 1949 for the Mediterranean. During her 5 months with the 6th Fleet, Hank participated in amphibious operations and visited Gibraltar, Malta, France, Sicily, Italy, and Algeria. Returning to Norfolk on 26 January 1950, Hank engaged in training operations and a cruise to the Caribbean until sailing for the Far East and the Korean War on 6 September. She arrived Yokosuka, Japan, 1 month later and joined the United Nations Blockade and Escort Force off the Korean coast. Her movements centered mainly around Wonsan Harbor, then under siege, with frequent interruptions for blockade patrol and bombardment missions. Hank supported the evacuation of Wonsan in early December and then moved up to Hungnam to help provide the curtain of fire which covered the evacuation of Allied troops. In January and February 1951, Hank supported the 8th Army as it moved to recapture and consolidate Seoul and Inchon. Screening, blockade patrol, and shore bombardment constituted the destroyer's duties along the Korean coast until she sailed for the United States, reaching Norfolk on 9 June via San Diego, the Panama Canal, and Guantanamo.

=== Post-war ===
After a yard overhaul at Norfolk, Hank resumed the peacetime training operations, Caribbean exercises, and annual deployments to the Mediterranean that kept the fleet ready to serve America well at any moment on the seas. In the fall of 1956, in the Suez Crisis, as warfare flared over the nationalization of the Suez Canal, Hank was there.

In 1960, the destroyer with the Navy began to reach into space. She participated in training for Project Mercury, America's first man-in-space effort, off the Virginia capes, and she was designated one of the recovery ships when Astronaut Lieutenant Commander Scott Carpenter made his orbital flight 24 May 1962. Hank operated with Independence on blockade and surveillance duty during the October 1962 Cuban Missile Crisis, remaining in the tension-filled Caribbean for nearly a month. She was designated a Naval Reserve Training Ship in October 1963 and proceeded to her new home port, Philadelphia. After undergoing repairs at Sun Shipbuilding & Drydock Co., Chester Pennsylvania, in 1964 Hank began reserve training cruises along the East Coast from Fort. Lauderdale, Florida, to Halifax, Nova Scotia, continuing into 1972.

=== Argentine naval service ===
Hank was decommissioned and sold to Argentina on 1 July 1972, and renamed ARA Seguí (D-25). She participated in the Falklands War, taking part in the initial invasion of the Falklands in April 1982. Later, her Exocet missiles were removed, and remounted on an improvised coastal launch platform, from which they were used to hit HMS Glamorgan off Stanley at 06:37 on Saturday 12 June 1982. Segui was scrapped in 1983.

== Awards ==
Hank received four battle stars for World War II, and four for Korean service.

== Reunions ==
Men who served on the USS Hank hold a reunion in cities across the United States each year. Often spouses and families join them. Cities where reunions have been held include Buffalo, New York; Charleston, South Carolina; Minneapolis–St. Paul, Minnesota, and St. Louis, Missouri.

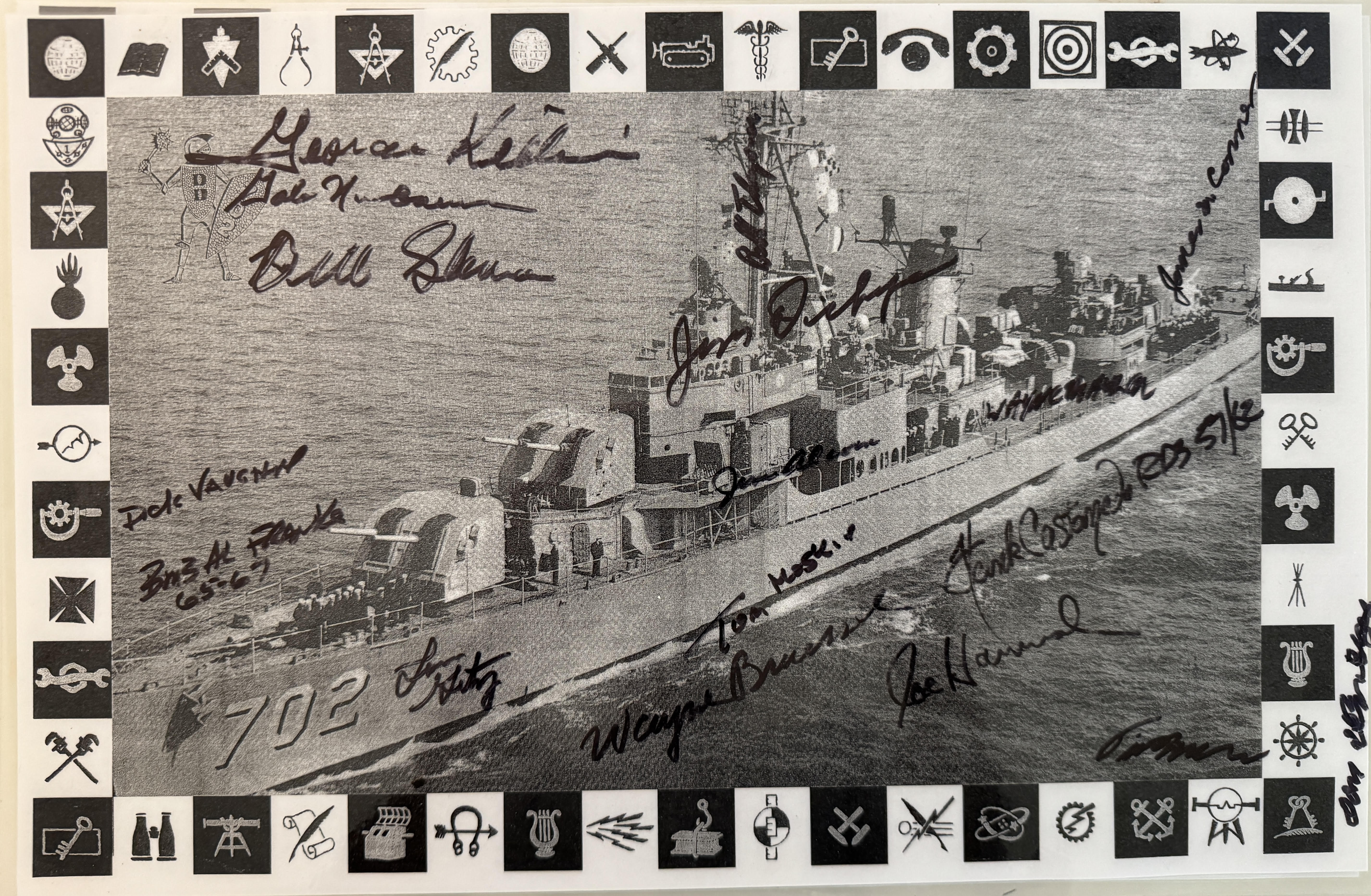

The last reunion was held in Roanoke, VA in 2023 with only a few sailors in attendance. FT3 Jim Dickmeyer attended the last reunion and stated that "most of the guys were too old and it was too much trouble for anyone to meet anymore".

He was station on the USS Hank for 3 years and was deployed to the Mediterranean and Persian Gulf around 1957.

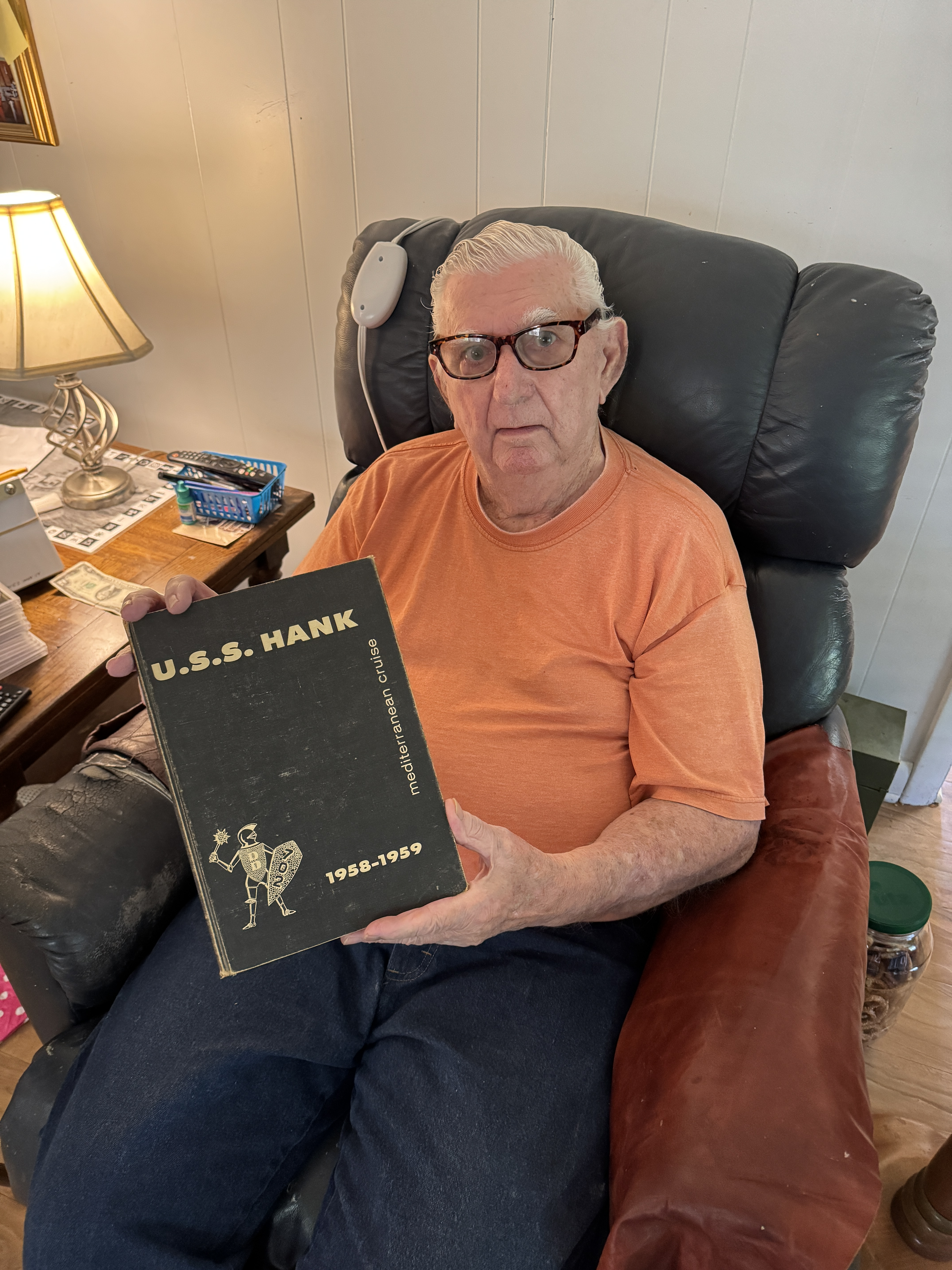
