= Glam God with Vivica A. Fox =

2008 VH1 television show

- Genre: Reality
- Created by: Cris Abrego
- Presented by: Vivica A. Fox
- Starring: Tigerlily Hill; Indashio
- No. of seasons: 1
- No. of episodes: 8

Production
- Executive producers: Cris Abrego; Ben Samek; Vivica A. Fox; Lita Richardson
- Running time: 44 minutes
- Production company: 51 Minds Entertainment

Original release
- Network: VH1
- Release: August 21 – October 16, 2008

Glam God with Vivica A. Fox is an American reality television show hosted by Vivica A. Fox. The series aired on VH1 from August 21, 2008, to October 16, 2008.

== Overview ==
In the series, twelve contestants compete to become the next "Glam God". A Glam God is a stylist who gets their clients on the best dressed. Cris Abrego, the show's executive producer, conceived of the show.

The winner of Glam God Season 1 was Indashio.

== The Glam Squad ==
- Vivica A. Fox - Red Carpet Diva
- Melanie Bromley "British Invasion" - US Magazine Editor
- Phillip Bloch - Glam God

== Contestants ==
Name	Eliminated
Aaron	Episode 1
Coxy	Episode 1
Genelle	Episode 2
Matt	Episode 3
Joachim	Episode 4
Bo	Episode 5
Chris	Episode 5
Jess	Episode 6
Handry	Episode 7
Preston	Episode 8
Tigerlily Hill	Episode 8
Indashio	Winner

== Elimination Progress ==
Stylist	1	2	3	4	5	6	7	8	
Indashio	WIN	LOW	IN	LOW	LOW	WIN	LOW	LOW	WINNER
Tigerlily	WIN	HIGH	LOW	WIN	WIN*	HIGH	HIGH	HIGH	RUNNER-UP
Preston	HIGH	WIN	WIN	IN	LOW	IN	WIN	OUT	
Handry	HIGH	WIN	IN	LOW	LOW	IN	OUT		
Jess	LOW	IN	WIN	HIGH	WIN*	OUT			
Bo	LOW	LOW	LOW	LOW	OUT				
Chris	LOW	HIGH	WIN	WIN	OUT				
Joachim	HIGH	IN	IN	OUT					
Matt	HIGH	LOW	OUT						
Genelle	WIN	OUT							
Aaron	OUT								
Coxy	OUT								

HIGH The stylist was selected as one of the top entries in the Elimination Challenge, but did not win.
LOW The stylist was selected on Challenge and was out of the competition.
IN This stylist was in next round
WIN
OUT
HIGH
RUNNER-UP
WINNER

^{*} - This victory was Preston and Tigerlily and Team Jess and Handry.

== Episode summary ==
=== Episode 1: "Who Wore It Best" ===
The groups were as follows:

- Jess, Aaron, Bo
- Tigerlily, Indashio, Genelle
- Chris, Coxy, Handry
- Joachim, Matt, Preston

- Winners: Tigerlily, Indashio, Genelle
- Eliminated: Coxy, Aaron

=== Episode 2: "What they Thinking?" ===
The hot trend challenge was to style an outfit for actress Aimee Garcia. The winning group would have their design worn by Garcia at a red carpet event.

- Preston, Handry
- Joachim, Jess
- Matt, Indashio
- Tigerlily, Christopher
- Genelle, Bo

- Winners: Preston, Handry
- Eliminated: Genelle

- Joachim, Indashio, Handry
- Jess, Chris, Preston
- Matt, Tigerlily, Bo

- Winners: Jess, Chris, Preston
- Eliminated: Matt
- Guest Judge: A Cursive Memory

=== Episode 4: "Low Life in High Heels" ===
The challenge started with the teams designing a look for a starlet to wear. They had to salvage her look after she exits a nightclub with the paparazzi watching her every move. Joachim's drinking embarrasses the team.

- Eliminated: Joachim

=== Episode 5: "Growing Pains" ===
The stylists got a wake up call that is a blast from the past. They must take a signature item from the past and revolutionize it to current style.

== Reception ==
Kari Croop of Common Sense Media called the television series "a watchable guilty pleasure that will likely stay on the TV schedule thanks to a roster of contestants who are both entertaining and talented".
