= Hands (EP) =

Hands EP

EP by Emanuel and the Fear
- Released: June 10, 2011
- Genre: Symphonic rock
- Label: EAT Fear, Haldern Pop
- Producer: Emanuel Ayvas, Nic Cowles, Jeff Gretz

Emanuel and the Fear chronology
| Listen (2010) | Hands EP (2011) | The Janus Mirror (2012) |

Hands is the second EP from Brooklyn-based symphonic rock band Emanuel and the Fear and was released via EAT Fear Records in June 2011 following the band's first full-length release, Listen.

== Reception ==
The 405 issued a positive review of the band's second EP, declaring "Hands is an EP which demonstrates musicianship at its best...a wonderful mixture of influences, added to its melodies and textures, all add together to create a true good feeling within your heart. Fans of Ben Folds and Nils Lofgren especially should like and admire this record but it has the accessibility for just about anyone to jump in and enjoy – excuse the pun – over and over again." Following the release of the EP, the band toured throughout the UK, including a stop in England to play the End of the Road Festival, where they shared a stage with Joanna Newsom, Lykke Li, Best Coast and Beirut.

== Track listing ==
1. "Over and Over" 5:19
2. "Vampires" 3:51
3. "Purple Sunless Sky" 3:51
4. "Meadowlands" 5:27
5. "Song for the Rain" 5:55
