= The Janus Mirror =

Studio album by Emanuel and the Fear
- Released: September 28, 2012
- Genre: Symphonic rock
- Labels: Haldern Pop, Eat Fear, Moorworks
- Producers: Emanuel Ayvas, Nic Cowles, Jeff Gretz

Emanuel and the Fear chronology
Hands (2009)	The Janus Mirror (2012)	Primitive Smile (2016)

The Janus Mirror is the second full-length album from Brooklyn-based symphonic rock band Emanuel and the Fear and was released via Haldern Pop in September 2012.

== Inspiration ==
The band has stated the record is about change. "It deals with the over-filled human experience in today's silicone world… [it's] our eyes, it is the point between the world outside and the world in our minds," says lead singer Emanuel Ayvas, who has also said he was inspired by a "vision of a two-headed monster."

== Track listing ==
1. "The Janus Mirror" 4:15
2. "Samuel" 5:05
3. "Grey Eyes" 3:51
4. "Wooble" 7:01
5. "Foothills of a Fire" 6:10
6. "Black Eyes" 4:06
7. "My Oh My" 5:40
8. "All We All" 5:08
9. "Vampires" (live) - Japanese Edition bonus track
10. "Ariel and the River" (live) - Japanese Edition bonus track
