= Emanuel and the Fear (EP) =

2009 self-titled EP

Emanuel and the Fear EP

EP by Emanuel and the Fear
- Released: February 17, 2009
- Genre: Symphonic rock
- Label: Paper Garden
- Producers: Jamin Gilbert for Ishlab Music; Emanuel Ayvas

Emanuel and the Fear chronology
Emanuel and the Fear EP (2009)	Listen (2010)

Emanuel and the Fear is the first EP from Brooklyn-based symphonic rock band Emanuel and the Fear and was released via Paper Garden Records in February 2009.

== Reception ==
Following their first release, the band was included in The L Magazine's list of "8 NYC Bands You Need to Hear" where they described the EP by saying: "The songs are based in the pop tradition, with melody proudly taking center stage, but the tidy and immaculately composed classical arrangements and the subtle electronic flourishes give the whole thing a much grander feel that immediately drives home the point that these folks can’t be contained by small stages for very long, neither literally nor figuratively."

The EP was rated positively in The Guardian's new band of the week series. Obscure Sound and Sputnik Music also gave positive reviews.

== In popular media ==
The song Comfortable Prison was used in an episode of the MTV reality show 16 & Pregnant.

The song, "The Rain Becomes the Clouds", was featured in the episode "Movie Night" of the ABC Family show Huge.

== Track listing ==
1. "The Rain Becomes the Clouds" 03:40
2. "Comfortable Prison" 04:12
3. "Jimme's Song" 07:58
4. "We're All Alright Tonight" 04:23
5. "Two" 04:27

== Personnel ==
- Emanuel Ayvas - synth, guitar, piano, vocals
- Tom Swafford - violin
- Brian Sanders - cello
- Jeff Gretz - drums
- Dallin Applebaum - vocals, organ, synth
- Liz Hanley - vocals
- Colin Dean - bass
- Nic Cowles - flute
- Chris Colletti - trumpet
- David Nelson - trombone
- Dan Tirer - guitar
- Deantoni Parks - drums
- Jamin Gilbert - turntables, programming
