= Scarlett la Queen =

Russian singer (born 1979)

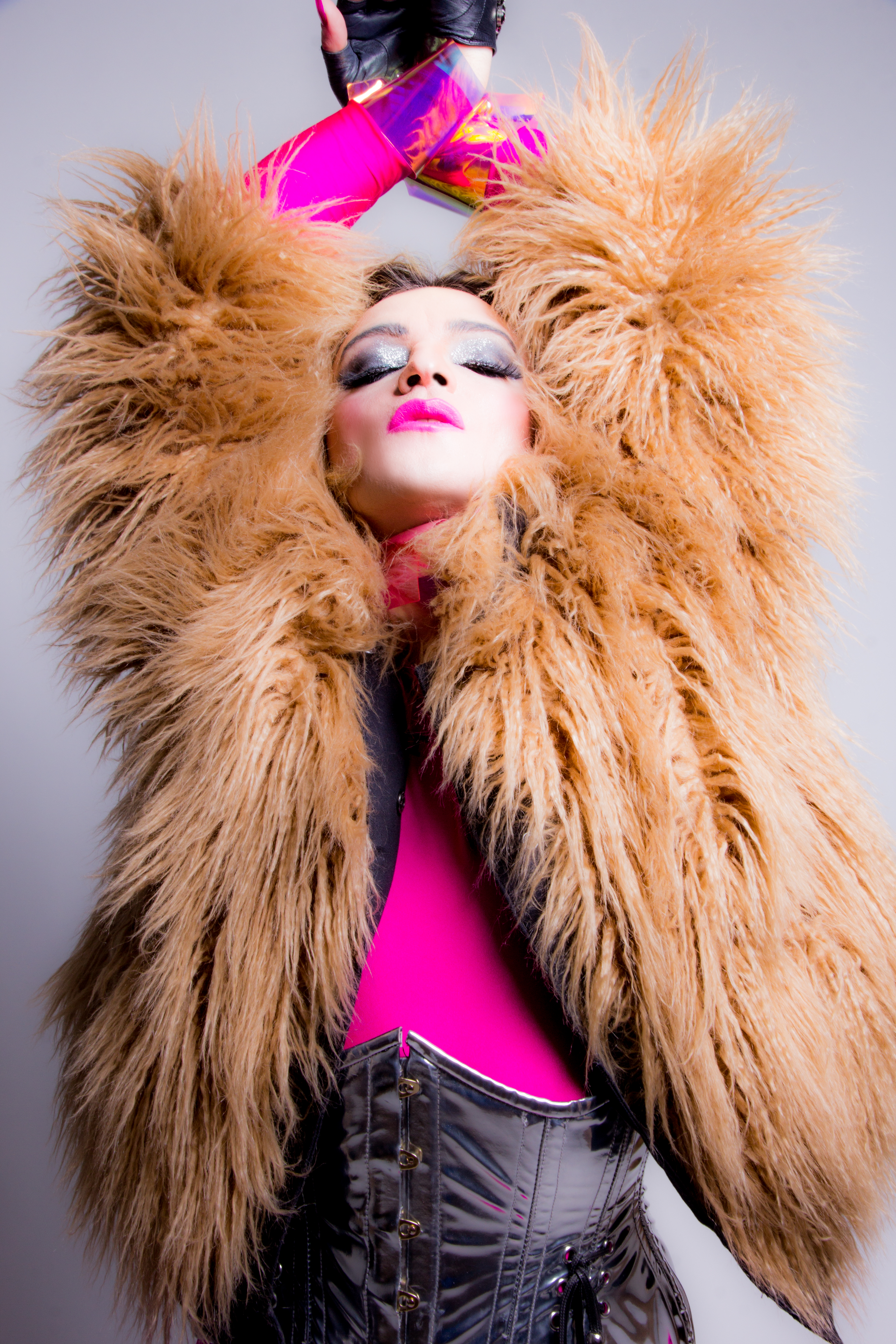

Background information
- Born: January 15, 1979 (age 47); Nalchik, Kabardino-Balkaria, USSR
- Occupation: Singer

Scarlett la Queen also known as Oscar (born 15 January 1979, Nalchik, Kabardino-Balkaria, Russia) is a Russian-American singer and actress.

== Early life ==
Scarlett was assigned male at birth and named Shamil Vladimirovich Malkanduev. She was born in a military family in Nalchik (Republic of Kabardino-Balkaria).

== Career ==
At the festival in Nalchik, she met Artur Atsalamov, the founder of the music band «Мёртвые Дельфины» (Dead Dolphins), who later wrote several songs for her, including her hits «Бег по острию ножа» (The Run on the Edge of a Knife), «Паноптикум» (Panopticon) and «Мажь вазелином» (Use Vaseline).

For more than seven weeks her music video for the song «Между мной и тобой» (Between You and Me) was on the first place in MTV's chart "TOP 20". The debut album «Бег по острию ножа» (The run on the edge of a knife), released in August 2000, sold half a million copies. On May 25, 2001, she received the Ovation Award in the Best Male Performer nomination.

=== Work with Sergey Izotov ===
In Moscow she performed in night clubs under pseudonym Oscar. Where then she met producer Sergey Izotov, in cooperation with whom she began her career as a singer. The peak of her popularity feld on 2000–2003 years. The producer created a legend for Oscar, according to which Oscar used to be trapped under the rubble, and as a result spent several years in a coma and then began singing.

In 2003, she had a conflict with Izotov and lost the rights for the stage name Oscar and for some of the songs. According to some reports, the reason for this was the song ″Не надо (Джихад)″ (Don't (Jihad)) in which Oscar spoke out against the Second Chechen War. Her music video for this song was composed of the military chronicle of the times of the Second Chechen War and Moscow theater hostage crisis.

=== United States ===
In 2003 she moved to New York, where she was a film student. Living in the USA, she organized the musical project "The Oskar & Psycholovers", recorded and co-produced the full-length English-language album "Fantasies of a Rockstar", consequently appearing on several popular TV shows (America's Got Talent, Fearless Music) and embarking on a mini-tour consisting of international as well as domestic US concert dates. Following the release of album a music-video for the song "Lucky Number" was filmed and broadcast via US music channels.

=== Return to Russia ===
At the end of 2008 she returned to Russia. In 2010, while performing for Russian music-award 'Night Life Awards 2010', she presented the new Russian-language single "Gagarin", created in-collaboration with Andrey Ivanov (member of the Triplex music project).

== Discography ==
Year	Original title	Title in English	Stage name
2000	Бег по острию ножа	The run on the edge of a knife	Oscar
2001	Оскар II	Oscar II	Oscar
2001	Последний. Альбом	The last. Album	Oscar
2005	О’скар убит — Шамиль задержан (Анализируй это!)	Oscar is killed — Shamil is detained (Analyze this!)	Shamil
2005	Make love to America (Talking To God)	Make love to America (Talking To God)	The Oskar & Psycholovers
2009	Fantasies of a Rockstar	Fantasies of a Rockstar	The Oskar & Psycholovers
2020	Полюби	Love	Scarlett la Queen

== Awards ==
- 2001, Golden Gramophone Award. She was nominated (under her stage name "Oscar"), but did not take part in the awards ceremony due to the prohibition of her producer.

== Personal life ==
In 2003, in an interview for Argumenty i Fakty, she referred to herself as bisexual.

On 11 June 2013 in Moscow, she was beaten and robbed. She started the day by jogging in Catherine Park. At 11:50 AM she went down to the underpass, then she was attacked by two men. According to Scarlett, one of the strangers punched her into the face causing her to lose consciousness (later it was discovered her jaw had been fractured). And when she woke up, she realized that her phone and iPad were missing. Police officers detained two attackers; they were 21-year-old and 22-year-old Kyrgyzstani nationals whose goal was to earn money.

On 4 July 2013, on the talk show Let Them Talk, she stated that she is a Muslim.

In January 2020 she came out as a transgender woman and revealed her name is Scarlett la Queen. Several media called her the first Russian transgender singer. She chose the name Scarlett being inspired by Scarlett O'Hara, the main character of the novel Gone with the Wind.

Scarlett was disowned by her parents following her 'coming out' as a trans woman.
