= Out for Blood =

Out for Blood may refer to:

- Out for Blood (Lita Ford album), 1983
- Out for Blood (Sadus album), 2006
- Out for Blood (Unit:187 album), 2010
- Out for Blood (Farewell Flight album), 2011
- "Out for Blood", a song by GG Allin from his 1984 album Eat My Fuc
- "Out for Blood", a song by Pantera from their 1984 album Projects in the Jungle
- "Out for Blood", a song by Agnostic Front from their 1986 album Cause for Alarm
- "Out for Blood", a song by The Crown from their 2002 album Crowned in Terror
- "Out for Blood", a song by Sum 41 from their 2019 album Order in Decline
- The Inventor: Out for Blood in Silicon Valley, a 2019 HBO documentary about fraud at the blood testing company Theranos
