= Phillip Bloch =

American celebrity stylist, designer, and television personality

- Born: 1960–1961; Long Island, New York
- Education: Fashion Institute of Technology
- Occupations: Stylist, writer, designer, actor and television personality
- Years active: 1980–present
- Television: Entertainment Tonight, America's Next Top Model, Glam God with Vivica A. Fox, Cause Celeb With Phillip Bloch
- Website: phillipbloch.com

Phillip Bloch is an American celebrity stylist, designer, and television personality. He has styled historic cover photos including River Phoenix, which would be Phoenix's last photo shoot and the photo would be used on the cover of several magazines, and Michael Jackson for Ebony and Jet magazine. Bloch also styled the very first issue of VIBE magazine, and was featured in the film Return to Babylon and co-starred on the VH1 reality series Glam God with Vivica A. Fox.

Bloch has been a stylist to celebrities such as Halle Berry, Lindsay Lohan, Salma Hayek, John Travolta, Will Smith, Jada Pinkett Smith, Sandra Bullock, Nicole Kidman, Jennifer Lopez, and Melania Trump. Bloch has acted in 17 films, produced two films, and is a regular guest correspondent for E!, CNN, Entertainment Tonight, Access Hollywood, HLN and ABC. Bloch is also an active member of the Creative Coalition.

== Career ==
Bloch began his fashion career in the 1980s as a model working with designers such as Jean Paul Gaultier, Yves Saint Laurent and Rei Kawakubo as well as Italian Vogue, Jordache Jeans, Dior, Vogue Homme, and Per Lui Amica. In 1981, he was chosen for the Jordache Jeans campaign which funded his way to London, where he was selected for the cover of teen magazine Oh Boy, which would be his first. After one year of modeling, Bloch returned to the US and worked at Studio 54.

Bloch worked in Spain with photographer Javier Vallhonrat on a campaign for Wrangler and editorial in Vogue Espana. He was discovered and recruited to work in Japan where he met designer Jean Paul Gaultier. Bloch walked in Gaultier's show as well as several other designers in Paris. He also worked in Italy with stylist Sciascia Gambaccini for Per Lui.

Bloch lived and worked in Europe for almost a decade where he walked the runways designers, Jean Paul Gaultier, John Galliano, Yves Saint Laurent, Romeo Gigli, Comme des Garçons, Jean-Charles de Castelbajac, and Gianni Versace. He was also featured in editorials in L’Uomo Vogue, The Face, I-D, Amica and Vogue Homme, amongst other top European titles.

After eight years in modeling, Bloch looked to transition from modeling and was encouraged by editors to become a stylist. By the late 1980s, Bloch was working as a PR representative for European design houses, including Romeo Gigli and Costume National. He began designing and created Les Enfants du Paradis, a Milan-based knitwear line, with his partner Stefano Di Sabatino.

=== Stylist ===
In the 1990s, Bloch moved to Los Angeles where he became a fashion stylist at the Cloutier Agency. In 1993, his first job at the agency was to dress the actor River Phoenix for the cover of Detour, which would be Phoenix's last photo shoot and the photo would be used on the cover of several magazines. In 1994, Bloch dressed his first major female star, Faye Dunaway, for her appearance as host of 1994 edition of The Golden Globes. They would continue to work together for several years. Bloch became a known celebrity stylist with clients such as Michael Jackson whose Ebony and Jet magazine covers that Bloch styled would become historic. In 1997, Bloch created dressed an unprecedented 12 celebrities for the Oscars, including Sandra Bullock, Will Smith, Jada Pinkett Smith, Jennifer Lopez and Salma Hayek. Bloch also styled Michael Jackson for his last covers for Ebony and Jet magazine in 2007. In 2015, Bloch became creative style director for NFL Women's Apparel for their first-ever Hall of Fashion event.

=== Designer ===
Bloch's design career began in the 1980s when he created Les Enfants du Paradis, a Milan-based knitwear line composed of women's cashmere separates, with his partner Stefano Di Sabatino. The business closed as a result of operating costs outweighing profit. In 2000, Bloch launched a line of costume jewelry with the shopping channel QVC. In 2004, Bloch designed a new line of crystal jewelry for Baccarat. The eight-piece crystal collection included a necklace and earrings designed with Hollywood starlets as an inspiration and was taken to the Oscars. In 2008, Bloch debuted a holiday cashmere collection for the label, Phillip Bloch for Emma & Posh at Toronto Fashion Week. In the same year, he also debuted a men's collection for Unruly Heir. In 2009, Bloch partnered with Hush Puppies as a guest designer for men's shoes. In 2009, Bloch partnered with Hush Puppies as a guest designer for men's shoes. He also designed the Phillip Bloch for Hush Puppies eyewear collection, which was released by the Kenmark Group.

== Television and film ==
=== Television ===
Bloch has been featured as a celebrity fashion stylist on The Tyra Banks Show as well as America's Next Top Model, Canada's Next Top Model, and Britain's Next Top Model. Additionally, Bloch has made television appearances on Inside Edition, The Wendy Williams Show, Dr. Phil, Good Morning America and The View.

In 1998, Bloch was invited by CNN to host its pre-show to the 1998 Academy Awards. He also appeared in the AMC original documentary The Hollywood Fashion Machine. Additionally, Bloch had regular appearances on MTV, VH1 and the E! network and he became a featured comedian on VH1's comedic pop-culture countdown shows. Bloch was later the designated style expert on MTV’s House of Style and was featured in his own episode of Ashton Kutcher's Punk'd.

In 2002, Bloch covered the Cannes Film Festival for ABC News and launched a partnership with eBay in which he was named Fashion Editor. In 2008, Bloch co-starred on the VH1 reality series Glam God with Vivica A. Fox. Bloch judged a group of stylists as they competed for the grand prize of $100,000. In 2011, he joined ABC News as a broadcast correspondent with projects such as serving as third anchor on the Royal Wedding of the Duke and Duchess of Cambridge and eventually was granted his own television series. Bloch produced Cause Celeb With Phillip Bloch, which was a globally aired series of interviews with celebrities discussing their philanthropic involvement. Phillip Bloch Inc. produced 28 interviews with celebrities including Ivanka Trump, Steve Harvey, Chaka Khan, Forest Whitaker, Kristen Bell, Wendy Williams and Carmelo Anthony bringing attention to their causes.

=== Film ===
Bloch has acted in 17 films and produced two films. His work includes Michael Jackson: The Last Photo Shoots, The Eyes of Tammy Faye, The Intern, and The Unseen, which all premiered at the Sundance Film Festival. He appeared in Jay Z's Death of a Dynasty in 2003, which premiered at the Tribeca Film Festival. In 2004, Bloch had his first leading film role as a blind character named Sammy in the feature film The Unseen, which starred Judah Friedlander, Steve Harris and Gospel legend Shirley Caesar. Bloch's next lead role was in the black and white silent film Return to Babylon, which he co-produced and played the character Ramon Novarro. Return to Babylon was an official selection at the Glendale International Film Festival in 2015.

In 2010, Bloch made an appearance in the Oliver Stone directed Wall Street: Money Never Sleeps, which starred Michael Douglas, Shia LaBeouf, and Carey Mulligan. Bloch was also featured in the independent fashion documentary, Ultrasuede: In Search of Halston. In 2015, Bloch was featured in Michael Jackson: The Last Photo Shoots, a behind-the-scenes documentary on Michael Jackson.

In 2026, a documentary titled Phillip Bloch AF: Always Fashionable entered early production, focusing on the life and career of Bloch. Directed by Debra A. Wilson-Cary and produced by HenDar Media, the film will feature archival footage, behind-the-scenes material, and interviews with figures from the fashion and entertainment industries.

== Bibliography ==
- Bloch, P., & Nelson, M. (1998). Elements of Style: From the Portfolio of Hollywood's Premier Stylist. New York, New York: Warner Books, Inc.
- Bloch, P. (2010). The Shopping Diet: Spend Less and Get More. New York, New York: Gallery Books.
- Reagan Jr, R. (2004). If You Had Five Minutes with the President. New York, New York: HarperCollins.
- Mell, E. (2011). New York Fashion Week the Designers, the Models, the Fashions of the Bryant Park Era. New York: Running Press.
- Bronk, R. (Ed.). (2011). Art & Soul: Stars Unite to Celebrate and Support the Arts. Filipacchi Publishing.

== Filmography ==
=== Film ===
| Year | Title | Notes |
|---|---|---|
| 2000 | Dressing for the Oscars | (TV movie documentary) |
| 2000 | The Intern | |
| 2000 | The Eyes of Tammy Faye | |
| 2003 | Death of a Dynasty | |
| 2005 | The Unseen | Actor and producer |
| 2005 | Love and Suicide | |
| 2006 | Delirious | |
| 2006 | Dirty Laundry | |
| 2007 | Victoriana | |
| 2008 | Gospel Hill | |
| 2012 | The Tents | (documentary) |
| 2013 | Return to Babylon | Actor and co-producer |
| 2015 | Michael Jackson: The Last Photo Shoots | (documentary; post-production) |
| 2015 | Booted | |
| 2015 | Stealing Chanel | |

=== Television ===
| Year | Title | Notes |
|---|---|---|
| 2002 | 30th International Emmy Awards | (TV special) |
| 2003 | Punk'd | (TV series) |
| 2004 | 101 Most Sensational Crimes of Fashion | (TV movie) |
| 2004 | 50 Most Awesomely Bad Songs... Ever | (TV movie documentary) |
| 2004 | E! True Hollywood Story | (TV series documentary) |
| 2004 | 20 Most Awesomely Bad Songs of 2004 | (TV special documentary) |
| 2004 | 40 Most Awesomely Bad Dirrty Songs... Ever | (TV special documentary) |
| 2005 | Entourage | (TV series) |
| 2005 | 101 Even Bigger Celebrity Oops | (TV movie documentary) |
| 2005 | Merry F#%$in' Christmas | (TV movie) |
| 2005 | Great Things About the Holidays | (TV movie) |
| 2005–2010 | Fashion News Live | (TV series) |
| 2006 | Style Me | (TV series) |
| 2006 | ABC World News Tonight with David Muir | (TV series) |
| 2007 | The Most Annoying Pop Songs.... We Hate to Love | (TV series documentary) |
| 2007 | 40 Greatest Reality TV Moments 2 | (TV movie documentary) |
| 2007 | Five News | (TV series) |
| 2008 | Ebony Fashion Fair: 50 Years of Style | (TV movie) |
| 2008 | Dr. Phil | (TV series) |
| 2008 | Starz Inside: Fashion in Film | (TV movie documentary) |
| 2008 | Glam God with Vivica A. Fox | (TV series) |
| 2010 | Ultrasuede: In Search of Halston | (documentary) |
| 2011 | Academy Awards: Iconic Stars, Legendary Fashions | (TV series and movie documentary) |
| 2013 | A Healthy You & Carol Alt | (TV series) |
| 2015 | Entertainment Tonight | (TV series) |
