= Snow Milk =

American streetwear brand

- Type: Private
- Industry: Fashion
- Founded: 2022
- Founder: Doobie Duke Sims
- Products: Streetwear
- Website: www.realsnowmilk.com

Snow Milk is an American streetwear brand based in Brooklyn, New York. Founded by artist and musician Doobie Duke Sims, the company produces new and upcycled streetwear, including individually produced and limited-run clothing.

== History ==
Snow Milk was founded in 2022 in Brooklyn, New York City by Doobie Duke Sims, a member of the Brooklyn rock and hip hop band Shinobi Ninja. The brand developed from Sims' work in screen printing and initially sold small collections of individually designed garments around New York City.

In May 2023, CNBC reported that the company had grown from a T-shirt business into a six-figure streetwear operation. In 2024, Snow Milk expanded into Japan and is sold through the Tokyo retailer Absolute Blue Select.

== Design and production ==
Snow Milk produces new and upcycled clothing using screen printing and other garment-finishing techniques. The brand is known for varying the combination, graphics, placement and colors between garments rather than producing identical versions of each design.

== Notable wearers and media appearances ==
Snow Milk clothing has been worn by figures in entertainment, music and sports. In 2023, tennis player Novak Djokovic wore a custom Snow Milk "Mamba Forever" shirt honoring Kobe Bryant following his victory at the 2023 US Open, where he won his 24th Grand Slam singles title. The shirt was individually numbered as part of Snow Milk's numbered-garment practice.

In 2026, actor and performer Ben Vereen became a brand ambassador for Snow Milk.
