= Pic.Nic festival =

Pic.Nic is a music festival held annually at the Israel Trade Fairs & Convention Center in Tel Aviv, Israel. The festival is produced by Shuki Weiss Promotion & Production Ltd. and holds as the biggest summer festival in Tel Aviv. Pic.Nic's slogan "A basket Of Music" refers to the variety of music styles that are presented in the festival's lineup, from pop to rock to electronic themes.

== 2010 Lineup ==
The first ever Pic.Nic festival was scheduled for the month of June and was spread over two days. The first at June 5, with Placebo as headliners. And the second at June 9, with Pixies as headliners of the evening.

The first day lineup:

Placebo

Klaxons

Gorillaz Sound System

Hank & Cupcakes

The second day lineup:

Pixies

Editors

Carusella

== 2011 Lineup ==
Pic.Nic 2011 was announced in early April, 2011. This year the festival will set along three days, with headliners Moby, Duran Duran and Jane's Addiction. Due to Duran Duran lead singer Simon Le Bon illness the band had to postpone their concert to 2012, leaving the festival with only 2 days.

Day 1 lineup:

Moby

Kruder & Dorfmeister

Kaki King

Cohen@Mushon

Day 2 lineup:

Jane's Addiction

Blonde Redhead

Elisha Banai

== Cancellations ==
On June 4, 2010, A day before the opening of the festival, Klaxons and Gorillaz Sound system canceled their shows at the festival in the wake of the flotilla incident with the IDF which occurred the week before. Nevertheless, Placebo still went ahead with their concert and the band J. Viewz and local rock musician Rami Fortis were called to replace them. Two days later, Pixies canceled their planned concert in the festival. However, the festival still went ahead with Editors replacing Pixies as the headliners.
