= Emanuel and the Fear =

- Origin: Brooklyn, New York
- Genres: Symphonic rock, indie rock
- Years active: 2008–present
- Labels: Paper Garden, Haldern Pop, Eat Fear
- Members: Emanuel Ayvas; Jeff Gretz; Gil Goldin; Nic Cowles; Liz Hanley; Sarah Haines; Ben Backus
- Website: emanuelandthefear.com

Emanuel and the Fear is an American symphonic rock band founded in Brooklyn in 2008 by frontman Emanuel Ayvas.

== History ==
In 2009, the band released their first self-titled EP on Paper Garden Records. The 5-track EP was executive produced by Jamin Gilbert (for Ishlab Music) and featured the band's first hit 'Jimme's Song.' The band toured extensively to promote the record, playing large shows and festivals, including CMJ and the Northside Festival in New York, and Pop Montreal in Canada.

In 2010, they released their first full-length record, Listen, consisting of nineteen tracks, which includes some short tracks of random sounds and background noises. The record was produced and edited by Jamin Gilbert (for Ishlab Music) and Emanuel Ayvas. Patrick Dillett, who previously worked with David Byrne, They Might Be Giants and Mary J. Blige, mixed the record. The band's first full-length release received immediate acclaim, including favorable write-ups on Flavorpill, NME, Fearless Music, RCRD LBL, and Deli Magazine. The band was also included in The L Magazine's list of '8 NYC Bands You Need to Hear' To celebrate the release of their first record, the band played a sold-out show at Gramercy Theatre in New York City, accompanied by a 30-piece orchestra led by frontman Emanuel Ayvas. Following the success of the album release, the band toured throughout the US and Europe, including several sold-out shows in their hometown of New York.

After continued touring to support their first release, the band released Hands, in Summer 2011. The 5-track EP was released by Eat Fear Records (US) and Haldern Pop (Europe). The EP featured stand-out track 'Over and Over,' described as "a flurry of strings and syncopation [that] flourish into a melting pot of harmonica, guitar, and horns while Ayvas' cool voice rattles off prophetic word." The 405 issued a positive review of the band's second EP, declaring Hands is an EP which demonstrates musicianship at its best...a wonderful mixture of influences, added to its melodies and textures all add together to create a true good feeling within your heart. Fans of Ben Folds and Nils Lofgren especially should like and admire this record but it has the accessibility for just about anyone to jump in and enjoy – excuse the pun - over and over again." In September 2011, the band played the End of the Road Festival in England, sharing a stage with prominent acts such as Joanna Newsom, Lykke Li and Beirut.

In Summer 2012, Emanuel and the Fear played the Haldern Pop Festival, sharing a stage with such notable acts as Wilco, The War on Drugs, The Maccabees and fellow Brooklyn-natives Here We Go Magic. Fall 2012 saw the release of the band's second full-length record, The Janus Mirror, on Eat Fear Records (US) and Haldern Pop (Europe). Prior to the release, the band previewed new tracks on Break Thru Radio. The band has stated the record is about 'change' and "...deals with the over-filled human experience in today's silicone world... [it's] our eyes, it is the point between the world outside and the world in our minds." After a sell-out record release party at Mercury Lounge in New York City, the band headed overseas for another tour, including several stops in Germany.

In June 2013, Emanuel and the Fear performed a session on Daytrotter where they played a collection of tracks from their previous releases. In late Summer 2013, the band began work on their as-yet-to-be-titled fifth release. The record is due out in 2014. In December 2013, lead singer Emanuel Ayvas embarked on his first solo-tour throughout Europe and the UK.

== Reception ==
Earmilk described their sound as "an extraordinary orchestra-rock band that focuses on intertwining the modern day pop song with extravagant and complex composition. Drawing from romantic and modern composers like Beethoven, Rachmaninoff, and Glass; and then fusing in a modern rock sound like Arcade Fire, Bright Eyes, Daft Punk and Sufjan Stevens; Emanuel and the Fear displays a true understanding of sound all-the-while capturing audiences with their climactic electro/orchestral arrangements and quivering, poetic lyrics." The band has said they are influenced by the Beatles, Bob Dylan, Neil Young and Igor Stravinsky. Village Voice has compared them to Arcade Fire and The Polyphonic Spree. They have also been compared to ELO.

== Band members ==
Formerly an elaborate 11-piece rock outfit, the band currently consists of six members.

Current

- Emanuel Ayvas - vocals, keys, guitar, harmonica
- Jeff Gretz - drums
- Ben Backus - bass
- Nic Cowles - synth, flute
- Liz Hanley - violin, vocals
- Sarah Haines - viola, vocals

Former

- Dallin Applebaum - vocals, synth
- Dan Tirer - guitar
- Tom Swafford - violin
- Brian Sanders - cello
- David Nelson - trombone
- Chris Coletti - trumpet
- Colin Dean - bass
- Gil Goldin - bass

== Discography ==
Year	Record	Label
2009	Emanuel and the Fear EP	Paper Garden Records
2009	The Perfect Me (single) covering Deerhoof	
2010	Listen	Paper Garden Records
2011	Hands (EP)	Eat Fear Records (US), Haldern Pop (Europe/UK)
2012	The Janus Mirror	Eat Fear Records (US), Haldern Pop (Europe/UK), Moorworks (Japan)
2016	Primitive Smile	Listen Records
