= Out for Blood (Farewell Flight album) =

Studio album by Farewell Flight
- Released: July 12, 2011
- Genre: Rock; Indie; Pop
- Length: 50:44
- Label: Mono vs. Stereo

Farewell Flight chronology
| Sound.Color.Motion. (2007) | Out for Blood (2011) |

Out for Blood is the second album by the American rock band Farewell Flight, released in 2011. The album is composed mostly of tracks from the band's 2007 release Sound.Color.Motion., but does include the new tracks Out For Blood & Rope. The Amazon.com digital version contains the bonus track Omaha Beach.

== Track listing ==
All tracks are written by Luke Foley & Farewell Flight.

| No. | Title | Length |
|---|---|---|
| 1. | "Sailor's Mouth" | 4:07 |
| 2. | "Begin Again" | 3:26 |
| 3. | "Over" | 5:19 |
| 4. | "Out for Blood" | 4:16 |
| 5. | "America Will Break Your Heart" | 3:36 |
| 6. | "Cruel" | 3:45 |
| 7. | "Widower" | 4:00 |
| 8. | "Indianapolis" | 3:36 |
| 9. | "Phones" | 4:19 |
| 10. | "Rope" | 4:41 |
| 11. | "A Lullaby for Insomniacs" | 2:41 |
| 12. | "Slow" | 3:38 |
