= Dead Boots =

American indie rock band

- Origin: Duxbury, Massachusetts, United States
- Genres: Rock, indie rock, alternative rock, garage rock revival, post-punk revival, pop rock
- Years active: 2006–2015
- Label: North Street Records (as TAB the Band) Professor Vegas Music (as Dead Boots)
- Members: Adrian Perry; Tony Perry; Ben Tileston; Lou Jannetty
- Website: Official website

Dead Boots were an American indie rock band from Duxbury, Massachusetts. The band was formerly known as TAB the Band. Formed in December 2006, the group consisted of brothers Adrian Perry (lead vocals/bass) and Tony Perry (guitar), and Ben Tileston (drums). Adrian and Tony Perry are both sons of Aerosmith guitarist Joe Perry. In August 2008, Lou Jannetty (rhythm guitar) joined the band.

== History ==
The band has released four full-length albums: Pulling Out Just Enough to Win (Jan. 2008), Long Weekend (Aug. 2008), Zoo Noises (Jan. 2010), and Verónica (July 2013). Rolling Stone described the band as "…they play bluesy, sleazy guitar raunch," and gave 3.5 stars to Pulling Out Just Enough to Win.

The band has toured the US, UK, and Canada as openers for the likes of Modest Mouse, Jane's Addiction, Slash, Stone Temple Pilots, Black Rebel Motorcycle Club, and Cage the Elephant. Festivals that the band has played include Lollapalooza, SXSW, Mountain Jam, CMJ Music Marathon, Download Festival, and Festival Dete De Quebec. They also headlined a John Varvatos Thursday Night Live event at 315 Bowery, and performed at the Boston Strong concert. And in 2011, Little Steven's Underground Garage on SIRIUS XM selected their song "Run Away" as the "Coolest Song in the World." In 2015, the band released three covers: "Quinn the Eskimo (Mighty Quinn)," "Da Doo Ron Ron." and "I'm Into Something Good."

== Members ==
- Tony Perry (guitar)
- Adrian Perry (vocals, bass)
- Ben Tileston (drums)
- Louie Jannetty (guitar)

== Discography ==
- Pulling Out Just Enough to Win LP (January 2008, North Street Records)
- Long Weekend LP (August 2008, North Street Records)
- Zoo Noises LP (January 2010, North Street Records)
- Verónica (July 2013, Professor Vegas Music)

== Television, Film, & Other Placements ==
- Netflix's Ozark – "Old Folks Home"
- CBS' Criminal Minds – "Be My Valentine"
- FOX's The Mick – "Looking Pretty, Pretty"
- TNT's Good Behavior – "Apple of an Eye"
- Dirty Grandpa - "Bought and Sold" and "Because I Want To"
- HBO's Silicon Valley – "Backseat Lover"
- HBO's Entourage – "Looking Pretty, Pretty"
- MLB 2K11 Video Game – "Bought and Sold"
- ESPN's Page 2 Podcast – "Bought and Sold" (theme song/house band)
- Hulu's The Mindy Project - "Run Away" & "I Don't Mind If You Cry"
- SWAT Firefight (Sony Films) – "On Course"
- MTV's Jersey Shore – "A Girl Like You," "Antitrust," and "Backseat Lover"
- MTV's 10 on Top – "My Baby is Fine" and "Because I Want To"
- MTV's My Life As Liz – "It's Over"
- CBS' CSI: Crime Scene Investigation – "Looking Pretty, Pretty"
- CBS' Criminal Minds – "Be My Valentine"
- CBS' CSI: NY – "Masked Bandit"
- ABC Family's Switched at Birth - "On the Rocks"
- Oxfam America's "Make Some Noise" compilation – "Little Water" (2012) & "I Believe in Love" (2013)
- Vans Warped Tour's No Room For Rock Stars – "Bought and Sold" & "Bobby & Jane"
- Vans Triple Crown – "Sticky Wickets"
- Vans US Open of Surfing - "Sticky Wickets"
- FC Bayern Champions League Finale - "My Baby is Fine" (2012) and "Saturdays" (2013)
- Fuel TV – "Skip Your Class," "Looking Pretty, Pretty," & "Mitch Connor"
- WEtv's Sunset Daze – "Old Folks Home"
- Reese's Pieces – "The House of El Ron"

== TV appearances and radio broadcasts ==
- mtvU
- FUSE
- Fox's Fearless Music TV
- JBTV
- 101.9 RXP – Matt Pinfield's The Rock Show
- Q104.3 – Out of the Box with Jonathan Clarke
- Little Steven's Underground Garage

== Music videos ==
- She Said No (I Love You)
- Where She Was on Monday
- Saturdays (directed by Dave Hill)
