= Pulling Out Just Enough to Win =

Studio album by TAB the Band
- Released: January 2008
- Studio: Vindaloo Studio in Hanover, Massachusetts
- Genre: Rock and roll
- Label: North Street Records

TAB the Band chronology
Pulling Out Just Enough to Win (2008)	Long Weekend (2008)

Professional ratings
Review scores
Source	Rating
Blender	3/5 stars
Blogcritics.org	(favorable)
Christgau's Consumer Guide	(1-star Honorable Mention)
PopMatters	7/10 stars
Rolling Stone	3.5/5 stars

Pulling Out Just Enough to Win is the debut album by American rock band TAB the Band (now known as Dead Boots), released in January 2008 on North Street Records. It was recorded at Aerosmith's Vindaloo Studio in Hanover, Massachusetts. The Boston Phoenix's Jim Sullivan wrote that the album was "...chock-a-block with classic-sounding rock influenced by Aerosmith, the Rolling Stones, and the Who. The songs have a whiff of raunch, a little snarl, and a parcel of hooks. “Secretary’s Day,” the single, is a sizzler, but the entire album kicks ass in a smart way — with short, sharp shocks."

== Track listing ==
1. Le Colonelle – 2:38
2. Secretary's Day – 2:59
3. Paid For By – 2:37
4. The House Of El Ron – 2:40
5. CYT – 3:54
6. The Continental, TBE – 2:40
7. The Conversion – 3:18
8. Chuckles – 3:28
9. Mitch Connor – 3:34
10. Anti Trust – 3:06
11. The Captain – 3:01
