= Hank & Cupcakes =

Atlanta-based indie rock–pop duo

- Origin: Tel Aviv, Israel
- Genres: Alternative, Indie pop, Indie rock, grunge, Post-punk
- Years active: 2008–present
- Label: BMG Rights Management
- Members: Sagit Shir (born September 5, 1980) Ariel Scherbacovsky (born October 27, 1979)
- Website: http://www.hankandcupcakes.com

Hank & Cupcakes are an Atlanta-based indie rock–pop duo formed in 2008 in Tel Aviv, Israel. The group consists of husband-and-wife Ariel "Hank" Scherbacovsky (bass guitar) and Sagit "Cupcakes" Shir (drums, vocals). They took their name as a reference to Hank Chinaski, the literary alter ego of American writer Charles Bukowski and one of his real-life lovers, Pamela "Cupcakes" Wood. On October 22, 2012, the band released their Ain't No Love EP on BMG Rights Management, with the first single "Sweet Potion" being premiered by MTV Hive on October 9, 2012. Their full-length debut album, Naked, was released July 2, 2013. The group's second LP, Cash 4 Gold, followed in 2014. Their third album, Cheap Thrill, was released July 1, 2016.

== History ==
=== Early history ===
The couple first met when they were nineteen years old while playing in a band in the Israeli Army in 1999. Shir was a singer in the band, while Scherbacovsky was the sound technician. The couple continued to play music together in different projects following their time in the army, starting with a cover band performing songs by The Beatles, Suzanne Vega, Tori Amos and Paul Simon. They eventually founded a band called Maim Shketim (Hebrew for "silent water") with guitarist Ronnie Reshef in 2002, and began writing original songs and developing their own musical style, eventually releasing an album entitled Observations. The trio broke up four years later when guitarist Reshef relocated to New York City to study classical composition in 2006. Shir and Scherbacovsky were married that summer in Tel Aviv.

=== Beginnings of the band ===
In 2007, the couple decided to study Cuban music in Havana, Cuba and enrolled in Spanish classes at Havana University to obtain student visas. Once there, they studied privately with drummer Ramses Rodriguez Baralt, who has played and recorded with world-renowned jazz musicians such as Chucho Valdés, Ibrahim Ferrer and Roberto Fonseca. Shir and Scherbacovsky practiced four to seven hours a day in addition to studying music theory and attending classes at the university. Originally, they had planned on staying in Cuba for an entire year but the stress of living under a totalitarian regime became very difficult for the couple and they returned to Israel six months later. During this transitional period, they began working on new material together (which would later become the music of Hank & Cupcakes) and realized they needed a change to expose themselves to new things to continue growing and evolving as artists. They set their eyes on New York where they assumed they would meet other musicians to fill out the rest of their band. However, after rehearsing daily for several months together, Shir and Scherbacovsky discovered that they had found their musical style and didn't need other musicians to complete the group. Shortly thereafter, Hank & Cupcakes had their first-ever performance at Sublime Club on April 23, 2008 in Tel Aviv.

The couple relocated to Williamsburg, Brooklyn, in August 2008 where they rented a rehearsal studio and, feeling inspired by the city, began writing more songs and performing in small New York venues such as Crash Mansion and Cameo Gallery. At their first show, they had only 13 guests – including Scherbacovsky's parents who were visiting from Jerusalem. But the band never turned down a show and soon found themselves doing three to four concerts every week, building a reputation for their "infectious energy" and "explosive live show" with each successive performance.

In October 2009, Hank & Cupcakes were asked to play in front of a live audience on the Fox TV show, Fearless Music. After the taping, the owner of Fearless Music at that time, Lee Heiman (former manager of Sugar Ray, The Smithereens, Mike Peters), signed on to be the duo's manager. Over the course of the next two years, the bass-and-drum duo developed a rabid fanbase in New York City and slowly made their mark in the United States as they began playing more shows outside of New York. The band played select dates across Europe and the Middle East, including playing to crowds of over 2,000 in Barcelona and opening for Placebo at the first ever Pic.Nic festival in Tel Aviv.

Hank & Cupcakes were soon invited to play all over the United States at such festivals such as CMJ Music Marathon in 2010 as well as The Bamboozle and The Roots Picnic in 2011, and were named as one of 15 artists the Huffington Post predicted to break out that year. The band continued to perform extensively throughout 2011, finishing with a sold-out New Year's Eve show with DJ/producer Deadmau5 at Hudson River Pier 36.

=== Naked (2011–2013) ===
In 2011 Shir and Scherbacovsky were offered a publishing deal by Chrysalis Music prior to the company being sold to BMG Rights Management, who still decided to move forward with the contract. In August of that year, the band unveiled a music video for their song "HIT" which Shir and Scherbacovsky wrote in response to someone in the music industry telling their manager that the duo were "cool" but lacked a hit single. That same month, using the money from the publishing deal, they recorded their first full-length album with Swedish producer and guitarist, Ludwig Böss, at the legendary Hansa Studios in Berlin where landmark albums from such artists as David Bowie, Iggy Pop, Depeche Mode, Nick Cave, R.E.M., U2 and many more were recorded. Just before the band was to release the album, BMG offered the band a record deal. The label had them improve the recordings and subsequently the album's release date was delayed until early 2013.

In March 2012 "Liquid Mercury" the first single off their forthcoming album debuted at No. 38 on Billboard's Top 40. They were also invited to record and film a live version of their track "Sweet Potion" at Adrian Grenier's private studio, the Wreckroom, in June 2012. Upon the release of their three-track Ain't No Love EP on October 22, 2012, Hank & Cupcakes premiered the "Sweet Potion" music video on VICE's music discover site, Noisey. Acclaimed producer and DJ, RJD2, later collaborated with the band to create a remix of the track which Prefix called "a serious heart pounding infectious number" when they premiered it on February 8, 2013. In March 2013 Hank & Cupcakes played several sold out shows during SXSW. In April 2013 the band's frustrations with their label came to a head. BMG refused to release the Aint No Love EP worldwide and were also refusing to release the album Naked! unless new songs were co-written with external writers. On April 18, 2013 Hank & Cupcakes gave legal notice to BMG that they were terminating their record contract. Shortly after the separation from BMG, on July 2, 2013, Hank & Cupcakes released their debut album Naked independently and toured for the remainder of 2013.

=== Cash For Gold (2014–2015) ===
By 2014 the band had discontinued professional relationships with its management, booking agent and PR team and transitioned into a fully independent format. Hank & Cupcakes started to learn how to independently create all their audio, visual and graphic content and began writing and recording their second record Cash For Gold which was released September 5, 2014. Parts of the record were recorded in various locations in NYC such as the American Museum of Natural History and various subway stations around the city. The album cover as well the music video for the song "Spin" were the fruit of a collaboration with internationally acclaimed fashion photographer Javier Ortega. Hank & Cupcakes released four singles from the album which were accompanied by music videos: "Countdown", "Cocaina", "Bat Your Eyelids" and "Relax". The band later released additional videos for "Shut Up" and "Spin". The band toured extensively in support of Cash For Gold, playing over 200 club dates and over a dozen festivals across North America including Milwaukee's Summerfest, and Voodo Music + Arts Experience in New Orleans.

=== Cheap Thrill (2016–present) ===
In late 2015 after the Cash for Gold Tour ended, the band relocated to Atlanta to write and record their third album Cheap Thrill. The record which was released in July 2016, was produced by Van Goose, mixed and engineered by Ariel Scherbacovskly and mastered by Mark B. Christensen. The album art is a collaboration with Mexican artist Claudio Limon.

== Musical style ==
Hank & Cupcakes draw a lot of inspiration from the events of their life and the energy of New York City with its vibrant streets, nonstop movement, graffiti, and art in addition their time of musical exploration in Cuba. Quick rhythms and bass playing define their musical style, combining heavy drumming with funky disco riffs and synthpop elements. Their sound has often been described as a "huge wall of sound," sonically rich and full as if there were more than just two members in the band. The duo have managed to create a new hybrid of indietronic music with their unique fusion of disco and funk rhythmic patterns, raw dance beats, groove-laden bass lines, rambunctious synths, sturdy hooks, emotive vocals and catchy lyrics. Shir's powerful, edgy voice brings to mind Katie White of The Ting Tings and Beth Ditto of Gossip, while the band's music has also drawn comparisons to The Ting Tings and the Yeah Yeah Yeahs.

== Discography ==
=== Albums ===
- Naked (BMG Rights Management, July 2, 2013)
- Cash 4 Gold (September 5, 2014)
- Cheap Thrill (July 1, 2016)

=== EPs ===
- Ain't No Love EP (BMG Rights Management, October 2012)
- Naked B Side EP (July 2, 2013)

=== Singles ===
- "She's Lost Control" – Joy Division cover (Spin 360, February 2012)
- "Liquid Mercury"
- "Sweet Potion"
- "Cocaina" (February 3, 2013)
- "Countdown" (December 6, 2013)
- "Bat Your Eyelids"
- "Relax"
