= Fearless Music =

- Starring: Jamie Lamm; Monica Castellanos, Samantha Hurdich, Kris Soponpong, Zack Herman, Francis Dahl
- Theme music composer: Jamie Lamm
- No. of seasons: 9
- No. of episodes: over 300

Production
- Production locations: Crash Mansion rock club, New York City
- Running time: 23 minutes

Original release
- Network: WNYW, syndicated
- Release: January 18, 2004 – December 4, 2010

Fearless Music is a televised musical showcase broadcast between 2004 and 2010 which featured live performances from up-and-coming acts, primarily from the alternative rock and indie rock circuits. It was filmed at the Crash Mansion rock club in New York City.

The show aired at 12:30am on Saturdays on WNYW Fox 5 and was syndicated in over 200 cities in the United States, 350 college TV stations, and worldwide through Voice of America.

== History ==
The show was founded by its producer and lead host, Jamie Lamm, whose career as a multi-instrumentalist had been inspired by rock documentaries and musical showcase series that aired when he was younger, including The Midnight Special and The Old Grey Whistle Test. The name "fearless" referred to the show taking a chance on musicians that other mainstream media would be afraid to promote. In August 2003, Fearless Music began taping artists in New York City.

The first episode aired on New York's local Time Warner Cable channel on January 18, 2004. Despite high-quality audio, due to the show's low budget, it was filmed using three CCTV home security cameras.

The show moved forward on Fox and its affiliates, airing on more stations beginning April 1, 2006. Studio lights and HD cameras were also installed for an improved look.

On October 12, 2008, the show launched its own YouTube channel, providing clips from band performances on the show, as well as some full episodes.

By the end of 2008, nearly 1,500 bands had appeared on the show; however, the show's parent company, Fearless Music Inc., filed for Chapter 11 bankruptcy to get out of its $100,000 debts.

The show continued for three further seasons until its final broadcast on December 4, 2010. On March 24, 2011, it was announced that Union Square would acquire Fearless Music Television, but no further episodes were made and the acquisition was cancelled on March 24, 2012.

== Format ==
The show consisted of seven bands and one short interview segment. The first six bands were performances recorded in the Crash Mansion rock club in New York City.

Viewers could then vote for their favorite artist at FearlessMusic.com during the following days. The final performance would be from the band that won the previous week's online poll.

== Episodes ==
=== Season 8 ===
No.	Original release date	Performances by
8–01	October 10, 2009	Emanuel and the Fear, Juliette Lewis, Fritz Helder and the Phantoms, Aimee Allen, Maxïmo Park
8–02	October 24, 2009	Gwar, Hank and Cupcakes, My Dear Disco, Marcy Playground, Tally Hall, MxPx, Emanuel and the Fear
8–03	October 31, 2009	Bouncing Souls, Sister Hazel, Your Vegas, ApSci, Shinobi Ninja, Via Audio, Hank and Cupcakes
8–04	November 7, 2009	The 69 Eyes, Mike Relm, Gwar, Previously On Lost, Midnight Juggernauts, Semi Precious Weapons, Shinobi Ninja
8–05	November 21, 2009	The Giraffes, Hank and Cupcakes, Emanuel and the Fear, The Bleeding Bombshells, The States, Unisex Salon, The 69 Eyes
8–06	November 28, 2009	Shaka Ponk, Lights, Rusted Root, Poison The Well, Hey Ocean!, TAB The Band, Emanuel and the Fear
8–07	December 5, 2009	Dragonette, Cartel, Wax Tailor, Hellogoodbye, Stalkers, Electric Black, Shaka Ponk
8–08	December 12, 2009	Morningwood, Noah and the Whale, The Dangerous Summer, Saint Motel, Chris Garneau, Phenomenal Handclap Band, Dragonette
8–09	December 19, 2009	The Little Death, Shwayze, Midnight Juggernauts, Apache Beat, The Asteroids Galaxy Tour
8–10	December 26, 2009	The Urgency, Harper Blynn, Bad Rabbits, Shinobi Ninja, Hank and Cupcakes, Morningwood
8–11	January 16, 2010	This Is A Shakedown!, Hellogoodbye, Electric Touch, Cartel, The Grates, Closure in Moscow, The Urgency
8–12	January 23, 2010	Nico Vega, Los Amigos Invisibles, Beautiful Small Machines, Hot Chelle Rae, Your Vegas, Shaka Ponk, This Is A Shakedown!
8–13	January 30, 2010	Unisex Salon, Lights, Dragonette, Kicking Daisies, Dan Torres, Gwar, Hot Chelle Rae
8–14	February 6, 2010	Apoptygma Berzerk, The Bouncing Souls, Detox Retox, Wax Tailor, Atomic Tom, Hey Ocean!, Kicking Daisies
8–15	February 13, 2010	The 69 Eyes, Brokencyde, Lucy Woodward, Fritz Helder and the Phantoms, Bad Rabbits, Stalkers, Atomic Tom

=== Season 9 ===
No.	Original release date	Performances by
9–01	May 8, 2010	Shiny Toy Guns, The Ark, KT Tunstall, Morningwood, Oh No Not Stereo
9–02	May 15, 2010	The Ark, White Lies, Never Shout Never, Unisex Salon, Good Old War
9–03	May 22, 2010	Hot Chip, Gym Class Heroes, Nico Vega, Anarbor, The Blue Van
9–04	May 29, 2010	Imogen Heap, Elbow, The Fratellis, The Audition, Your Vegas
9–05	June 5, 2010	Fujiya & Miyagi, Chris Stills, The Mary Onettes, Gwar, Shaka Ponk
9–06	June 12, 2010	The (International) Noise Conspiracy, Klaxons, The Asteroids Galaxy Tour, Hellogoodbye, Wax Tailor
9–07	June 19, 2010	Mad Caddies, Lights, Silversun Pickups, Cartel, TAB the Band
9–08	June 26, 2010	Straylight Run, The Living End, Aimee Allen, Totally Michael, Noah and the Whale
9–09	July 3, 2010	The Maccabees, Hey Ocean!, Anti-Flag, Shwayze, Streetlight Manifesto
9–10	July 10, 2010	Head Automatica, The Little Deaths, Shiny Toy Guns, Sister Hazel, The 69 Eyes
9–11	July 17, 2010	Supergrass, Maxïmo Park, Dragonette, The Asteroids Galaxy Tour, Midnight Juggernauts
9–12	July 24, 2010	Paramore, Valencia, Beautiful Small Machines, Chris Garneau, Atomic Tom
9–13	July 31, 2010	The Gaslight Anthem, The Futureheads, Los Amigos Invisibles, The Urgency, Hellogoodbye
9–64	December 4, 2010	Crash Kings, The Dangerous Summer, Gwar, Clare & the Reasons, Riverboat Gamblers

== See also ==
- Indie (music)
- College rock
