= Dallin Applebaum =

American singer-songwriter and music producer

Dallin Applebaum is an American songwriter, pianist, vocalist and music producer based in New York City, best known for her work with Rachel Platten, Ryan Star, Emmanuel & the Fear and Skyes.

Her song "I'm That Girl", released under the name Alise Indall, was featured in 2018 Winter Olympics promos celebrating American female athletes. In addition to releasing recordings as a solo artist and with her band Skyes, Applebaum has also recorded with Matchbox20 Rachel Platten Phillip Phillips Darlene Love and Nigel Stanford. While Applebaum is a classically-trained pianist, her writing and production has often incorporated extensive use of live and studio electronics.
