= Emanuel Ayvas =

American musician

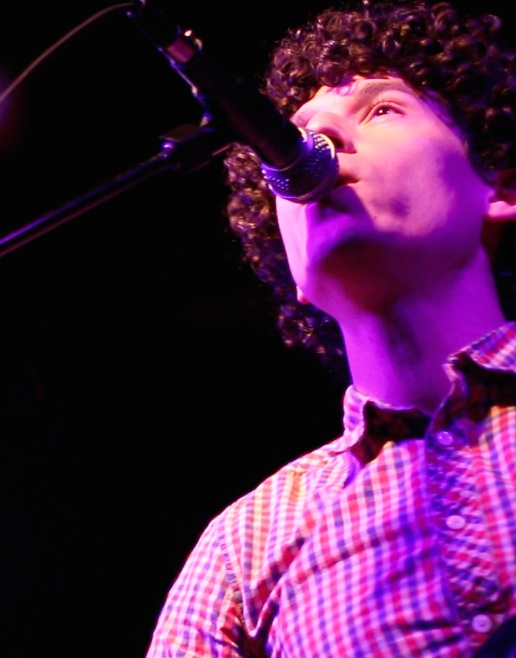
- Ayvas performs at Bowery Electric in NYC, 2013.

Background information
- Born: Emanuel Ayvas; June 19, 1983 (age 43); Wood-Ridge, New Jersey, U.S.
- Genres: Indie rock, symphonic rock
- Occupations: Singer, Songwriter, Composer
- Instruments: Guitar, Piano, Harmonica
- Years active: 2005 – present
- Labels: Haldern Pop; Paper Garden
- Member of: Emanuel and the Fear
- Website: www.emanuelayvas.com

Emanuel Ayvas (born June 19, 1983) is an American musician best known as the lead vocalist and guitarist of symphonic rock band Emanuel and the Fear. Emanuel currently resides in Brooklyn, New York.

== Early life ==
Born in Wood-Ridge, New Jersey, Emanuel began playing the piano when he was five-years-old. After graduating high school, he initially attended college at Rutgers University before transferring to the University of North Carolina where he competed as a pole vaulter prior to shifting his focus to music.

== Career ==
=== Early work ===
Emanuel graduated from UNC in 2005 and formed his first band, Motion Commotion. After playing for less than a year, the band scored a deal with indie label Piermont Records and released their first self-titled EP in October 2006. The EP included the band's first single ‘BBC Sue.’ After a small US tour alongside Farewell Flight, the band parted ways and Emanuel relocated to Los Angeles.

=== Emanuel and the Fear ===
Emanuel moved back to the East Coast and formed Emanuel and the Fear in Brooklyn, New York in 2008. Formerly an elaborate 11-piece rock outfit, the band currently consists of six members. The band is best known for "intertwining the modern day pop song with extravagant and complex composition." They have often been compared to Arcade Fire.

Emanuel and the Fear have released two full-length records and two EP's. Their first full-length record, Listen, received immediate acclaim, including favorable write-ups on Flavorpill, NME, Fearless Music, RCRD LBL, and Deli Magazine.

Since forming, the band has toured the world extensively, sharing the stage with notable artists including Joanna Newsom, The War on Drugs, Wilco, Beirut and Here We Go Magic, to name a few.

They are currently working on their third full-length release, set for release in late 2014.

=== Solo ===
In December 2013, Ayvas embarked on his first solo tour that took him throughout the UK and Europe, including several stops in Germany.

== Musical influences ==
Emanuel is said to be influenced by the likes of Beethoven, Rachmaninoff, Philip Glass, Bob Dylan, The Beatles and Daft Punk.
