= Made (TV series) =

Self-improvement reality television series

- Created by: Bob Kusbit
- Country of origin: United States
- No. of episodes: 280

Production
- Running time: 60 minutes
- Production companies: One Louder Entertainment; Remote Productions

Original release
- Network: MTV
- Release: January 11, 2003 – November 14, 2014

Made is a self-improvement reality television series that aired on MTV. The series followed different people (mainly teenagers) who wanted to be "made" into things like singers, athletes, dancers, skateboarders, etc. They were joined by a "Made Coach", an expert in their chosen field, who tried to help them attain their goals over the course of several weeks. Made documented the process the teenagers underwent while trying to achieve their goals.

== Seasons ==
=== Season 1 ===
Season	Episode	Episode Summary	Premiere date	External Link	Coach
1	1	Diana is made into a cheerleader.	January 11, 2003		Jim McMullan
1	2	The SlyCaps are made into a band.	January 18, 2003		Matt Shelton
1	3	Mike is made into a basketball player.	January 25, 2003		Shane
1	4	Billy is made into an opera singer.	February 1, 2003		Robert White
1	5	Najah is made into a model.	February 8, 2003		Paul Wharton

=== Season 2 ===
Season	Episode	Episode Summary	Premier date	External Link/Notes	Coach
2	1 (6)	Katie is made into a beauty pageant contestant.	June 28, 2003		Katy Johnson
2	2 (7)	Kristen is made into a BMX rider.	July 5, 2003		Large Ray Schlectweg
2	3 (8)	Shonna is made into class president.	July 12, 2003		
2	4 (9)	Beans is made into a high school graduate.	July 19, 2003		Anthony Impelizino
2	5 (10)	Dawn is made into a lifeguard.	July 26, 2003	Final episode with Teresa Mae	Galin Knight
2	6 (11)	Andrew is made into a film director.	August 2, 2003		George Verschoor
2	7 (12)	Jordan S.M is made into a triathlete.	August 9, 2003		

=== Season 3 ===
Season	Episode	Episode Summary	Premier date	External Link	Coach
3	1 (13)	Tony is made into a ladies' man.	September 27, 2003		David Wygant
3	2 (14)	Cynthia is made into a football player.	October 4, 2003		Terry Burton
3	3 (15)	Angie is made into an actress.	October 11, 2003		
3	4 (16)	Johnny is made into a dancer.	October 18, 2003		
3	5 (17)	Andi is made into a homecoming queen.	October 25, 2003		Lori Bergamotto
3	6 (18)	Mike and Justin are made into playwrights.	November 1, 2003		

=== Season 4 ===
Season	Episode	Episode Summary	Premier date	External Link	Coach
4	1 (19)	Britney is made into a Broadway diva.	April 7, 2004		John MacInnis
4	2 (20)	Kitty is made into a pageant queen.	April 14, 2004		Gina Ferrer
4	3 (21)	Scott is made into Mr. North Star.	April 21, 2004		Richie Rains, Traver Rains, Bumblefoot
4	4 (22)	Megan and Katelyn are made into movie stars.	April 28, 2004		Carrie Houk
4	5 (23)	Rachel is made into a formal date.	May 5, 2004		Princess Superstar
4	6 (24)	Ally is made into a hip-hop dancer	April 12, 2004		T.K. Lawrence
4	7 (25)	Heather is made into a skater chick.	May 19, 2004		

=== Season 5 ===
Season	Episode	Episode Summary	Premier date	External Link	Coach
5	1 (26)	Selena is made into a surfer chick.	October 6, 2004	Episode Summary	Brad
5	2 (27)	Richard is made into boyfriend material.	October 13, 2004	Episode Summary	Samantha House
5	3 (28)	Abby is made into a hip hop dancer.	October 20, 2004	Episode Summary	Cedric Crowe
5	4 (29)	Christian is supposed to be made into a football player, but refuses to listen to his female coach and quits.	October 27, 2004	Episode Summary	Kelly Proctor
5	5 (30)	Jackie is made into a talent show chowder.	December 30, 2004	Episode Summary	Brian
5	6 (31)	Krystle is made into Miss Junior.	January 6, 2005	Episode Summary	Ceylone Boothe-Grooms
5	7 (32)	Dov is made into a wrestler.	January 13, 2005	Episode Summary	Gene Mills, Kurt Angle
5	8 (33)	Anna is made into a leading lady.	January 20, 2005	Episode Summary	John O'Connell
5	9 (34)	Lawryn is made into a BMX biker.	January 27, 2005	Episode Summary	Warwick Stevenson
5	10 (35)	Mack is made into a ballet dancer.	February 3, 2005	Episode Summary	Christopher Fleming
5	11 (36)	Ian is made into a salsa dancer.	February 10, 2005	Episode Summary	Shaun Parry
5	12 (37)	Stephanie is made into a basketball player.	February 17, 2005	Episode Summary	Dean

=== Season 6 ===
Season	Episode	Episode Summary	Premier date	External Link	Coach
6	1 (38)	Nile (son of Steven Greenberg) is made into a rapper.	June 29, 2005	Episode Summary	C-Rayz Walz & Toki Wright
6	2 (39)	Sam is made into a girly girl.	July 6, 2005	Episode Summary	Rosalie Michaels
6	3 (40)	Amanda is made into a snowboarder.	July 13, 2005	Episode Summary	Luke 'Dingo' Trembath
6	4 (41)	Brian is made into a ladies' man.	July 20, 2005	Episode Summary	Tariq Nasheed
6	5 (42)	Brittany is made into a prom queen.	July 27, 2005	Episode Summary	Tara Solomon
6	6 (43)	Mary is made into a cheerleader.	October 12, 2005	Episode Summary	Scott
6	7 (44)	Joan is made into a wakeboarder.	October 19, 2005	Episode Summary	Billy Garcia
6	8 (45)	Zach is made into a figure skater.	October 26, 2005	Episode Summary	Dave
6	9 (46)	Bryttni is made into a dancer.	November 2, 2005	Episode Summary	Raquel Garcia
6	10 (47)	Alyssa is made into a comedian.	November 9, 2005	Episode Summary	Jeff Yalden
6	11 (48)	Alaric is made into a rocker.	November 16, 2005	Episode Summary	Kat Auster
6	12 (49)	Josh is made into a soccer player.	November 30, 2005	Episode Summary	Steve Kulpa
6	13 (50)	Nadia is made into a Central Idol.	December 7, 2005	Episode Summary	Seth Rudetsky
6	14 (51)	Genevieve is made into a rapper.	January 2, 2006	Episode Summary	Atllas
6	15 (52)	Stephanie is made into a Miss Teen Arizona contestant	January 9, 2006	Episode Summary	Stacey Momeyer
6	16 (53)	Alexa is made into a battle of the bands singer.	January 16, 2006	Episode Summary	Frank Pino, Jr.
6	17 (54)	Themi is made into a skateboarder.	January 23, 2006	Episode Summary	Ben Ritacco
6	18 (55)	Danielle is made healthier.	January 30, 2006	Episode Summary	Julie
6	19 (56)	Jason is made into a break dancer.	February 6, 2006	Episode Summary	Mr. Freeze

=== Season 7 ===
Season	Episode	Episode Summary	Premier date	External Link	Coach
7	1 (57)	Yazmin is made into a boxer.	May 25, 2006	Episode Summary	Cristy Terhman
7	2 (58)	Marissa is made into a girly girl.	July 7, 2006	Episode Summary	Ashlan Gorse
7	3 (59)	Jordan is made into the Prom King.	July 10, 2006	Episode Summary	Eddie George
7	4 (60)	Lindsay is made into a rugby player.	July 17, 2006	Episode Summary	Greg
7	5 (61)	Dylan is made into a fashion designer.	July 24, 2006	Episode Summary	Rob Younkers
7	6 (62)	Jordan is made into a prom prince.	July 31, 2006	Episode Summary	Shawn
7	7 (63)	Lillie is made into a pageant queen contestant.	August 21, 2006	Episode Summary	Michelle Moore-Galvin
7	8 (64)	Sam is made into a break dancer.	August 14, 2006	Episode Summary	Dredel
7	9 (65)	Katie is made into a prom queen nominee.	August 28, 2006	Episode Summary	Shannon Grace Clark
7	10 (66)	Morgan is made into a cheerleader.	October 9, 2006	Episode Summary	Julian
7	11 (67)	Katie is made into a miss congeniality.	October 16, 2006	Episode Summary	Valerie
7	12 (68)	"Fronz" of Attila (metalcore band) is made into a male model.	October 23, 2006	Episode Summary	Nole
7	13 (69)	Katrina is made into a soccer player.	October 30, 2006	Episode Summary	Matt
7	14 (70)	Keith is made into a ballroom dancer.	November 6, 2006	Episode Summary	Marcus
7	15 (71)	Julie is made into a volleyball player.	November 13, 2006	Episode Summary	Jeanne
7	16 (72)	Brandin is made into homecoming king.	November 20, 2006	Episode Summary	Ian Rosenberger

=== Season 8 (SuperMADE) ===
Season	Episode	Episode Summary	Premier date	External Link	Coach
8	1 (73)	Abbey, Amanda, and Allisha, known as The Three A's, try out to become an actress on All My Children.	June 30, 2007	Full Episode	Jeff Branson, Melissa Claire Egan, Bobbie Eakes, Tony Braithwaite
8	2 (74)	Jeremy and Chelsey are both made into rock stars and face off in a battle of the bands.	June 30, 2007	Full Episode	Ryan Key
8	3 (75)	Diem, reality star from Real World/Road Rules Challenge, is made into a salsa dancer.	June 30, 2007	Full Episode	Paul
8	4 (76)	Jenna and her team of small-town cheerleaders become a superior cheerleading team.	October 8, 2007	Full Episode	Brandon Quillette
8	5 (77)	Mosher family are made into a healthier family and Cindy Mosher loses weight for her 16th birthday.	October 7, 2007	Full Episode	Alicia Marie
8	6 (78)	Josh, formerly of Season 6, is made into a fashion journalist.	October 7, 2007	Full Episode	Nolé Marin
8	7 (79)	Ashley and Jessica are made into motocross racers.	October 7, 2007	Full Episode	Ryan Hughes
8	8 (80)	Stephanie, a party girl, is made into a brainiac.	November 18, 2007	Full Episode	Rob Masek
8	9 (81)	Krystine, a tomboy, is made into a plus-size model.	November 18, 2007	Full Episode	Sharon Quinn
8	10 (82)	Chris is made from geek to chic.	November 18, 2007	Full Episode	John Battaglia
8	11 (83)	Kevin is made into a triathlete.	November 18, 2007	Full Episode	Shaun Brady
8	12 (84)	Whitley is made into a boxer.	January 7, 2008	Full Episode	Maureen Shea
8	13 (85)	Colin is made into a rapper.	January 12, 2008	Full Episode	Talib Kweli
8	14 (86)	Jessica is made into a figure skater.	January 12, 2008	Full Episode	Elizabeth Reed
8	15 (87)	Bryce is made into a ballroom dancer.	January 12, 2008	Full Episode	Phillip
8	16 (88)	Erick is made into a soap star.	January 12, 2008	Full Episode	Jacob Young
8	17 (89)	Sarah is made into a ballerina.	January 12, 2008	Full Episode	Robert Sher-Machherndl
8	18 (90)	Samantha is made into an ice hockey player.	February 1, 2008	Full Episode	Carisa Zaban
8	19 (91)	Tara is made into a snowboarder.	February 2, 2008	Full Episode	Jesse Csincsak
8	20 (92)	Kelly is made into a pageant queen.	February 16, 2008	Full Episode	Jacqueline Bradley
8	21 (93)	Hallie is made into a hip hop dancer.	February 16, 2008	Full Episode	Cici Kelley
8	22 (94)	Aja is made into a debater.	February 16, 2008	Full Episode	Jeff Yalden
8	23 (95)	Chris is made into a professional wrestler.	March 8, 2008	Full Episode	Motor City Machine Guns
8	24 (96)	Andrew is made into a rocker.	April 12, 2008	Full Episode	Sammy James, Jr.
8	25 (97)	Stephen is made into a baseball player.	April 12, 2008	Full Episode	Jonathan Pollard

=== Season 9 ===
Season	Episode	Episode Summary	Premier date	External Link	Coach
9	1 (98)	Vanessa is made into a ballerina to compete with Kevin (episode 2) in their school's talent show.	April 12, 2008	Full Episode	Karine Plantadit
9	2 (99)	Kevin is made into a tap dancer and competes with Vanessa (episode 1) in their school's talent show.	April 12, 2008	Full Episode	Dormeshia Sumbry-Edwards, Omar Edwards
9	3 (100)	Deanna is made into a model.	June 5, 2008	Full Episode	Stacey McKenzie
9	4 (101)	Ryan is made into a martial artist.	June 14, 2008	Full Episode	Chan Lee
9	5 (102)	John is made into the prom king.	June 14, 2008	Full Episode	Deon
9	6 (103)	Dyanna is made into a pageant queen.	June 12, 2008	Full Episode	Kyle Haggerty
9	7 (104)	Leighann is made into a Stars Dancer.	June 14, 2008	Full Episode	Marilu Harman
9	8 (105)	Adam is made into a model.	July 20, 2008	Full Episode	Michael Maddox
9	9 (106)	Rachel is made from geek to chic.	June 14, 2008	Full Episode	Keri Murphy
9	10 (107)	Linnea is made into a beatboxer.	June 14, 2008	Full Episode	Rabbi Darkside
9	11 (108)	Rian is made into Mr. CHS.	July 20, 2008	Full Episode	Jackie Bruno
9	12 (109)	Kady is made into a motocross rider.	July 20, 2008	Full Episode	Kyle Williams
9	13 (110)	Diana has a dream date.	July 20, 2008	Full Episode	Stephanie Myers
9	14 (111)	Courtney is made into an ice hockey player.	August 10, 2008	Full Episode	Chad Dlugolecki
9	15 (112)	Danielle is made into a martial artist.	August 10, 2008	Full Episode	Alec Shane
9	16 (113)	Shelby is made into a beauty queen.	August 10, 2008	Full Episode	Tiffany Ogle
9	17 (114)	Alex is made into a skateboarder.	August 10, 2008	Full Episode	Holly Lyons, Alex Azzi
9	18 (115)	Jill is made into a surfer.	September 13, 2008	Full Episode	Aimee Vogelgesang
9	19 (116)	Marie is made into a hip hop dancer.	September 13, 2008	Full Episode	Sam Renzetti
9	20 (117)	Sidhant is made into a football player.	October 5, 2008	Full Episode	Roland Williams
9	21 (118)	Courtney is made into a BMX racer.	September 13, 2008	Full Episode	Jason Carnes
9	22 (119)	Whitney Jo is made into a figure skater.	October 5, 2008	Full Episode	Lauren Shmalo
9	23 (120)	Kateryna is made into a beauty queen.	October 5, 2008	Full Episode	Kandice Pelletier
9	24 (121)	Brandon is made into a triathlete.	October 5, 2008	Full Episode	Alicia Marie
9	25 (122)	Anna, Keia, and Leisha are made into models.	November 12, 2008	Full Episode	Glamo and Julie Marie Carrier
9	26 (123)	Amanda and Natalie are made into survivalists.	November 1, 2008	Full Episode	Erik Schlimmer
9	27 (124)	Cody is made into a bodybuilder.	November 1, 2008	Full Episode	Peter Putnam
9	28 (125)	Jamie is made into a streamer. Her high school dance team.	November 1, 2008	Full Episode	Gina Capelli- Mormando
9	29 (126)	Andrea is made into a homecoming queen.	December 6, 2008	Full Episode	Veronica Varlow
9	30 (127)	Michelle is made into a rock star.	December 6, 2008	Full Episode	Justin Tranter
9	31 (128)	Avery is made into a basketball player.	December 6, 2008	Full Episode	Chantelle Anderson
9	32 (129)	Tanner is made into a hip hop dancer.	December 6, 2008	Full Episode	Kamilah Barrett
9	33 (130)	James is made into a ladies' man.	January 10, 2009	Full Episode	Rebecca Brody
9	34 (131)	Brandon is made into a ladies' man.	January 10, 2009	Full Episode	Dana
9	35 (132)	Richard is made into a ladies' man.	January 10, 2009	Full Episode	Dr. Alduan Tartt
Made	Special	Abby, Eddie, and Christine are made into hip hop dancers.	January 10, 2009	Full Episode	Cici Kelley, Cedric Crowe, Sam Renzetti

=== Season 10 ===
Season	Episode	Episode Summary	Premier date	External Link	Coach
10	1 (133)	Angelica is made into a pageant queen.	February 21, 2009	Full Episode	Yolanda Makle
10	2 (134)	Carrie is made into a power girlie girl.	February 21, 2009	Full Episode	Hitha Prabhaker
10	3 (135)	Katie and the New Iberia Senior High cheerleaders are made into a superior cheerleading squad.	February 28, 2009	Full Episode	Lisa Shaliko
10	4 (136)	Jenna and Sabrina are made into mixed martial artists.	March 14, 2009	Full Episode	Brenda Brown
10	5 (137)	Erin is made into a boxer.	March 14, 2009	Full Episode	Kenny Porter
10	6 (138)	Wyatt is made into a boxer.	April 4, 2009	Full Episode	Melissa Hernández
10	7 (139)	Matthew is made into a boxer.	April 4, 2009	Full Episode	Patrick Cross
10	8 (140)	Jessica is made into a rockstar.	April 11, 2009	Full Episode	Josh Ocean
10	9 (141)	Gracie is made into a punk rocker.	April 11, 2009	Full Episode	Josh Bertrand
10	10 (142)	Alicia is made into a cheerleader.	April 18, 2009	Full Episode	Trisia Brown
10	11 (143)	Heather is made into a rapper.	April 18, 2009	Full Episode	Quest Mcody
10	12 (144)	Scott is made into a ladies' man.	May 7, 2009	Full Episode	Shane and Shawn Ward
10	13 (145)	Hannah is made into a rapper.	May 14, 2009	Full Episode	Chiba
10	14 (146)	Kristy is made into a prom queen.	May 11, 2009	Full Episode	Ashley Litton
10	15 (147)	Kaitlin is made into a motocross racer.	May 28, 2009	Full Episode	Malcolm McCassy
10	16 (148)	Amanda is made into a dancer.	June 4, 2009	Full Episode	Asia
10	17 (149)	Ethan is made into a ladies' man.	June 12, 2009	Full Episode	No Limit Larry
10	18 (150)	Abby, Pat and Megan are made into hip hop dancers.	June 27, 2009	Full Episode	Marcos Aguirre, Ernest "E-Knock" Phillips, Suzette Sagisi
10	19 (151)	Sarah is made into a beauty queen.	June 27, 2009	Full Episode	Rocky Graziano
10	20 (152)	Becca is made into a pro wrestler	September 6, 2009	Full Episode	A.J. Styles
10	21 (153)	Carter is made into a body builder.	September 12, 2009	Full episode	Doug Dolphin
10	22 (154)	Kyra is made into a pageant queen.	September 6, 2009	Full Episode	Shilah Phillips
10	23 (155)	Lisa is made into a Latin dancer.	September 12, 2009	Full Episode	Maritza Reveron
10	24 (156)	Shatara is made into a pageant queen.	September 6, 2009	Full Episode	Beaux Wellborn
10	25 (157)	Manny is made into a ladies' man.	September 6, 2009	Full Episode	Deborah Denise Trachtenberg
10	26 (158)	Jade, Jennifer, and Dallis are made into motocross racers.	September 6, 2009	Full Episode	Tyler Evans
10	27 (159)	Deshunae is made into a volleyball player.	September 12, 2009	Full Episode	Cherelle Lampkins
10	28 (160)	Trisha, Joe, and Emily are made into hip hop dancers.	October 10, 2009	Full Episode	Shernita Anderson, Jermel McWilliams, Paranoia
10	29 (161)	Brooke and the cheerleaders of Shikellamy Senior High School are made into a competitive cheerleading squad.	October 17, 2009	Full Episode	Tony Ness
10	30 (162)	The cheerleaders of Brush High School are made into a competitive cheerleading squad.	October 24, 2009	Full Episode	Trisha Hart
10	31 (163)	Alex is made into a ladies' man.	January 2, 2010	Full Episode	Dr. Tiye
10	32 (164)	Brittany is made into a pageant queen.	January 2, 2010	Full Episode	Lakisha Brooks
10	33 (165)	The choir students of Lawrence Central High School are made into a national choir group.	January 2, 2010	Full Episode	* No Made Coach in this episode
10	34 (166)	Cameron is made into a motocross racer.	May 20, 2010	Full Episode	Greg Schnell
10	35 (167)	The Majestic Dance Crew is made into becoming part of America's Best Dance Crew.	January 24, 2010	Full Episode	David Sincere Aiken, Nicole Journey Tullett
10	36 (168)	Amanda is made into an independent woman.	May 18, 2010	Full Episode	Julie Marie Carrier
10	37 (169)	Raine is made into a figure skater.	May 1, 2010	Full Episode	Craig Joeright
10	38 (170)	Mikey wants to be made into a baseball player.	May 1, 2010	Full Episode	Coach Jeremy
10	39 (171)	Breland is made into a basketball player.	May 1, 2010	Full Episode	Cedric Ceballos
10	40 (172)	Ashley is made into a snowboarder.	May 1, 2010	Full Episode	Jesse Csincsak
10	41 (173)	Mikala is made into a ballroom dancer.	August 16, 2010	Full Episode	Ashle Dawson
10	42 (174)	Sharon is made into a rugby player.	August 17, 2010	Full Episode	Phaidra Knight

=== Season 11 ===
Season	Episode	Episode Summary	Premier date	External Link	Coach
11	1 (175)	Jordan is made into a ladies' man.	August 18, 2010	Full Episode	Al Jackson
11	2 (176)	Cheyenne is made into a hip-hop dancer.	August 19, 2010	Full Episode	Taeko Carroll
11	3 (177)	The Miami Beach Senior High Tide Cheerleaders are made into a fit cheer squad.	August 20, 2010	Full Episode	Kimberly Newbern
11	4 (178)	Tommy is made into a filmmaker.	September 27, 2010	Full Episode	Chusy Jardine
11	5 (179)	Sam is made into a hip hop dancer.	September 28, 2010	Full Episode	Tristan Fisher
11	6 (180)	Miranda is made into a lacrosse player.	September 29, 2010	Full Episode	Nicky Polanco
11	7 (181)	Jerick is made into a powerlifter.	September 30, 2010	Full Episode	Johnnie Jackson
11	8 (182)	Emily is made into a mountain biker.	October 4, 2010	Full Episode	Forrest
11	9 (183)	Molly and Taylor are made into extreme survivalists.	December 5, 2010	Full Episode	Cliff Hodges
11	10 (184)	Page is made into a pageant queen.	October 1, 2010	Full Episode	Wendy Foster
11	11 (185)	Alyssa is made into a singer.	October 6, 2010	Full Episode	Edara Johnson & The Sly Caps
11	12 (186)	Wilkerson is made into a hip hop dancer.	October 7, 2010	Full Episode	Neasy
11	13 (187)	Rachel is made into a pageant queen.	October 19, 2010	Full Episode	LauRen Merola
11	14 (188)	Ryan is made into a rapper.	October 5, 2010	Full Episode	Homeboy Sandman
11	15 (189)	Ze is made into a hip hop dancer.	October 20, 2010	Full Episode	Neo Lynch
11	16 (190)	Savannah is made into a BMX racer.	October 15, 2010	Full Episode	Tyler Brown
11	17 (191)	Breezy and Bailey are made into independent twins.	October 13, 2010	Full Episode	Leon Legothetis
11	18 (192)	Angel is made into a baseball player.		Full Episode	Ramsey Washington
11	19 (193)	Tyler loses weight and is made into a healthy high school senior.	October 15, 2010	Full Episode	Kym Perfetto
11	20 (194)	Kylee is made into a bodybuilder.	October 27, 2010	Full Episode	Amy Schmid
11	21 (195)	Alyx is made into a surfer.	October 28, 2010	Full Episode	Alex Grey
11	22 (196)	Brian, Keegan, and Ronnie are made into a boy band	December 5, 2010	Full Episode	Teddy Sandman, Jeff Timmons
11	23 (197)	The Radiance Dance Team is made into a solid and spirited dance team.	December 5, 2010	Full Episode	Victoria Hunt
11	24 (198)	Greg is made into Mr. Barracuda.		Full Episode	Anthony
11	25 (199)	Austin is made into a ladies' man.	January 28, 2011		Sam Boyd and Pete Nagy
11	26 (200)	Natalie is made into a rock star.	January 14, 2011	Full Episode	Shawn Perry
11	27 (201)	Vanessa is made into a fit mom.	January 19, 2011	Full Episode	
11	28 (202)	Torence is made into a football Player.	January 26, 2011	Full Episode	Ray McElroy
11	29 (203)	Eli is made into a superstar diva.	January 28, 2011	Full Episode	Jeremiah
11	30 (204)	Emma is made into a plus size model.		Full Episode	Joanne Borgella
11	31 (205)	Austin is made into a ladies' man.	January 28, 2011	Full Episode	Abiola Abrams
11	32 (206)	Sharon is made into a rockstar.	January 24, 2011	Full Episode	Lisa Rieffel
11	33 (207)	Devon is made into a pageant queen.	February 4, 2011	Full Episode	Kyle Haggerty
11	34 (208)	Michael is made into a soccer player.	February 7, 2011	Full Episode	Danny Cruz
11	35 (209)	The Pittsfield soccer team is made into a cheerleading team.	February 2, 2011	Full Episode	Jason Graham
11	36 (210)	Emily is made into a Latin dancer.	February 9, 2011	Full Episode	Hilary
11	37 (211)	Sam is made into a girly girl.	February 11, 2011	Full Episode	Kristen White
11	38 (212)	James is made into a rapper.	February 16, 2011	Full Episode	Killer Mike
11	39 (213)	Gabby is made into a hip hop dancer.	February 15, 2011	Full Episode	Melissa Benners
11	40 (214)	Kenzie is made into a girly girl.	February 18, 2011	Full Episode	Emily Loftiss
11	41 (215)	The Phoebus High School field hockey team is made into a competitive team.	June 24, 2011	Full Episode	Kelly Smith
11	42 (216)	Kelsie and Jasmin are made into singers.	June 22, 2011	Full Episode	Play-N-Skillz
11	43 (217)	Jolisa is made into a rapper.	June 29, 2011	Full Episode	Kuniva from D12
11	44 (218)	Emma is made into a rapper.	June 23, 2011	Full Episode	P.L.
11	45 (219)	Treasure is made into a pom dancer.	June 23, 2011	Full Episode	Kristin Cara
11	46 (220)	Elizabeth and Rebecca are made into Latin dancers.	June 27, 2011	Full Episode	Edwin Rivera
11	47 (221)	Kionna, Laila, Chazmyn, Veronica, and Shandela are made into pageant queens.	June 30, 2011	Full Episode	Kirsten Haglund
11	48 (222)	Sarah is made into a prom queen.	July 6, 2011	Full Episode	Ashley Burghardt
11	49 (223)	The Inlet Grove high cheer team is made into a respected cheer team.	July 6, 2011	Full Episode	Lisa Czawlytko
11	50 (224)	Jake is made into a ladies' man.	July 8, 2011	Full Episode	Sundai Love
11	51 (225)	Kenna is made into a singer.	July 11, 2011	Full Episode	Donnie Clang
11	52 (226)	Savannah is made into a punk rocker.	July 13, 2011	Full Episode	Lesli Wood
11	53 (227)	Mia is made into a salsa dancer.	July 14, 2011	Full Episode	Desiree Godsell
11	54 (228)	Trey is made into a rapper.	July 18, 2011	Full Episode	Sadat X
11	55 (229)	Ariana is made into a pageant queen.	July 19, 2011	Full Episode	Chelsea Cooley Altman
11	56 (230)	Tarayn is made into a ballerina.	July 21, 2011	Full Episode	Kelly Ann
11	57 (231)	Jermaine is made into a rapper.	July 27, 2011	Full Episode	Rah Digga
11	58 (232)	Rafael is made into a rapper.	July 25, 2011	Full Episode	Killer Mike
11	59 (233)	Rebecca is made into a pageant queen.	July 28, 2011	Full Episode	Jessica Black
11	60 (234)	Angie is made into a pageant queen.	December 3, 2011	Full Episode	Jason Wimberly
11	61 (235)	Emma is made into an adventure racer.	December 10, 2011	Full Episode	Ky Furneaux
11	62 (236)	Brandon is made into a triathlete.	December 15, 2011	Full Episode	Kimberly Schwabenbauer
11	63 (237)	Erica and Taylor are made into rappers.	January 24, 2012	Full Episode	Todd "Speech" Thomas
11	64 (238)	Josh is made into a pro athlete.	December 10, 2011	Full Episode	Daniel Arroyo
11	65 (239)	Lexi is made into a pom dancer.	December 3, 2011	Full Episode	Sabrina Tiller
11	66 (240)	Alissa is made into a hip hop dancer.	December 13, 2011	Full Episode	Bonita "Bgirl Bonita" Lovett
11	67 (241)	Gloria is made into a pageant queen.	December 12, 2011	Full Episode	Chris Saltalamacchio
11	68 (242)	Arjun is made into Mr. Pineview.	December 3, 2011	Full Episode	Jason Crew
11	69 (243)	Anthony is made into ladies' man.	December 13, 2011	Full Episode	Rima Fakih
11	70 (244)	Ashley, BJ, Courtney, Jessica, and Jameria are made into potential homecoming queens.	December 22, 2011	Full Episode	Lisa Reynolds
11	71 (245)	Julia is made into a hardcore metal vocalist.	January 23, 2012	Full Episode	Alissa White-Gluz
11	72 (246)	Mary Beth is made into a hip hop dancer.	January 18, 2012	Full Episode	Shakira Marshall
11	73 (247)	Elizabeth, Daniella, Vanity, Rachel, Lauren, Tyler, Mikey, Felix, Austin, and Jacob are made into homecoming king and queens.	January 19, 2012	Full Episode	Angelea Preston
11	74 (248)	Jamie is made into a girly girl	January 23, 2012	Full Episode	Nikki Veal
11	75 (249)	Jason is made into a rocker.	January 25, 2012	Full Episode	Eoin Harrington
11	76 (250)	Laura is made into a modern dancer.	January 26, 2012	Full Episode	Eve Mason
11	77 (251)	The Clay High School basketball team is made into a kick ass team.	February 2, 2012	Full Episode	Jaclyn Vocell
11	78 (252)	Meghan is made into a singer.	February 3, 2012 Final episode.	Full Episode	Maya Azucena
11	79 (253)	Sarah is made into a pageant queen.	February 1, 2012	Full Episode	Brenna Heater
11	80 (254)	Alyssa is made into a hockey player.	January 31, 2012	Full Episode	Chris Kawano

=== Season 12 ===
Season	Episode	Episode Summary	Premier date	External Link	Coach
12	1 (255)	Josh is made into a ladies' man.	May 5, 2012	Full Episode	Travis Brown
12	2 (256)	Kenneth is made into a basketball player.	May 5, 2012	Full Episode	Quran "Storm" Pender
12	3 (257)	Elizabeth is made into a softball player.	May 5, 2012	Full Episode	Kelley Montalvo
12	4 (258)	Mary is made into an actress.	May 5, 2012	Full Episode	Mercedes Scelba-Shorte
12	5 (259)	Nicholas is made into a singer.	June 4, 2012	Full Episode	Brian Angel
12	6 (260)	Arly is made into a cheerleader.	June 5, 2012	Full Episode	Jason Graham
12	7 (261)	Ben is made into the perfect boyfriend.	June 6, 2012	Full Episode	Bobbi Jo Kitchen
12	8 (262)	Ainsley is made into a prom queen.	June 11, 2012	Full Episode	Maggie Brown
12	9 (263)	Mackenzie is made into a cheerleader.	June 13, 2012	Full Episode	Jenny Stever
12	10 (264)	Sammy is made into a ladies' man.	June 14, 2012	Full Episode	Samantha Carrie Johnson
12	11 (265)	Abby is made into a rapper.	June 15, 2012	Full Episode	Torae
12	12 (266)	Derek is made into a boxer.	January 5, 2013	Full Episode	Rick Coward
12	13 (267)	Emily is made into a more outgoing person.	January 5, 2013	Full Episode	Angela Lutin
12	14 (268)	Brooke is made into a fitness model.	January 5, 2013	Full Episode	Tianna Ta
12	15 (269)	Rob is made into a comedian.	January 5, 2013	Full Episode	Dan Ahdoot
12	16 (270)	Lexi, Megan, Melissa, and Kaitlin are made into tough mudders.	January 5, 2013	Full Episode	Nancy & Brian Young
12	17 (271)	Chinesa is made into a salsa dancer.	January 5, 2013	Full Episode	Desiree Godsell
12	18 (272)	Katie is made into a stunt woman.	April 1, 2013	Full Episode	Deven Macnair
12	19 (273)	Justin is made into a singer.	April 3, 2013	Full Episode	Donnie Klang
12	20 (274)	Courtney, Jade, Kellie, and Megan are made into entrepreneurs on Catalina Island.	April 4, 2013	Full Episode	Robert Croak
12	21 (275)	Alyssa is made into a fashion stylist.	April 5, 2013	Full Episode	Sarah Ellison Lewis

=== Season 13 (#DreamBigger) ===
Season	Episode	Episode Summary	Premier date	External Link	Coach
13	1 (276)	Cara is made into an actress.	June 18, 2012	Full Episode	Nikki DeLoach
13	2 (277)	Felicia is made into a rapper	June 19, 2012	Full Episode	Killer Mike|-|
13	3 (278)	Rachel is made into a makeup mogul.	June 20, 2012	Full Episode	Nikki Robinson
13	4 (279)	Megan is made into a model.	June 22, 2012	Full Episode	Whitney Thompson
13	5 (280)	Rita is made into an actress.	June 25, 2012	Full Episode	Amanda Seales
13	6 (281)	Aly is made into a roller derby girl.	June 25, 2012	Full Episode	Tracy "Disco" Akers
13	7 (282)	Dana is made into having her own show.	June 26, 2012	Full Episode	Lashan Browning
13	8 (283)	Amber is made into a recording artist.	June 29, 2012	Full Episode	Abesi Manyando
13	9 (284)	Chris is made into a celebrity assistant.	October 9, 2012	Full Episode	BJ Coleman
13	10 (285)	Shane is made into a tough mudder.	October 10, 2012	Full Episode	Chris
13	11 (286)	Shambre is made into a gogo Dancer.	October 11, 2012	Full Episode	Katie Kansas
13	12 (287)	Richard is made into a drag queen.	October 12, 2012	Full Episode	Manila Luzon
13	13 (288)	Ashley is made into a circus performer.	October 15, 2012	Full Episode	Rebecca Star
13	14 (289)	Emilly and Jeanette are made into actresses.	October 17, 2012	Full Episode	Brian Patacca
13	15 (290)	Maeve is made into a pageant queen.	November 3, 2012	Full Episode	Gina Cerilli, Elena LaQuatra
13	16 (291)	Deanna is made into a professional wrestler.	November 10, 2012	Full Episode	Lisa Marie "Tara" Varon

=== Season 14 ===
Season	Episode	Episode Summary	Premier date	External Link	Coach
14	1 (292)	Jordan is made into a pageant queen.	October 5, 2013	Full Episode	Ana Rodriguez
14	2 (293)	Katie is made into a singer.	October 5, 2013	Full Episode	Iliana Incandela
14	3 (294)	Yessenia and the Southwest High School Cheer Team are made into a competitive squad.	October 5, 2013	Full Episode	Matt Parkey
14	4 (295)	Mandy is made into a cheerleader.	October 5, 2013	Full Episode	Jalina Porter

=== Season 15 ===
Season	Episode	Episode Summary	Premier date	External Link	Coach
15	1 (296)	Luis Reyes is made into a fashion mogul.	September 13, 2014	Full Episode	Indashio
15	2 (297)	Alex is made into model material by losing weight.	September 13, 2014	Full Episode	Samantha Carrie Johnson
15	3 (298)	Sarah is made into a prom queen.	September 9, 2014	Full Episode	Julie Robenhymer
15	3 (299)	Arianna and her dance team are made into a superior squad.	October 1, 2014		
15	4 (300)	Autumn is made into a pageant queen.	October 8, 2014		
15	5 (301)	Cleburne High School Dance Team	October 14, 2014		
15	6 (302)	Savasia is made into a pageant queen.	November 11, 2014		
15	7 (303)	Comedy actresses.	November 19, 2014		
