= Listen (Emanuel and the Fear album) =

Studio album by Emanuel and the Fear
- Released: March 9, 2010
- Genre: Symphonic rock
- Label: Paper Garden
- Producer: Jamin Gilbert for Ishlab Music

Emanuel and the Fear chronology
Emanuel and the Fear (EP) (2009)	Listen (2010)	Hands (2011)

Listen is the first full-length album from Brooklyn-based symphonic rock band Emanuel and the Fear and was released via Paper Garden in March 2010.

== Critical reception ==
Regarding Emanuel and the Fear's first full-length record, The 405 wrote: "The haunting mish-mash of psychedelia, poetic lyrics, pop and post-rock is tremendously put together and while a little overblown at times, it never gets in the way of the clarity of any song. Mixing The National's sentimentality with the integrity of Eels, a dedicated cult following already awaits."

== Track listing ==
1. The Introduction 02:12
2. Guatemala 03:38
3. Ariel and the River 05:25
4. Jimme's Song (Full Band Version) 05:24
5. Duckies 00:16
6. Free Life 03:52
7. Dear Friend 04:18
8. Yo, Jamin 00:31
9. Trucker Lovesong 05:40
10. Balcony 06:44
11. Whatever You Do 04:08
12. Bridges and Ladies 00:16
13. The Raimin 05:13
14. Same Way 03:32
15. Simple Eyes 04:03
16. Song For a Girl 03:34
17. The Finale 05:47
18. Look Ma, The Walls Are Moving 00:23
19. Razzmatazz 03:49
