= Farewell Flight =

Rock band from Harrisburg, Pennsylvania

- Origin: Harrisburg, Pennsylvania
- Genres: Rock, indie rock, pop rock
- Years active: 2003–2015
- Label: Mono Vs Stereo
- Members: Luke Foley; Brian "Rabbit" Campbell; Caleb Allensworth; Joshua St. Moblo; touring members: Chase Gregory; Salar Rajabnik; David Deaton
- Past members: Brian Miller; Robbe Reddinger; Marc Prokopchak; Tim Moslener; Joel Semke; Josiah Stoltzfus; Nathan Horst

Farewell Flight is an American rock band that was formed in Harrisburg, Pennsylvania in 2003 by singer songwriter Luke Foley. Currently based in Nashville, TN, Foley is joined by lead guitarist Brian "Rabbit" Campbell, drummer Caleb Allensworth, and bassist Joshua St. Moblo.

The band's music has developed over the course of its existence, beginning as an indie pop piano-driven band with folk leanings to its current grunge pop with new wave sound. More recently, the band's songs have been featured in a national TV advertisement for CITGO as well as on the CW Network show, Hart of Dixie (S03E04). After featuring the band as Artist of the Week in August 2014, Nashville tastemaker alternative station Lightning 100 began to regularly spin the single "Scarecrow". Having charted on AAA format, "Scarecrow" also joins several prior singles in receiving regular airplay on Philadelphia's WXPN. Alternative Press magazine named Farewell Flight as an "Artist You Need To Know in 2015".

== Formative Years: 2003–2006 ==
Foley and singer songwriter Nathan Horst formed the group in 2003, along with previous members bassist Joel Semke and drummer Josiah Stoltzfus. After 2 years and the release of two EPs (a self-titled debut and Signals), Stoltzfus and Semke departed in 2005 for educational pursuits, and were replaced by drummer Marc Prokopchak and bassist Robbe Reddinger. Horst stayed on for several months, but later left to focus on producing and engineering at his Harrisburg, PA-based Attic Studios. After several months and 2 tours of writing and performing music as a three-piece, the band brought on guitarist Timmy Moslener in May 2006. The band went on to write and release 2 EPs within a year, and successfully completed several independent national tours.

== MVS Signing and Sound.Color.Motion: 2007–2008 ==
By 2007, Farewell Flight had caught the ear of Brad Moist, head of A&R at independent label Mono Vs Stereo, who signed the band to record a full-length album. The band quickly hit the studio, recording with Grammy Award winning producer Mitch Dane. The project, called Sound.Color.Motion. was mixed and engineered by Grammy Award winner Vance Powell. Though production of Sound.Color.Motion. was begun by Mono Vs Stereo, the label was put on hiatus before the album's release. Independent once again, on August 19, 2008, Farewell Flight released Sound.Color.Motion. on their own label The Easy Company, distributing it through online retailers, at their live shows, and in 2010 freely through NoiseTrade. In October 2008, after the release of Sound.Color.Motion. guitarist Timmy Moslener departed the band to pursue a counseling career outside of music. Not long after Moslener's departure the band enlisted Brian "Rabbit" Campbell, a childhood friend of Reddinger, to become their new lead guitarist.

== Touring and Lonesome Traveler: 2009–2010 ==
Newly independent, the band continued their aggressive touring, later completing 29 national tours by 2012. The band's DIY approach to booking, marketing, merchandising, and tour-management, as well as the use of van converted to run on vegetable oil, allowed them to continue playing extensively at minimal expenses, forgoing any salaries and saving all profits to put towards a new record. After falling short of raising their desired recording budget, in 2009 the band autonomously conceived and successfully executed the idea to crowdfund their new album with a pre-order via PayPal. On September 14, 2009, the band began work on a new album, Lonesome Traveler, once again enlisting the services of producer Mitch Dane and mixing engineer Vance Powell. After completion of recording, Foley was approached by Matthew Thiessen and Matthew Hoopes of rock band Relient K. Having revived Mono Vs Stereo and now directing A&R, the two expressed a desire to re-sign the band, and repackage and re-release Sound. Color. Motion. The band agreed to the venture, and with the exception of 3 songs to be including in the repackaging, Lonesome Traveler was shelved at the behest of MVS.

== Reunion with MVS and Out For Blood: 2011 ==
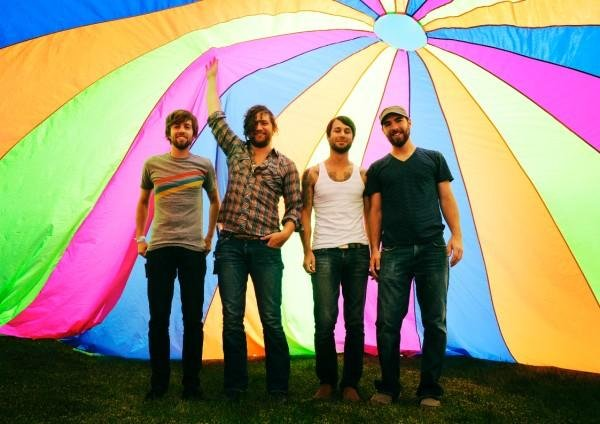
Farewell Flight in 2011

On May 11, 2011, Mono Vs Stereo announced on their website that they had once again signed Farewell Flight. With Matthew Thiessen and Matthew Hoopes of Relient K directing A&R, the label also announced plans to release the album Out for Blood on July 12, 2011, followed by a late-summer tour. Following the announcement of the new album, Farewell Flight released the title track of Out For Blood as their first single on Mono Vs Stereo. In a video posted on the band's YouTube page, Thiessen and Hoopes explained that they had urged a band moniker change to Indian Summer, feeling that Farewell Flight sounded too much like the names of some other bands. After an outcry of negative responses from fans to a post announcing the change on AbsolutePunk.net, the label decided to revert the band's name back to Farewell Flight, calling the decision to change their name a blunder and thanking the fans for their input. On June 1, 2011, MVS released a lyric video of Out For Blood to the band's YouTube page, followed by a music video on July 4, 2011.

== Nashville Relocation and I Was a Ghost: 2012–2014 ==
In March 2012, the band announced the resignation of bassist Robbe Reddinger and drummer Marc Prokopchak, as well as the addition of bassist Brian Miller (formerly of the Evan Anthem) and drummer Caleb Allensworth (formerly of the Mint). According to a blog posted by the band, Reddinger's and Prokopchak's exit was due to a respective desire to pursue other interests and was on favorable terms. The band made a decision to cut back on independent touring, focus on songwriting, and relocated to Nashville, TN in June 2012. In December 2012, the band announced its second departure from MVS, and as well as plans to record new music independently. By early 2013, plans were in motion for a new album, I Was a Ghost, to be crowdfunded by Kickstarter. Fans of the band successfully funded the project on May 19, 2013, contributing $11,938. Recording began with producer St. Wilson at Legion of Boom in Nashville on June 17 and commenced on August 9, 2013. On October 23, 2013, a lyric video for The Places You'll Go was posted to the band's YouTube page. In December 2013, the band published the departure of bassist Brian Miller, enlisting the help of various friends to fill the slot for the rest of 2014. On March 4, 2014, the band released I Was a Ghost, featuring the lead single "Scarecrow". Bassist Joshua St. Moblo was first seen playing live with the band in June 2014, and was later added as a permanent bassist in October 2014.

== Sweet Dreams Norma Jean and hiatus: 2015–present ==
On November 20, 2015, Farewell Flight independently released the single "Sweet Dreams Norma Jean", which remains the band's most recent release. Around 2016, frontman Luke Foley began releasing solo material under the stage name "Lukr", starting with the single "Fucked Up Summer", which surpassed one million streams on Spotify within twelve weeks. That August, Foley also released a re-recorded version of "Scarecrow" as a Lukr single, on August 12, 2016; the remake featured different production from the 2014 original and replaced its wordless vocal bridge with a newly written chorus. Asked on the band's Facebook page whether Farewell Flight had ended, the band replied that its members had "graduated to focusing on other projects", without confirming a formal breakup. Foley continued to record and perform as Lukr, and in May 2020 appeared as a contestant on NBC's Songland, pitching a song to country duo Florida Georgia Line; producers reworked the track with him on-air, though it was not ultimately selected. As of 2025, Lukr continues to release music independently. No new material or performances have been documented under the Farewell Flight name since 2015, and the activities of the band's other former members since that time are not publicly documented.

== Discography ==
=== Albums ===
- Sound.Color.Motion. (August 19, 2008)
- Out for Blood (July 12, 2011)
- I Was a Ghost (March 4, 2014)

=== EPs ===
- Signals (late 2005)
- Northern (January 20, 2006)
- Lost at Sea (October 13, 2006)
- Deas Vail/Farewell Flight Split (June 7, 2011)
