= Shinobi Ninja =

American rock band

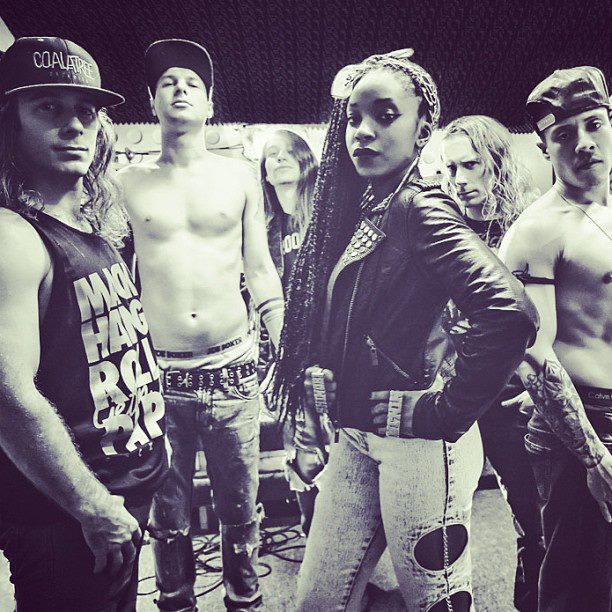

Background information
- Origin: Brooklyn, New York
- Genres: Rock; hip hop; heavy metal; reggae
- Years active: 2008–present
- Members: Baby G; Alien Lex; Kid Shreddi; Axis Powers; Terminator Dave; Doobie Duke Sims
- Past members: Jonny on the Rocks
- Website: www.shinobininja.com

YouTube information
- Channel: Shinobi Ninja
- Years active: 2008–present
- Genre: Music
- Subscribers: 104 thousand
- Views: 3.43 million
- Last updated: August 20, 2026

Shinobi Ninja is an American rock and hip hop band from Brooklyn, New York. Formed in 2008, the band blends elements of rock, hip hop, heavy metal, punk rock, reggae, funk, and electronic music. The band has toured throughout the United States and has been featured by outlets including Billboard, EBONY, Spin, MTV, and Fuse TV.

== Origins ==
Prior to joining the band, Baby G (Edara Johnson) was a professional dancer for Rihanna, P Diddy, Daddy Yankee, Jason Derulo, Ricky Martin and others. BK Reader later reported that Johnson had also worked professionally with Cassie before joining the band, while EBONY described her as the band's female lead vocalist and noted her previous work performing professionally with Rihanna, Diddy and Santigold. Johnson also appeared in the music video for Cassie's 2006 single "Long Way 2 Go".

Meanwhile, Axis, Mike, and Dave were in a band called Wax Machine, which broke up in early 2008. Shinobi Ninja formed shortly afterward. Several members of the band met at a rehearsal and recording studio called Progressive Music in the Film Center Building in the Hell's Kitchen neighborhood of Manhattan. Doobie Duke Sims, Jonny, and Mike worked at the studio, while Baby G took vocal classes there. In 2010, original bass player Jonny left the band and was replaced by Alien Lex.

Of the six members of the band, only Doobie Duke Sims and Alien Lex are originally from Brooklyn, having both been raised in Bensonhurst. Lead vocalist Baby G is from Lawrence, Massachusetts. Twin brothers Kid Shreddi (Mike) and Terminator Dave are from Piermont, New York. Axis Powers is originally from Toronto, Ontario, Canada. Jarobi White of A Tribe Called Quest has performed with the band on numerous occasions and has been referred to by the group as its "official unofficial" seventh member.

Outside of the band, Doobie founded the Brooklyn streetwear brand Snow Milk in 2022.

== Career ==
On January 28, 2010, the band released Shinobi Ninja Attacks!, a Nintendo-style video game album for iPhone, iPod, and iPad. According to Hypebot, Shinobi Ninja was the first independent band to release an application based on its likeness and music.

On October 6, 2010, lead vocalist Baby G appeared as the featured coach on MTV Made, season 11, episode 11.

The band released its debut studio album, Rock Hood, in April 2011. The music video for "Rock Hood" was later added to regular rotation on MTVU during the band's national touring.

The band's song "Stop" was featured in the third episode ("El Diablo") of the American television drama series The Killing, which aired on April 10, 2011 on AMC.

"Rock Hood" was featured in the video games NBA 2K12 and Tap Tap Revenge 3.

In 2012, Billboard featured Shinobi Ninja's cover of Boyz II Men's "Water Runs Dry" as part of its Mashup Mondays series.

The song "Amped to 12" was written specifically for the 2014 comedy film A Haunted House 2.

The band released the double album Escape from New York / Return From... in June 2014.

In 2015, EBONY profiled Shinobi Ninja, highlighting the band's blend of hip hop, punk and rock while discussing lead vocalist Baby G's transition from professional dancer to musician.

In March 2017, Shinobi Ninja released its third studio album, Bless Up.

In 2017, Spike Lee featured the band's song "Genuine" in his Netflix series She's Gotta Have It.

Also in 2017, Corey Taylor of Slipknot and Stone Sour played the band's songs "What If Times" and "Saw Red" on episodes of his Apple Music program A Series of Bleeps.

That same year, Billboard featured lead vocalist Baby G in its Soul Sisters series, discussing her role as the band's frontwoman and career in music.

The band's fluorescent pink and blue logo sticker has appeared in productions including 60 Minutes, Avengers: Infinity War, Uncut Gems, Catfight, Hip-Hop Evolution, and Generation Iron 2.

As of 2026, the band has released more than 50 music videos and two visual albums: Escape From New York and Bless Up.

== Members ==
- Edara aka Baby G – vocals
- Terminator Dave – drums
- Doobie Duke Sims – vocals, guitar
- Alien Lex – bass guitar (2010–present)
- DJ Axis Powers – turntables, backing vocals
- Kid Shreddi aka Maniak Mike – guitar, backing vocals

Former members

- Jonathan Nunes Simone, aka Jonny on the Rocks – bass guitar (2008–2010)

== Discography ==
=== Studio albums ===
- Rock Hood (2011)
- Escape from New York / Return From... (2014, Double Album)
- Bless Up (2017)

=== EPs ===
- Brooklyn to Babylon (2009)
- The Video Game EP (2010)
- LiL Bud B-Sides (2011)
- The Chronicles of DAB & Friends (2014)
- Artistic Visions (2015)

=== Mixtapes ===
- Blunts & Nunchucks (2010)
- The Chronicles of Hashy Larry (2011)

=== Non-album singles ===
- "ILL ISH" (2012)
- "Rusty Stab" (2012)
- "I'm the One" (2013)
- "The Sounds of Calizona" (2013)
- "Acid Man" (2014)
- "MeUWe" featuring Dinco D (Leaders of the New School) (2014)
- "FunBang" maxi single (2016)
- "Monks in the Moshpit" featuring Wordspit the Illest (2016)
- "K.U.N.T" produced by DJ Jawa (2016)

=== Live albums ===
- Live at the Bitter End (7/4/09)
- Live at Converse Rubber Tracks (11/11/11)

=== Van album ===
- The Monster Van Album (2014)
