= Atomic Tom =

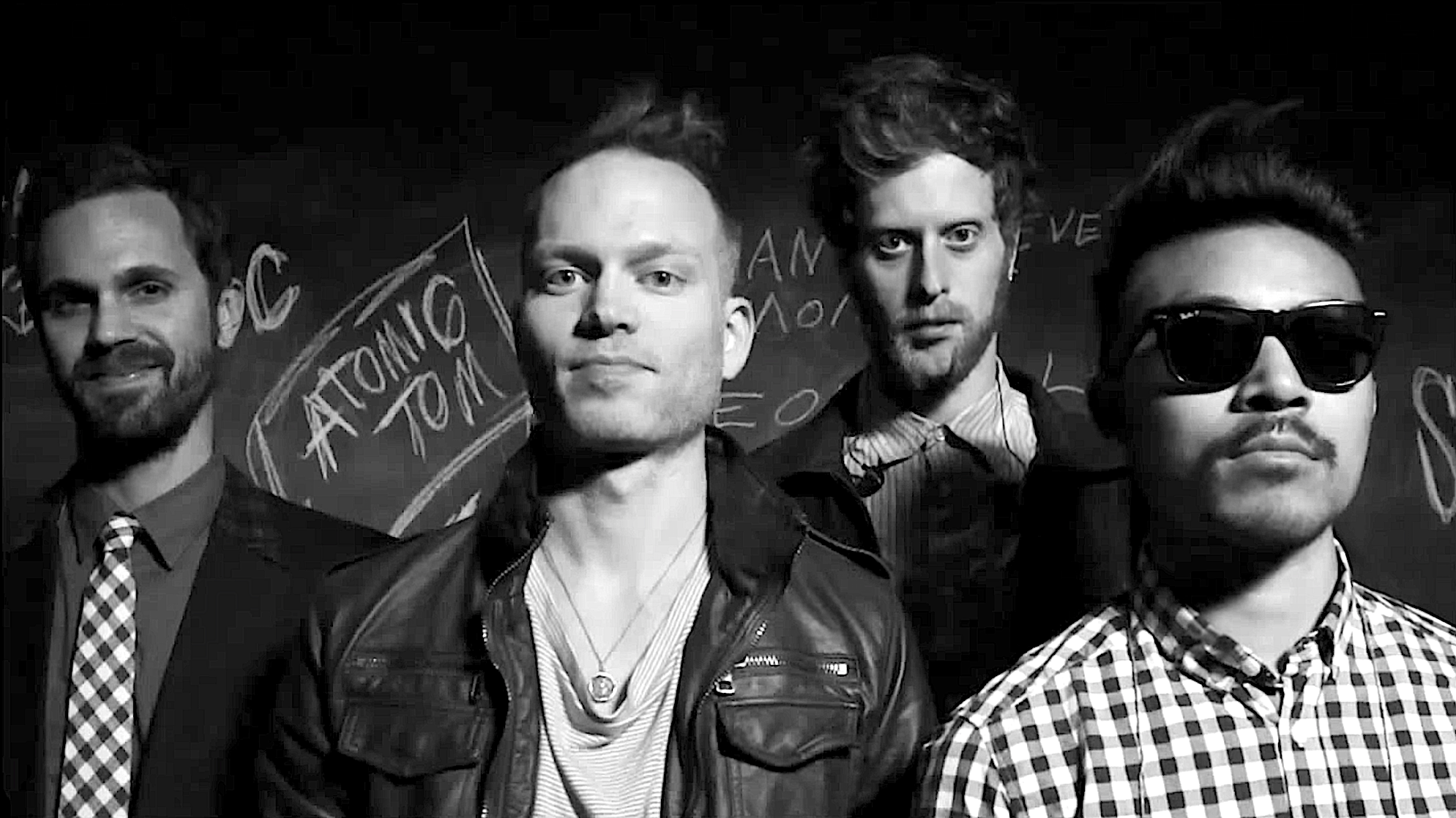
- Ethan Mentzer, Luke White, Tobias Smith, Eric Espiritu

Background information
- Origin: Brooklyn, New York, United States
- Genres: Alternative rock Indie rock
- Label: Universal Republic
- Members: Luke White; Eric Espiritu; Ethan Mentzer; Tobias Smith
- Past members: Philip Galitzine
- Website: https://www.atomictom.com

Atomic Tom is an alternative rock band originally from Brooklyn, New York, consisting of Luke White (lead vocals), Eric Espiritu (guitar, background vocals), Ethan Mentzer (bass, background vocals), and Tobias Smith (drums, background vocals). The band have released three albums, two EPs and a number of singles.

== History ==
In 2005 the original band released its debut EP called “Anthems for the Disillusioned,” which contained five songs. In 2007 they released the single, “You Always Get What You Want” b/w “Play That Dirty Girl.”

In January 2010 the band signed to Universal Republic Records. Their first album The Moment debuted on July 27, 2010. The physical copy became available in stores in November 2010.

The band gained popularity in October 2010 after they performed their single "Take Me Out" on four iPhones on the New York City subway B train. The fictional premise of the video was that the band's instruments had been stolen, forcing them to improvise with their iPhones. In January 2011, "Take Me Out" reached #22 on the Bubbling Under Hot 100 chart.

On October 28, 2010, the band made their national television debut, appearing on Jimmy Kimmel Live! performing "Take Me Out." The performance included a hybrid performance of both iPhones and real instruments. The band continued the national TV circuit, performing and interviewing on CBS' "The Early Show," "Rachael Ray Show," "E! News," "A Different Spin with Mark Hoppus," and "Lopez Tonight."

On May 17, 2011, the band released a music video for “Red Light Warning Sign,” which was featured on Mashable. The video contains a controversial Facebook theme. In February 2011 the band recorded a cover of The Human League's "Don't You Want Me" for the 80's nostalgia film "Take Me Home Tonight," the music video of which featured members of the movie cast.

On September 13, 2011, Atomic Tom released an EP titled "In Parallel" featuring their new single, "Break My Heart Around You."

Atomic Tom has toured the US and Canada, sharing the stage with Ok Go, Broken Bells, Neon Trees, Ra Ra Riot, Awolnation, Manchester Orchestra, Grace Potter and the Nocturnals, Lupe Fiasco, Guster, and The Bravery.

In the fall of 2011, Atomic Tom supported Switchfoot and Anberlin on their US co-headline tour.

On October 25, 2011, Atomic Tom released a music video for their song, "Break My Heart Around You". The video chronicles the journey of a man with a paper bag over his head as he looks for love in New York City.

In late 2011, the band parted ways with record label Universal Republic.

On December 12, 2011, Atomic Tom released a cover of Wham!'s "Last Christmas." The new recording was made available as a free download on their official Facebook page. A music video for the holiday single was released December 27, 2011.

In March 2012, Atomic Tom performed on Rockboat, "the world's greatest floating music festival." Rockboat XII sailed from New Orleans to Cozumel, Mexico and back.

In Fall of 2012, Atomic Tom went back into the studio to begin pre-production on their follow up to "The Moment".

In early 2013, the band moved to Los Angeles and began playing a few shows around the LA area to test out new material.

On June 25, 2013, the band released a cover of "Everybody Wants To Rule The World" by Tears for Fears, their first studio recording since 2011's "Last Christmas".

During the month of July 2013, Atomic Tom began releasing live acoustic versions of new songs, including "Someone To Love", "1978" & "Touch". These songs were filmed and recorded live at their LA home studio, "The Alamo" and were offered as a free download for fans.

On July 30, 2013, Atomic Tom released their new single "Music Makes The Heart Grow Stronger" from their forthcoming record on iTunes along with a brand new lyric video for the song.

On December 18, 2013, Atomic Tom released a video of their cover of Mariah Carey's "All I Want for Christmas is You" on YouTube with a free download on SoundCloud.

In 2014, Atomic Tom recorded songs for their second full-length album 'ERA', which the band released independently on September 11, 2015. The full-length album featured their singles "Someone To Love", "Music Makes the Heart Grow Stronger" and "1978".

In 2019, Atomic Tom began writing for their third full-length record and recording the new songs between 2021 and 2023. The band released four new singles from the unreleased album in 2024, including "Let Me Show You How It's Done", "Heroes", "Drive Away" and "Wake Me When I'm Gone".

On July 25, 2025, Atomic Tom independently released their third full-length album 'The Way It Never Was'. The album featured twelve original songs all written, produced, mixed and mastered by the band in the Princeton, NJ studio. The single "Wake Up The Night" accompanied the release of the album.

== Members ==
- Luke White - lead vocals, guitar
- Eric Espiritu - guitar, background vocals
- Ethan Mentzer - bass, background vocals
- Toby "The Red Apple" Smith - drums, background vocals

== Discography ==
=== Studio albums ===
- The Moment (2010)
- ERA (2015)
- The Way It Never Was (2025)

=== Extended plays ===
- Anthems for the Disillusioned (2005)
- In Parallel (2011)

=== Singles ===
- "You Always Get What You Want" (2007)
- "Take Me Out" (2010)
- "Don't You Want Me" (2011)
- "Red Light Warning Sign" (2011)
- "Break My Heart Around You" (2011)
- "Last Christmas" (2011)
- "Music Makes The Heart Grow Stronger" (2013)
- "1978" (2014)
- "Someone To Love" (2016)
- "Burn The Witch" (2017)
- "Comeback" (2018)
- "Time After Time" (2019)
- "Let Me Show You How It's Done" (2024)
- "Heroes" (2024)
- "Drive Away" (2024)
- "Wake Me When I'm Gone" (2024)
- "Human" (2025)
- "Wake Up The Night" (2025)
