= Indashio =

American fashion designer

Brad Michael Batory (born January 16, 1984), known professionally as Indashio, is a fashion designer, TV personality, entrepreneur, humanitarian, and stylist.

== History ==
Indashio launched his line in South Beach, Miami at Funksion on March 23, 2003, at the age of 19. Later that year Indashio became the youngest designer to Show at New York Fashion Week, alongside Esteban Cortázar. WWD featured his first collection in September 2003 for the debut of Spring/Summer 2004 Collections. Indashio clothes became a staple for MTV and BET VJs, worn by Amerie on BET's The center, Lala Vasquez on MTV Direct Effect, and Free from BET's 106 and PARK.

In October 2004 Indashio granted his first wish—of many—for the Make-A-Wish Foundation at his Los Angeles Fashion Week show at The Mondrian Hotel in West Hollywood. The show was attended by Randy Jackson and Tachina Arnold. Having already styled for the magazine, Indashio became the New York fashion director for Lucire in 2005, producing editorials and celebrity covers. He did cover shoots with Vanessa Carlton, Stacy J, Brittney Gastineau, and Nicky Hilton and working with noted photographers like Richard Reinsdorf, Nigel Barker, David Roemer, Jon Moe, Yan Dandois, Jeffrey Gamble, and Kai Regan.

Indashio continued to showcase his collections at New York Fashion Week and in Miami, as well as in his hometown of Pittsfield, Massachusetts, in 2006. He appeared on an episode of the MTV series "8th and Ocean," and styled Theodora Richards for Lucire that year. He made national headlines in 2007 after a $10,000 dress he designed was stolen after a show at Casa Casaurina, the former Versace mansion. WWD. In June of that year he appeared on the NBC morning show "NBC Daytime" and did a show in Tampa, Florida, at the historic Centro Asturiano in Ybor. He styled Kim Kardashian that summer for a photo shoot with George Kamper at Vizcaya Museum and Gardens. Indashio and his New York Fashion Week show appeared on MTV's Made series in November of that year. In 2008 Indashio presented his collection to sold-out shows in Honolulu, Hawaii and Jamaica and appeared on the cover of Midweek; at 23, he was being called "America's Hottest Designer." Later that year he starred in VH1 Glam God and was the $100,000 grand prize winner.

Fresh off his Glam God win, Indashio went on tour in 2009 with his collection, showing in Atlanta, Dallas, St. Louis, Chicago, New York, Miami and Antigua. His New York Fashion Week show that season was DJed by DJ Skribble and celebrities attending included Teyana Taylor, Pussycat Doll Melody Thornton, and Ice-T & Coco. In 2010, Indashio "Super Sweet 26" birthday party in Times Square was sponsored by Dave and Buster's; and the designer was contracted to create T-shirts for the chain. That February, his fall "Red Carpet Collection" received mixed reviews at New York Fashion Week, and in the spring Indashio went apartment hunting on HGTV's "Selling New York" series. In September he premiered his "PARTY MONSTER" Collection, which was inspired by the movie and featured Amber Rose. Ron Artest was in the front row along with Janice Combs, Angelina Pivarnick, Shontelle and Kat De Luna. In March, Indashio made his mark on Fashion Week Tokyo, showcasing his Jetset Collection. The show was attended by Japanese pop star AI and featured on FOX TV Japan and WWD Japan. Indashio also showcased at Islands of The World Fashion Week in Nassau, Bahamas and at Cayman Fashion Solstice, hosted by Selita Ebanks. The designer partnered with SpaBerry to launch a line of Indashio designer hot tubs that is sold at Lowe's, including one called PennyBerry. In 2011 the designer drew sponsor attention from Trident Gum, for New York Fashion Week where Indashio designed 3 dresses inspired by Trident's new flavors. Stormi Henley, Denise Richards and Adrienne Bailon wore the dresses to the show and generated over 65 million media impressions including coverage in Access Hollywood, Elle, Wall Street Journal, the New York Post, OK! Magazine to name a few. Johnny Weir and Aubrey O'Day opened and closed the Fall 2012 show at New York Fashion Week. Indashio showcased at AXDW Athens Exclusive Designer week making his European debut in March, 2011 he also made his debut in Africa at Gaborone Fashion Nite in April 2011. Many celebrities continue to support Indashio and his line and he continues to make his mark worldwide.

During the third annual Fashion's Night Out on September 8, Famous Footwear hosted a model casting call at its midtown Manhattan store, on 34th St. near Seventh Avenue. Special guests Indashio, and America's Next Top Model winner CariDee English managed the event, during which each model showed his or her runway walk in the center of the store. The individual selected during the casting call event earned a coveted spot on the runway during Indashio's September 13 New York Fashion Week show, sporting looks from his spring 2012 collection. CariDee English, Johnny Weir, Plaxico Burress, Matt Barnes walked in his fashion show that season. NY1 News also covered the event calling Indashio "One of the youngest designers of our generation". QuestLove DJ'ed his after party at Griffin which was attended by Kourtney Kardashian and filmed for Season 2 of "Kim & Kourtney Take New York" on E!

In February 2012 Indashio launched "Fall in Love" collection at New York Fashion Week for Fall/Winter 2012 and held an after party at Greenhouse which was attended by NFL player James Dockery, Tyrese Gibson and Rocsi Diaz and DJ Clue DJ'ed. The Love collection was featured at Republica Dominicana Fashion Week in Santiago and Style Week Jamaica in Kingston. Indashio filmed 6 episodes of "Design Genius" for the FashionOne network that spring. Indashio served as the host and executive producer for the reality competition series, searching for fashion's next protégé. In summer 2012 while filming an episode of MTV's MADE launched The F.A.M.E. Festival at Eastover Resort in Lenox, MA and also showcased at St. Charles Fashion Week in St. Charles, Missouri and received a proclamation from the Mayor. That September, during New York Fashion Week SEXY HAIR sponsored the designer's "American Dream" collection debut and was inspired by President Barack Obama . "Indashio Black" a nail paint by Evolution Man launched that year as a product for men and became a trending topic on Twitter when Dwyane Wade tweeted a photo of his pedicure which inspired BET VJ Terrence J to paint his nails on air for an episode of 106 & Park.

In January 2013, Indashio celebrated his birthday in Toronto and Canadian premier with singer Vita Chamber at the Gladstone Hotel. In February, Indashio collaborated with designer Ava Michelle of Who's Cares NYC and staged a gorilla style fashion show in New York City's Grand Central Terminal during Fashion Week in February for the launch of his "Wish Upon A Star" collection for Fall/Winter 2013/14. Celebrities Lorna Luft NFL player James Anderson and MOB Wives Ramona Rizzo paraded in support of the designer. In March 2013 the television series "Design Genius" hosted by Indashio premiered on The Fashion One Network. Indashio's American Dream Collection showcased at Cayman Island Fashion Week that year. In September 2013 Indashio celebrated 10 years at New York Fashion Week with an event at EVR and featured a "POP" inspired T-shirt collection with longtime muse CariDee English and electric violinist Sarah Charness and featured inspiration by his favorite artists Lauryn Hill, Tupac, Lil' Kim, Bob Marley as well as make-up inspired by Roy Lichtenstein. Indashio is the youngest designer to have shown at New York Fashion Week consecutively for a decade since the age of 19. Later that month Indashio traveled to Curaçao as a tourism ambassador and showcased his collection during their first gay Pride event.

In 2014 the designer's "Warrior" collection premiered at Alaska Fashion Week on June 1 and expressed in an interview to the Anchorage Press his battle with depression and the inspiration behind his collection. Indashio and model Sessilee Lopez filmed the event for his new untitled TV series in a local CBS interview. In September 2014 Indashio was a coach for MTV's MADE series for a fashion mogul episode.
