= Sound.Color.Motion. =

Studio album by Farewell Flight
- Released: August 19, 2008
- Recorded: 2007 at Sputnik Sound Nashville, Tennessee
- Genres: Rock; Indie; Pop
- Length: 43:00
- Label: The Easy Company
- Producer: Mitch Dane

Farewell Flight chronology
Sound.Color.Motion. (2008)	Out For Blood (2011)

Professional ratings
Review scores
Source	Rating
AbsolutePunk.net	(86%)
Punk News	3/5 stars

Sound.Color.Motion. is the debut album of the American rock band Farewell Flight, released in 2008. Recording of the album was commissioned through Mono Vs Stereo though the label folded before its intended release date. The band decided to move forward with the album's release independently, under their label The Easy Company.

== Track listing ==
All tracks are written by Luke Foley & Farewell Flight.

No.	Title	Length
1.	"A Lullaby For Insomniacs"	2:35
2.	"Widower"	3:54
3.	"Over"	5:18
4.	"Indianapolis"	3:33
5.	"Phones"	4:16
6.	"Sailor's Mouth"	5:36
7.	"Begin Again"	3:20
8.	"America Will Break Your Heart"	3:33
9.	"Cruel"	3:41
10.	"The Usual Vernacular"	3:34
11.	"Slow"	3:40

== Personnel ==
- Luke Foley - Piano, Guitar, Vocals
- Marc Prokopchak - Drums
- Timmy Moslener - Guitar
- Robbe Reddinger - Bass guitar
- Mitch Dane - Producer
- Vance Powell - Engineer
