= Deaths in February 2012 =

The following is a list of notable deaths in February 2012.

Entries for each day are listed alphabetically by surname. A typical entry lists information in the following sequence:

- Name, age, country of citizenship and reason for notability, established cause of death, reference (and language of reference, if not English).

== February 2012 ==
=== 1 ===
- Herb Adams, 83, American baseball player (Chicago White Sox).
- Gerlando Alberti, 84, Italian Sicilian Mafioso, cancer.
- Gerhard Bosse, 90, German violinist and conductor.
- Robert B. Cohen, 86, American businessman, founder of Hudson News, progressive supranuclear palsy.
- Herb Conn, 91, American climbing and caving pioneer.
- Don Cornelius, 75, American television host and producer (Soul Train), suicide by gunshot.
- Andrij Dobriansky, 81, Ukrainian-born American opera singer, diabetes and heart disease.
- Angelo Dundee, 90, American boxing trainer (Muhammad Ali).
- Joe Ekins, 88, British World War II soldier.
- Fabián Estapé, 88, Spanish economist.
- Jannatul Ferdous, 74, Bangladeshi teacher and politician.
- André Génovès, 70, French film producer and director.
- Tony Giorgio, 88, Italian-American actor and magician, heart failure.
- Sara González Gómez, 62 or 64, Cuban singer.
- John Harrison, 87, Australian Olympic rower.
- Ruth Hausmeister, 99, German actress (Zwei Brüder, The Longest Day).
- Ladislav Kuna, 64, Slovak football player and manager.
- Robert Lawless, 74, American anthropologist.
- Ardath Mayhar, 81, American author.
- Ingolf Mork, 64, Norwegian Olympic ski jumper.
- David Peaston, 54, American R&B singer, complications of diabetes.
- Lutz Philipp, 71, German Olympic athlete.
- Gilbert Poirot, 67, French Olympic ski jumper.
- Charlie Spoonhour, 72, American basketball coach (Southwest Missouri State, Saint Louis University), complications from lung disease.
- Jerry Steiner, 94, American basketball player (Fort Wayne Pistons).
- Andrzej Sztolf, 70, Polish Olympic ski jumper.
- Wisława Szymborska, 88, Polish poet, Nobel Prize in Literature (1996).

=== 2 ===
- Paramjit Bahia, 61, Indian-born Canadian field hockey player.
- Joyce Barkhouse, 98, Canadian children's writer (Pit Pony), heart attack.
- Daphne Brooker, 84, British model, costume designer, and professor, bronchopneumonia.
- Paul Consbruch, 81, German Roman Catholic prelate, Auxiliary Bishop of Paderborn (1980–1999).
- Frederick William Danker, 91, American lexicographer and New Testament scholar.
- Marcel Douzima, 85, Central African teacher and politician.
- David Edelsten, 78, British writer and army officer.
- George Esper, 79, American journalist and foreign correspondent (Associated Press).
- Elwyn Friedrich, 78, Swiss Olympic ice hockey player, myocardial infarction.
- Luis Javier Garrido, 71, Mexican political analyst.
- Dorothy Gilman, 88, American spy novelist (The Unexpected Mrs. Pollifax), complications of Alzheimer's disease.
- Jorge Glusberg, 79, Argentine author and curator, director of the Museo Nacional de Bellas Artes.
- John Houlder, 95, British engineer.
- Nassib Lahoud, 67, Lebanese politician.
- James F. Lloyd, 89, American politician, U.S. Representative from California (1975–1981), stroke.
- Asko Mäkilä, 67, Finnish footballer

=== 3 ===
- Steve Appleton, 51, American businessman (Micron Technology), plane crash.
- Christopher Asir, 64, Indian bishop, cancer.
- John Christopher, 89, British science fiction author (The Tripods, The Sword of the Spirits).
- HIM Damsyik, 82, Indonesian dancer and actor.
- Francis Patrick Donovan, 90, Australian academic, lawyer, and diplomat.
- Ben Gazzara, 81, American actor (Anatomy of a Murder, The Big Lebowski, Road House), pancreatic cancer.
- Terence Hildner, 49, American general, commander of the 13th Sustainment Command (Expeditionary).
- Raj Kanwar, 50, Indian film director and producer, kidney failure.
- Karibasavaiah, 52, Indian film actor.
- Zalman King, 70, American film director (Wild Orchid) and producer (9½ Weeks), cancer.
- Karlo Maquinto, 21, Filipino boxer.
- Mart Port, 90, Estonian architect.
- Jacob Salatun, 84, Indonesian ufologist.
- Andrzej Szczeklik, 73, Polish physician and educational administrator (Jagiellonian University Medical College).
- Toh Chin Chye, 90, Singaporean politician, Deputy Prime Minister (1965–1968) and Minister for Health (1975–1981).
- Wilhelm Wachtmeister, 88, Swedish diplomat, Ambassador to the United States (1974–1989).
- Norton Zinder, 83, American microbiologist, pneumonia.

=== 4 ===
- István Csurka, 77, Hungarian playwright and politician, Chairman of the Hungarian Justice and Life Party (since 1993).
- Robert Daniel, 75, American politician, U.S. Representative from Virginia (1973–1983).
- Mike deGruy, 60, American documentary filmmaker (Trials of Life, The Blue Planet), helicopter crash.
- Václav Dosbaba, 67, Czech painter.
- Nigel Doughty, 54, British businessman, owner (since 1999) and chairman (2001–2011) of Nottingham Forest F.C.
- George Duncan, 75, Scottish footballer.
- Soledad Duterte, 95, Filipino teacher and activist.
- Joseph W. Estabrook, 67, American Roman Catholic prelate, Auxiliary Bishop of the Military Services (since 2004) and Titular Bishop of Flenucleta.
- Harry F. Franke Jr., 89, American politician.
- Robert Glaser, 91, American cognitive psychologist, complications from Alzheimer's disease.
- Florence Green, 110, British supercentenarian, last surviving veteran of World War I.
- Fernando Lanhas, 88, Portuguese painter.
- Hubert Leitgeb, 46, Italian Olympic biathlete, two-time world champion, avalanche.
- Irene McKinney, 72, American poet, Poet Laureate of West Virginia (since 1994), cancer.
- Livio Minelli, 85, Italian former European welterweight champion boxer.
- Wendell Mitchell, 71, American politician, Alabama State Senator (1974–2010), heart failure.
- Nicolás Moreno, 88, Mexican landscape painter.
- Jeffrey Perry, 63, British stage and screen actor (The Chronicles of Narnia).
- Sir Alan Reay, 86, British Army officer, Director General Army Medical Services (1981–1984).
- Pierre-Eugène Rouanet, 94, French-born Ivorian Roman Catholic prelate, Bishop of Daloa (1956–1975).
- János Sebestyén, 80, Hungarian organist.
- Giovanni Volta, 83, Italian Roman Catholic prelate, Bishop of Pavia (1986–2003).
- Andrew Wight, 51, Australian screenwriter and producer (Sanctum), helicopter crash.
- Pongphan Wongsuwan, 61, Thai football manager (TOT S.C.).

=== 5 ===
- José Luis Álvarez, 94, Guatemalan artist.
- Violeta Autumn, 81, Peruvian-born American architect and artist.
- Blaine, 74, Canadian editorial cartoonist.
- Royal Cathcart, 85, American football player.
- Colin Churchett, 86, Australian footballer.
- Sam Coppola, 79, American actor (Saturday Night Fever, Fatal Attraction, Ryan's Hope).
- Jazmín De Grazia, 27, Argentine model and television presenter, cocaine overdose.
- Al De Lory, 82, American record producer.
- Lady Ganga, 45, American humanitarian, cervical cancer.
- Jef Gilson, 85, French musician.
- Bill Hinzman, 75, American actor (Night of the Living Dead), cancer.
- Ray Honeyford, 77, English headmaster and writer.
- William D. Houser, 90, American vice admiral (World War II, Korea, Vietnam), Alzheimer's disease and pneumonia.
- Jiang Ying, 92, Chinese opera singer and music teacher.
- Lidiya Rasulova, 70, Azerbaijani politician, member of Supreme Soviet, Minister of Social Security (1988–1991) and of Education (1993–1997).
- Peter Kerim, 57, Ugandan military officer.
- Phil Shanahan, 84, Irish hurler.
- John Turner Sargent Sr., 87, American publisher.
- Lawrence Zhang Wen-Chang, 92, Chinese Roman Catholic priest, Apostolic Administrator of Kunming, Dali, and Zhaotong (since 2000).
- Jo Zwaan, 89, Dutch Olympic athlete.

=== 6 ===
- Abdus Sattar Akon, 82–83, Bangladeshi teacher and politician, result of illness.
- Billy Bean, 78, American jazz guitarist.
- Jean Bingen, 91, Belgian papyrologist and epigrapher.
- Peter Breck, 82, American actor (The Big Valley).
- Roger Chesneau, 86, French steeplechaser.
- Sharada Dwivedi, 69, Indian historian.
- Yasuhiro Ishimoto, 90, Japanese photographer, complications following pneumonia and a stroke.
- Noel Kelehan, 76, Irish musician (RTÉ Concert Orchestra).
- Jim King, 69, British musician (Family).
- Jay Lambert, 86, American Olympic boxer.
- Juan Vicente Lezcano, 74, Paraguayan footballer.
- Matthew Mbu, 82, Nigerian politician and diplomat, Foreign Minister (1993).
- Władysław Ogrodziński, 93, Polish historian and writer.
- Erik Reitzel, 70, Danish civil engineer.
- Bob Roesner, 85, American baseball umpire.
- David Rosenhan, 82, American psychologist.
- Norma Merrick Sklarek, 85, American architect, heart failure.
- Antoni Tàpies, 88, Spanish painter.
- István Udvardi, 51, Hungarian Olympic bronze medal-winning (1980) water polo player.
- Janice E. Voss, 55, American astronaut, breast cancer.
- David A. Winter, 81, Canadian academic.

=== 7 ===
- Sam Aluko, 82, Nigerian economist and scholar.
- Leonard E. Andera, 77, American politician.
- James Baring, 6th Baron Revelstoke, 73, British aristocrat.
- Knox Chamblin, 76, American pastor and professor.
- Maria Chessa Lai, 89, Italian poet.
- Danny Clyburn, 37, American baseball player (Baltimore Orioles, Tampa Bay Devil Rays), shot.
- Patricia Stephens Due, 72, American civil rights activist, cancer.
- Ann Dummett, 81, British activist.
- Devy Erlih, 83, French violinist.
- Peter Goddard, 80, New Zealand educationalist.
- Marie-Louise Haumont, 93, Belgian writer.
- Florence Holway, 96, American advocate for rape victims.
- Harry Keough, 84, American soccer player and coach.
- Sergio Larraín, 81, Chilean photographer.
- Robert Maxwell, 90, American songwriter and harpist.

=== 8 ===
- Shane Atwell, 41, Barbadian sailor.
- Bill Benson, 91, Canadian ice hockey player.
- Theophilus Brown, 92, American painter.
- Phil Bruns, 80, American actor (Mary Hartman, Mary Hartman, Barney Miller, The Great Waldo Pepper).
- Dennis Callahan, 70, American politician, Mayor of Annapolis (1985–1989), heart attack.
- Giancarlo Cecconi, 76, Italian sports shooter.
- Robert Christie, 69, English cricketer.
- John Cunningham, 72, Irish journalist, editor of Connacht Tribune (1984–2007), illness.
- Alain Danilet, 64, French politician.
- Laurent Desjardins, 88, Canadian politician.
- Jacques Duchesne-Guillemin, 101, French philologist.
- John Fairfax, 74, British ocean rower and adventurer.
- Giangiacomo Guelfi, 87, Italian opera singer.
- Robert E. Hecht, 92, American antiquities dealer.
- Lew Hitch, 82, American basketball player (Minneapolis Lakers, Milwaukee Hawks, Philadelphia Warriors).
- Jorge Salvador Lara, 85, Ecuadorian historian and politician, Minister of Foreign Affairs (1966, 1976–1977).
- Franca Maï, 52, French actress, cancer.
- Laurie Main, 89, Australian-born character actor (Welcome to Pooh Corner).
- Enrique Moreno, 48, Spanish footballer.
- Al Moroney, 70, Irish rugby union player (national team).
- Gunther Plaut, 99, German-born Canadian rabbi and author.
- Jimmy Sabater, 75, American Latin musician.
- Allan Segal, 70, British documentary maker, cancer.
- Luis Alberto Spinetta, 62, Argentine musician (Almendra, Pescado Rabioso, Invisible), lung cancer.
- Irina Turova, 76, Soviet sprinter.
- Wando, 66, Brazilian singer, cardiorespiratory arrest.
- Brayim Younisi, 85, Iranian Kurdish writer, novelist and translator.

=== 9 ===
- Adam Adamowicz, 43, American video game concept artist (The Elder Scrolls V: Skyrim, Fallout 3), cancer.
- Robert Baker, 85, American ice hockey player.
- Jill Kinmont Boothe, 75, American alpine skier.
- Peggy Crowe, 56, American Olympic speed skater.
- Susarla Dakshinamurthi, 90, Indian film music director, playback singer, and record producer.
- Fred Dickson, 74, Canadian lawyer and politician, Senator (since 2009), colon cancer.
- O. P. Dutta, 90, Indian film director, complications of pneumonia.
- Josh Gifford, 70, British racehorse jockey and trainer, heart attack.
- John Hick, 90, English philosopher and theologian.
- Barbara Marianowska, 64, British-born Polish politician.
- Joe Moretti, 73, British guitarist, lung cancer.
- Oscar Núñez, 83, Argentine actor (Good Life Delivery), cancer.
- Don Panciera, 84, American football player (New York Yankees, Detroit Lions, Chicago Cardinals).

=== 10 ===
- Ibrahim Al-Faqi, 61, Egyptian-born Canadian neuro-linguistic programming expert, home fire.
- Chuck Baird, 64, American artist.
- Geoffrey Cornish, 97, American golf course architect.
- R. T. France, 73, British New Testament scholar.
- Ronald Fraser, 81, English historian.
- John Gage, 73, British art historian.
- Joseph Gaggero, 84, Gibraltarian businessman.
- Filippo Giannini, 88, Italian Roman Catholic prelate, Auxiliary Bishop of Rome (1980–1998).
- Ed Harrison, 84, Canadian ice hockey player (New York Rangers, Boston Bruins).
- Francisco de Guruceaga Iturriza, 84, Venezuelan Roman Catholic prelate, Bishop of La Guaira (1973–2001).
- Brian Jones, 67, British intelligence analyst.
- Andrey Korotkov, 57, Russian politician, after long illness.
- Lloyd Morrison, 54, New Zealand businessman (Infratil), leukemia.
- Wilmot Perkins, 80, Jamaican radio personality.
- David Anthony Pizzuto, 60, Canadian-born American voice actor (Family Guy, Call of Duty: Modern Warfare 3).
- Ivan Pravilov, 48, Ukrainian ice hockey coach, suicide by hanging.
- Refuse To Bend, 11, Irish Thoroughbred racehorse, winner of the National Stakes (2002) and 2,000 Guineas Stakes (2003), myocardial infarction.
- James Riordan, 75, English novelist and academic.
- Adolfo Schwelm Cruz, 88, Argentine racing driver.
- Jeffrey Zaslow, 53, American author and columnist, car accident.

=== 11 ===
- Siri Bjerke, 53, Norwegian politician, Minister of the Environment (2000–2001), cancer.
- Volodymyr Borysovsky, 78, Ukrainian builder, electrical engineer, and politician.
- David Craven, 60, American art historian.
- Gene Crumling, 89, American baseball player (St. Louis Cardinals).
- Aharon Davidi, 85, Israeli general.
- Guido Fanti, 86, Italian politician.
- Trent Frayne, 93, Canadian sportswriter.
- Whitney Houston, 48, American singer ("I Will Always Love You") and actress (The Bodyguard), accidental drowning.
- John Sperry, 87, Canadian Anglican Bishop of the Arctic (1974–1990).

=== 12 ===
- Galal Amer, 59, Egyptian journalist, heart attack.
- Zina Bethune, 66, American actress (Sunrise at Campobello), hit-and-run.
- Nicanor de Guzman Jr., 80, Filipino politician, lingering liver and pancreatic illness.
- Malcolm Devitt, 75, English footballer.
- Denis Flannery, 83, Australian rugby league player.
- Adrian Foley, 8th Baron Foley, 88, British musician and aristocrat.
- David Kelly, 82, Irish actor (Fawlty Towers, Strumpet City, Charlie and the Chocolate Factory).
- Gratia Schimmelpenninck van der Oye, 99, Dutch Olympic alpine skier (1936).
- John Severin, 90, American comic book artist (Hulk, Sgt. Fury and his Howling Commandos), co-founder of Mad magazine.
- David A. Walker, 83, British scientist.
- Howard Zimmerman, 85, American professor of chemistry.

=== 13 ===
- Wendy Albano, 52, American businesswoman, strangled.
- Russell Arms, 92, American singer (Your Hit Parade) and actor (The Man Who Came to Dinner).
- Lillian Bassman, 94, American photographer.
- Ladislau Biernaski, 74, Brazilian Roman Catholic prelate, Bishop of São José dos Pinhais (since 2006), cancer.
- Frank Braña, 77, Spanish film actor, respiratory failure.
- Al Brenner, 64, American football player (New York Giants, Hamilton Tiger-Cats).
- Jodie Christian, 80, American jazz pianist.
- Louise Cochrane, 93, American-born British television producer.
- Trevor Davey, 85, New Zealand politician.
- Eamonn Deacy, 53, Irish footballer, member of Aston Villa championship-winning team (1981), heart attack.
- Sophie Desmarets, 89, French actress.
- Humayun Faridi, 59, Bangladeshi actor.
- Maria Fischer-Slyzh, 89, Ukrainian-Canadian pediatrician and philanthropist.
- Daniel C. Gerould, 84, American playwright and academic.
- David Griffiths, 84, British Anglican clergyman, Archdeacon of Berkshire (1987–1992).
- Kushimaumi Keita, 46, Japanese sumo wrestler and coach (Tagonoura), ischaemic heart disease.
- Anwar Kamal Khan, 64, Pakistani politician, cardiac failure.
- Akhlaq Mohammed Khan, 75, Indian poet, lyricist and academic, lung cancer.
- Isaak B. Klejman, 91, Ukrainian Soviet archaeologist.
- Mohamed Lamari, 72, Algerian lieutenant general, Chief of Staff of the People's National Army (1993–2004), heart attack.
- Víctor Manuel Liceaga Ruibal, 77, Mexican politician, Governor of Baja California Sur (1987–1993), respiratory failure.
- Severo Lombardoni, 62, Italian music producer.
- Jim O'Brien, 64, Scottish film and television director (The Young Indiana Jones Chronicles).
- Leta Peer, 47, Swiss painter and fine art photographer.
- Sansón, 87, Spanish football player.
- Freddie Solomon, 59, American football player (Miami Dolphins, San Francisco 49ers), colon and liver cancer.
- Edward Groesbeck Voss, 82, American botanist and lepidopterist.

=== 14 ===
- V. S. Acharya, 71, Indian politician.
- Mike Bernardo, 42, South African boxer, kickboxer and martial artist.
- Antonio Campos Alum, 92, Paraguayan politician.
- Desmond Carroll, 93, English archdeacon.
- Zlatko Crnković, 76, Croatian actor, cardiac arrest.
- Ibragimkhalil Daudov, 51, Russian militant leader of the Vilayat Dagestan, shot.
- Erwin Fiedor, 68, Polish Olympic ski jumper.
- Reinhold Frosch, 76, Austrian luger.
- Gloria Gallardo, 73, American activist.
- Kim Pong-chol, 69, North Korean politician, helicopter crash.
- Tonmi Lillman, 38, Finnish musician (Ajattara, Sinergy, To/Die/For, Lordi).
- Earl Lindley, 78, American football player (Edmonton Eskimos).
- Tom McAnearney, 79, Scottish footballer (Sheffield Wednesday, Peterborough United, Aldershot).
- Dory Previn, 86, American singer-songwriter (Mythical Kings and Iguanas) and lyricist (Valley of the Dolls, Last Tango in Paris).
- Péter Rusorán, 71, Hungarian water polo player and coach, Olympic champion.
- Art Tait, 83, American football player.
- Alfredo Vega, 77, Paraguayan footballer.

=== 15 ===
- Tariq al-Dahab, 34–38, Yemeni terrorist, shot.
- Charles Anthony, 82, American tenor, kidney failure.
- Ray Bailey, 76, Australian politician, President of the Tasmanian Legislative Council (1997–2002).
- Sir Alan Cottrell, 92, British metallurgist and physicist.
- Shannon D. Cramer, 90, American admiral.
- William H. Dabney, 77, American military officer, awarded Navy Cross.
- Cyril Domb, 91, British physicist.
- Jacques Duby, 89, French actor.
- Joki Freund, 85, German jazz saxophonist.
- Zelda Kaplan, 95, American socialite and philanthropist.
- Doug McNichol, 81, Canadian football player (Montreal Alouettes, Toronto Argonauts).
- Bibudhendra Mishra, 83, Indian politician.
- Lina Romay, 57, Spanish actress, cancer.
- Clive Shakespeare, 62, British-born Australian guitarist (Sherbet) and record producer, prostate cancer.
- James Whitaker, 71, British journalist, royal editor of the Daily Mirror, cancer.
- Gerrit Ybema, 66, Dutch politician, State Secretary for Economic Affairs (1998–2002), lung cancer.
- John J. Yeosock, 74, American lieutenant general, lung cancer.

=== 16 ===
- Duško Antunović, 65, Croatian Olympic water polo player and coach.
- Gösta Arvidsson, 86, Swedish Olympic athlete.
- Chikage Awashima, 87, Japanese actress (Takarazuka Revue), pancreatic cancer.
- Mitja Brodar, 91, Slovenian archaeologist.
- Tiko Campbell, 64, American author and architect.
- Gary Carter, 57, American Hall of Fame baseball player (Montreal Expos, New York Mets), brain tumor.
- Shlomo Cohen-Tzidon, 89, Israeli politician.
- Donald Henry Colless, 89, Australian entomologist.
- Israel B. Curtis, 79, American politician.
- René Debenne, 97, French cyclist.
- Sir Baddeley Devesi, 70, Solomon Islander politician, first Governor-General (1978–1988).
- Jacques Forest, 91, French carcinologist.
- Warren Hudson, 49, Canadian football player (Toronto Argonauts, Winnipeg Blue Bombers), brain cancer.
- Elyse Knox, 94, American actress and model, mother of Mark Harmon.
- Joy Lamason, 96, New Zealand cricketer.
- Reidar T. Larsen, 88, Norwegian politician, member of parliament (1973–1977).
- John Macionis, 95, American Olympic silver medal-winning (1936) swimmer.
- Kathryn McGee, 91, American disability rights advocate.
- Harry McPherson, 82, American lawyer and lobbyist, advisor to Lyndon B. Johnson, cancer.
- Geevarghese Osthathios, 93, Indian Orthodox bishop, Senior Metropolitan of the Malankara Orthodox Syrian Church.
- Anil Ramdas, 54, Surinamese-born Dutch columnist and journalist (NRC Handelsblad).
- Ronald Rindestu, 69, Norwegian politician.
- John Ritchie, 67, English footballer.
- Anthony Shadid, 43, American journalist, asthma.
- Ethel Stark, 101, Canadian violinist and conductor.
- Gene Vance, 88, American basketball player (Chicago Stags, Tri-Cities Blackhawks, Milwaukee Hawks).
- Dick Anthony Williams, 77, American actor (Edward Scissorhands, The Jerk, Homefront), after long illness.

=== 17 ===
- Rodolfo Acevedo, 60, Chilean historian.
- Nicolaas Govert de Bruijn, 93, Dutch mathematician.
- Robert Carr, Baron Carr of Hadley, 95, British politician, MP for Mitcham (1950–1974) & Carshalton (1974–1976); Home Secretary (1972–1974).
- Clarence Dart, 91, American World War II fighter pilot (Tuskegee Airmen).
- Michael Davis, 68, American bassist (MC5), liver failure.
- Winkie Direko, 82, South African politician, Premier of the Free State (1999–2004), stroke.
- Pierre Francisse, 87, Belgian Olympic fencer.
- Danny Halloran, 57, Australian footballer (Carlton).
- Jordan, 79, Brazilian footballer (Flamengo), diabetes.
- Kurt Lehovec, 93, American physicist.
- Ulric Neisser, 83, American psychologist.
- Hank Nelson, 74, Australian historian, cancer.
- Peter Novick, 77, American historian.
- Howie Nunn, 76, American baseball player (St. Louis Cardinals, Cincinnati Reds).
- Frank Sanders, 62, American Olympic silver medal-winning (1972) ice hockey player, pancreatic cancer.

=== 18 ===
- Roald Aas, 83, Norwegian Olympic gold (1960) and bronze (1952) medal-winning speed skater.
- Alex Anisi, Papua New Guinean politician.
- Mariam Behruzi, 66–67, Iranian lawyer.
- József Breznay, 95, Hungarian painter.
- George Brizan, 69, Grenadian politician, Prime Minister (1995), diabetes.
- João Viegas Carrascalão, 65, East Timorese politician.
- Zvezdan Čebinac, 72, Serbian football player and manager.
- Elizabeth Connell, 65, South African soprano, cancer.
- Clementina Díaz y de Ovando, 96, Mexican writer and academic.
- Linda Estrella, 89, Fillipina actress.
- M. R. D. Foot, 92, English military historian.
- Ken Goodwin, 78, English comedian (The Comedians), Alzheimer's disease.
- Peter Halliday, 87, Welsh actor (Doctor Who, The Remains of the Day).
- Miles Jackson-Lipkin, 87, British barrister, Hong Kong High Court judge (1981–1987), social welfare fraudster.
- María Amalia Lacroze de Fortabat, 90, Argentine business executive and philanthropist.
- Matt Lamb, 79, American painter.
- Bertie Messitt, 81, Irish Olympic athlete (1960).
- Roger Miner, 77, American senior federal appellate judge, heart failure.
- Cal Murphy, 79, Canadian football coach and general manager (Winnipeg Blue Bombers).
- Peter Sharp, 72, New Zealand first class cricketer (Canterbury) and cricket commentator, cancer.
- Ric Waite, 78, American cinematographer (Red Dawn, Footloose, 48 Hrs.).
- Mohammed Wardi, 79, Sudanese singer and songwriter, kidney complications.

=== 19 ===
- Hubert Braun, 72, German Olympic bobsledder.
- Georgi Cherkelov, 81, Bulgarian actor, stroke.
- Robin Corbett, Baron Corbett of Castle Vale, 78, British politician, MP for Hemel Hempstead (1974–1979) and Birmingham Erdington (1983–2001), cancer.
- Renato Dulbecco, 97, Italian-born American virologist, Nobel laureate in Physiology or Medicine (1975).
- Avraham Fahn, 95, Israeli professor.
- Vito Giacalone, 88, American mobster.
- Eric Harris, 56, American football player (Toronto Argonauts, Kansas City Chiefs, Los Angeles Rams), heart attack.
- J. Paul Hogan, 92, American research chemist.
- Steve Kordek, 100, American pinball machine designer.
- Giovanni Lilliu, 97, Italian archeologist.
- Ruth Barcan Marcus, 90, American philosopher and logician.
- Walter Schloss, 95, American investor and stock trader, leukemia.
- Dick Smith, 72, American baseball player (Los Angeles Dodgers, New York Mets).
- So Man-sul, 84, North Korean Zainichi activist, Chongryon Central Standing Committee chairman.
- Frits Staal, 81, Dutch philosopher.
- Stanislovas Stonkus, 80, Lithuanian basketball player.
- Herman G. Tillman Jr., 89, American pilot (World War II, Korea, Vietnam), liver failure.
- Jaroslav Velinský, 79, Czech science fiction and detective author.
- Vitaly Vorotnikov, 86, Soviet politician, Chairman of the Presidium of the Supreme Soviet of the Russian SFSR (1988–1990).

=== 20 ===
- Foyez Ahmad, 84, Bangladeshi journalist, writer and cultural activist.
- Clive Baker, 77, English footballer (Halifax Town).
- Raymond Cicci, 82, French footballer
- Knut Torbjørn Eggen, 51, Norwegian Olympic football player and coach.
- Asar Eppel, 77, Russian translator, stroke.
- Johnny Ezersky, 89, American basketball player.
- Ra Ganapati, 76, Indian writer.
- Sebhat Gebre-Egziabher, 76, Ethiopian author.
- Imanuel Geiss, 81, German historian.
- Marcel Gerdil, 84, French sprinter.
- Katie Hall, 73, American politician, U.S. Representative from Indiana (1982–1985).
- S. N. Lakshmi, 85, Indian actress, cardiac arrest.
- Lydia Lamaison, 97, Argentine actress (Muñeca Brava).
- Christoffer Schander, 51, Norwegian marine biologist.
- Ariyil Shukoor, 24, Indian student, stabbed.
- Michael Siegal, 61, British developmental psychologist.
- Adrienne Smith, 78, Australian sport administrator.
- John Steer, 83, British art historian.
- Edgardo Gabriel Storni, 75, Argentine Roman Catholic prelate, Archbishop of Santa Fe de la Vera Cruz (1984–2002).
- Tamanna Begum, 64, Pakistani actress.
- Sullivan Walker, 68, Trinidadian actor (The Cosby Show, Get Rich or Die Tryin'), heart attack.

=== 21 ===
- Ranil Abeynaike, 57, Sri Lankan cricketer and commentator, heart attack.
- James Blackett-Ord, 90, British judge and churchman.
- Ajahn Chanda Thawaro, 90, Thai Buddhist monk.
- Sarbari Roy Choudhury, 79, Indian sculptor, heart attack.
- H. M. Darmstandler, 89, American Air Force officer.
- Herman Fialkov, 89, American entrepreneur, venture capitalist, and philanthropist.
- Manuel Franco da Costa de Oliveira Falcão, 89, Portuguese Roman Catholic prelate, Bishop of Beja (1980–1999).
- Emlyn Hooson, Baron Hooson, 86, British politician, MP for Montgomeryshire (1962–1979).
- Colin Ireland, 57, British serial killer.
- Pierre Juneau, 89, Canadian broadcasting executive and cabinet minister, Minister of Communications (1975), namesake of the Juno Awards.
- Fay Kleinman, 99, American painter, complications of a broken hip.
- Vera Kublanovskaya, 91, Russian mathematician.
- Yusuf Kurçenli, 65, Turkish film director, cancer.
- Tom Martinez, 66, American football coach, heart attack.
- John Michuki, 79, Kenyan politician, heart attack.
- Gladys O'Connor, 108, British-born Canadian actress (Billy Madison, Fly Away Home, The Long Kiss Goodnight).
- Benjamin Romualdez, 81, Filipino politician and diplomat, Governor of Leyte (1967–1986), brother of Imelda Marcos, cancer.
- Leonard Rosoman, 98, British artist.
- Barney Rosset, 89, American publisher (Grove Press) and free speech advocate.
- Eldor Urazbayev, 71, Russian film director.
- Stanisław Wieśniak, 81, Polish Olympic rower.
- John Charles Winter, 88, British church organist.

=== 22 ===
- Ali Abolhassani, 56, Iranian spiritual historiograph, heart failure.
- Syed Mohammad Izhar Ashraf, 78, Indian imam.
- Frank Carson, 85, Northern Irish comedian.
- Marie Colvin, 56, American reporter (The Sunday Times), shelling.
- Nakamura Jakuemon IV, 91, Japanese kabuki actor, pneumonia.
- Lyudmila Kasatkina, 86, Russian actress, People's Artist of the USSR.
- Thabang Lebese, 38, South African footballer, AIDS-related illness.
- Lorin Levee, 61, American clarinetist (Los Angeles Philharmonic).
- João Mansur, 88, Brazilian politician, Governor of Paraná (1973).
- Robert R. McElroy, 84, American photographer.
- Mike Melvoin, 74, American jazz pianist and composer, cancer.
- Dmitri Nabokov, 77, American opera singer and translator.
- Rémi Ochlik, 28, French photographer, shelling.
- Royal Academy, 25, Irish Thoroughbred racehorse, winner of the Breeders' Cup Mile (1990).
- Haycene Ryan, 60, Montserratian cricketer, cancer.
- Ian Robertson, 89, British rear admiral.
- Cuauhtémoc Sandoval Ramírez, 61, Mexican politician, heart attack.
- Enzo Sellerio, 88, Italian photographer, heart attack.
- Billy Strange, 81, American songwriter ("Limbo Rock") and music arranger.
- Sukhbir, 86, Indian writer.

=== 23 ===
- Tasoltan Basiev, 64, Soviet and Russian engineer.
- Dick Bernard, 94, Scottish lawn bowler.
- Cathy Campbell, 49, New Zealand broadcaster, brain tumour.
- Howard Campbell, 90, Scottish rugby union player.
- Charlie Collins, 66, Canadian football player, car accident.
- Anne Commire, 72, American playwright.
- William Gay, 70, American author.
- Peter King, 47, English footballer (Crewe Alexandra, Southport).
- Grigory Kosykh, 79, Soviet sports shooter.
- Mariuccia Medici, 102, Swiss-born Italian actress.
- William Raggio, 85, American politician, Nevada State Senator (1972–2011), respiratory illness.
- David Sayre, 87, American scientist.
- Marc Soula, 66, French entomologist.
- Bruce Surtees, 74, American cinematographer (Lenny, Dirty Harry, Beverly Hills Cop).
- Jan van Borssum Buisman, 92, Dutch painter.
- Kazimierz Żygulski, 92, Polish sociologist and politician.

=== 24 ===
- Infanta Maria Adelaide of Portugal, 100, Portuguese royal.
- Tony Aiello, 90, American football player.
- Agnes Allen, 81, American baseball player (All-American Girls Professional Baseball League).
- István Anhalt, 92, Hungarian-born Canadian composer.
- Bob Badgley, 83, American jazz double-bassist.
- Jan Berenstain, 88, American writer and illustrator (Berenstain Bears), stroke.
- Des Cohen, 84, South African swimmer.
- Benedict Freedman, 92, American novelist and mathematician.
- Njenga Karume, 82, Kenyan businessman and politician, cancer.
- Theodore Mann, 87, American theatre producer and director.
- Terry Mathews, 47, American baseball player (Texas Rangers, Florida Marlins, Baltimore Orioles), heart attack.
- Kenneth Price, 77, American ceramics artist, cancer.
- Pery Ribeiro, 74, Brazilian singer, myocardial infarction.
- Eliana Tranchesi, 56, Brazilian chief executive (Daslu).
- Jay Ward, 73, American baseball player (Minnesota Twins, Cincinnati Reds).
- Oliver Wrong, 87, British medical academic.

=== 25 ===
- Gloria Alcorta, 96, Argentine writer, poet and sculptor.
- Maurice André, 78, French classical trumpeter.
- Dave Cheadle, 60, American baseball player (Atlanta Braves).
- Lynn Compton, 90, American soldier, inspiration for Band of Brothers, heart attack.
- Dick Davies, 76, American gold medal-winning Olympic basketball player (1964).
- Alan Detweiler, 85, Canadian composer, author, and patron of the arts.
- Lloyd R. George, 85, American politician, member of the Arkansas House of Representatives (1963–1967; 1973–1997).
- Red Holloway, 84, American jazz saxophonist, stroke and kidney failure.
- Erland Josephson, 88, Swedish actor and author, leader of the Royal Dramatic Theatre in Stockholm, complications of Parkinson's disease.
- Louisiana Red, 79, American blues musician, stroke.

=== 26 ===
- Ed Brigadier, 62, American actor (Pushing Daisies, Gilmore Girls, The Jane Austen Book Club).
- Phyllis Simmons Brooks, 85, Canadian educator.
- Richard Carpenter, 82, English television screenwriter.
- Robinson Cavalcanti, 67, Brazilian Anglican bishop, stabbed.
- Paddy Concannon, 93, Irish politician.
- Árpád Fekete, 90, Hungarian football player and coach.
- Mohamed Fourati, 80, Tunisian surgeon.
- Georg Holzherr, 85, Swiss Roman Catholic prelate, Abbot Ordinary of Territorial Abbacy of Maria Einsiedeln (1969–2001).
- Don Joyce, 82, American football player (Baltimore Colts, Chicago Cardinals, Minnesota Vikings).
- Hans Christian Korting, 59, German dermatologist.
- Kumar Kashyap Mahasthavir, 85, Nepalese Buddhist monk.
- Trayvon Martin, 17, American teenager, shot.
- Berto Poosen, 67, Belgian Olympic volleyball player.
- George E. Terwilleger, 71, American politician.
- Johannes Vågsnes, 88, Norwegian politician.
- Yvonne Verbeeck, 98, Belgian actress.
- Zollie Volchok, 95, American basketball executive.

=== 27 ===
- Ely Bielutin, 86, Russian artist.
- Louis Bertorelle, 79, French Olympic basketball player.
- David Bowman, 54, American writer, cerebral hemorrhage.
- Rich Brenner, 65, American sports commentator.
- Pedro Azabache Bustamante, 94, Peruvian painter.
- Vince Dantona, 62, American ventriloquist.
- Werner Guballa, 67, German Roman Catholic prelate, Auxiliary Bishop of Mainz (since 2003).
- Ma Jiyuan, 91, Chinese military leader.
- Sailen Manna, 87, Indian Olympic footballer.
- Piotr Pawłowski, 86, Polish actor.
- Armand Penverne, 85, French football player.
- Tina Strobos, 91, Dutch psychiatrist and humanitarian, protected Jewish refugees during World War II, cancer.
- Władysław Tajner, 76, Polish Olympic ski jumper.
- Helga Vlahović, 67, Croatian journalist, producer and television personality, uterine cancer.

=== 28 ===
- Karl Arnold, 71, German weightlifter.
- Frisner Augustin, 63, Haitian Vodou drummer.
- Bai Jing, 28, Chinese actress, stabbed.
- Anna Lou Dehavenon, 85, American anthropologist.
- Terri Dial, 62, American banker, pancreatic cancer.
- Ian Gallahar, 70s, Irish road racing cyclist.
- Jaime Graça, 70, Portuguese footballer.
- Jim Green, 68, American-born Canadian politician and activist, lung cancer.
- Fritz Hakl, 80, Austrian actor.
- William Hamilton, 87, American theologian.
- Anders Kulläng, 68, Swedish rally driver, drowning.
- Antonio Attolini Lack, 80, Mexican architect.
- Abukar Hassan Mohamoud, 43–49, Somali journalist, shot.
- Hal Roach, 84, Irish comedian.
- Murray Sargent, 83, Australian cricketer (South Australia, Leicestershire).

=== 29 ===
- Taslim Ahmed, Bangladeshi civil servant.
- Roland Bautista, 60, American guitarist (Earth, Wind & Fire).
- Ertjies Bezuidenhout, 56, South African cyclist.
- Prudence Burns Burrell, 95, American nurse.
- Gerald Caravelli, 68, American bridge player.
- Andrew Chew, 82, Singaporean physician, heart failure.
- Dennis Chinnery, 84, British actor (Doctor Who).
- Woody Farmer, 76, American wrestler, cancer.
- Fukuzo Iwasaki, 86, Japanese businessman.
- Davy Jones, 66, British actor and musician (The Monkees), heart attack.
- Karl Kodat, 69, Austrian international footballer.
- Sheldon Moldoff, 91, American comic book artist (Batman, Superman, Blackhawk), kidney failure.
- Horacio Morales, 68, Filipino economist and politician, Secretary of Agrarian Reform (1998–2001), heart attack.
- P. K. Narayana Panicker, 81, Indian welfare worker, President of the Nair Service Society.
- Vasilis Tsivilikas, 70, Greek comic actor, heart attack.
