= Tom Martinez (disambiguation) =

Tom Martinez may refer to:

- Tom Martinez, French football coach
- Tom Martinez, former guitar player for Solitude Aeturnus
- Tom Martinez, author, former extremist and criminal-turned-informant against Robert Jay Mathews and the neo-Nazi group The Order
- Tom Martinez, character played by William Baldwin in the 1999 Showtime TV movie Brotherhood of Murder, based on the aforementioned author/informant Tom Martinez
