= Robert Lawless =

Robert Lawless may refer to:

- Robert Lawless (anthropologist) (1937–2012), American cultural anthropologist
- Robert W. Lawless (1937–2024), American academic and university president
