= Rodolfo Acevedo =

Chilean author

Rodolfo Acevedo (13 June 1951 – 17 February 2012) was a Chilean member of the Church of Jesus Christ of Latter-day Saints. He is most noted as a writer. He wrote the book Los Mormones en Chile (The Mormons in Chile). He also wrote Alturas Sagradas, a history of the Santiago Chile Temple of the Church of Jesus Christ of Latter-day Saints (LDS Church). He originally wrote this work as his thesis at the Pontifical Catholic University of Chile.

Acevedo joined the LDS Church in San Antonio, Chile in 1968. His home was used as the location for an early-morning seminary class in the 1970s. For a time he worked as a teacher at the church-owned Deseret School in Chile.

In 1991, he published The Mormons in Chile, which was the first book-length work published on Chilean Mormonism.

In 1999, Acevedo was serving as director of public affairs for the Chile Area of the church.

Acevedo was a bishop of the LDS Church. In 2006, he was serving as the patriarch of the Santiago Chile Puente Alto Stake.
