= Ramachandran Ganapati =

- Born: 1 September 1935
- Died: 20 February 2012 (aged 76)

Ramachandran Ganapati (1 September 1935 – 20 February 2012) was an Indian writer.

== Family ==
Ganapati was born on Vinayaka Chaturthi day, 1 September 1935. It was due to this reason that he was named so. His father was C. V. Ramachandra Iyer, honors degree holder in mathematics, vedic scholar, and official in the department of commercial tax, both under the British and the post-independence Indian governments. Ganapati’s mother was Jayalakshmi, a pious lady who hailed from a family of lawyers. Ganapati’s only sibling is Tripurasundari Subrahmanyan.

== Education & career ==
Ganapati was a student of Hindu High School and later the Presidency College, Madras. He was an honors graduate in English Literature. After a brief stint as reporter, he joined Kalki, the Tamil magazine. A suggestion letter written to M. S. Subbulakshmi proved to be a life changer. Kalki Sadasivam, who read the letter, immediately invited Ganapati to join Kalki. He also assisted C. Rajagopalachari in the editorial functions of his journal Swarajya. He had contributed to editorial and music reviews in Kalki and had written under the pen-name of Kanya. He regularly contributed articles and advised artists’ features on religion, temples, and epic-episodes. One of his most outstanding and much-quoted articles was the one on Kanchi Mahaswamigal delineation of the Muthuswami Dikshitar classic Shri Subrahmanyaya Namaste to Ariyakudi Ramanuja Iyengar.

== Works ==
His first big work was Jaya Jaya Shankara, which was published as a serial in Kalki in 1962. Reading about Adi Shankara and his philosophy of Advaita, in this book, people went to meet him for clarifications, and were taken by surprise to see a youngster as the author of such a complex subject. After working at Kalki for over ten years, he went on to write several other serialized biographies of saints like Ramakrishna, Swami Vivekananda, Sarada Devi, and Mirabai.

Over another 25 years, after leaving Kalki, he wrote a number of books and articles touching on the life and deeds of religious luminaries Kanchi Mahaswamigal. It is called as Deivathin Kural meaning "The voice of God", Sathya Sai Baba, Swami Vivekananda, Ramana Maharshi, Yogi Ramsuratkumar, and others.

== Death ==
Ganapati died on 20 February 2012 on a Maha Sivaratri Day. Thus, both the day on which he was born and on which he died were special days for Hindus.

== See also ==
- Kanchi Kamakoti Peetham
