= Ibrahim Al-Faqi =

Writer, lecturer, self-development coach (1950–2012)

- Born: August 5, 1950; Alexandria, Egypt
- Died: February 10, 2012 (aged 61); Nasr City, Cairo
- Cause of death: Asphyxia
- Citizenship: Egypt, Canada
- Occupations: Coach, businessperson, author, motivational speaker
- Website: ibrahimelfiky.com

Ibrahim Al-Faqi or Ibrahim Elfiki (August 5, 1950 – February 10, 2012) was a human development and neuro-linguistic programming expert, was the CEO of the Canadian Training Centre for Human Development, and the founder of Ibrahim Elfiky International Enterprises Inc.

== Early life ==
Ibrahim Mohammed El-Saied Elfiki was born in Alexandria, Egypt. He was a table tennis player and the champion of Egyptian Table Tennis League for many years, and represented Egypt in the World Table Tennis Championships in Munich 1969. Married to Amal Atieh and had two daughters, Nancy and Nermin.

In his professional life, he was promoted to the department director in the hospitality industry in the Helnan Palestine Hotel Alexandria. He immigrated to Canada to study management, and worked there as a dishwasher and a guard for a restaurant and porter in a hotel.

== Bibliography ==
He has many visible and audio content from his lectures, and had written tens of books, some of them have been translated into English, French, Kurdish, and Indonesian.

Some of his self-help book titles:

- 10 Keys To Ultimate Success
- Way to Success and Rich
- On The Road To Sales Mastery: The Ultimate Sales Guide
- The Path of Excellence
- Life without Tension
- Awaken Your Abilities and Make Your Future
- Successful personal secrets
- Control Your Life: To Be More Successful and Happy
- Neuro-linguistic Programming & Unlimited Communication Power
- 12 Keys of Highly Successful Managers

== Death ==
On Friday morning of February 10, 2012, Ibrahim Elfiki, his sister, and their housekeeper had been found dead after a fire broke out at his apartment. The fire had started in the Ibrahim Al-Faqi Center for Human Development on the third floor and extended to the rest of the property, in which he resided. Elfiki, his sister, Fawqiyah Muhammad ElFiki (62 years old) and Nawal (The housekeeper) died in the blaze.
