= Haycene Ryan =

Montserratian cricketer

Personal information
- Full name: Haycene Everton Ryan
- Born: 7 July 1951; George Street, Montserrat
- Died: 22 February 2012 (aged 60); Manchester, Lancashire, England
- Nickname: Chico
- Batting: Left-handed
- Bowling: Right-arm medium

Domestic team information
- Years: Team
- 1980/81: Leeward Islands
- 1970–1986: Montserrat

Career statistics
Competition	First-class	List A
Matches	2	2
Runs scored	19	17
Batting average	6.33	8.50
100s/50s	–/–	–/–
Top score	13*	16
Balls bowled	78	24
Wickets	1	–
Bowling average	24.00	–
5 wickets in innings	–	–
10 wickets in match	–	–
Best bowling	1/16	–
Catches/stumpings	2/–	–/–
- Source: Cricinfo, 14 October 2012

Haycene Everton Ryan (7 July 1951 – 22 February 2012) was a West Indian cricketer. Ryan was a left-handed batsman who bowled right-arm medium pace. He was born on Montserrat, the son of Robert Hixon.

Ryan first played for Montserrat against St Kitts cricket team in the 1970 Hesketh Bell Shield. Having played for Montserrat throughout the 1970s, Ryan was selected in 1981 to represent the Leeward Islands, making two first-class appearances for the team against the Windward Islands at the Arnos Vale Ground, Kingstown, and against a touring England XI at Sturge Park on Montserrat. In that same season, he made two List A appearances for the team Trinidad and Tobago and Jamaica in the 1980/81 Geddes Grant/Harrison Line Trophy. He continued to play minor matches for Montserrat to 1986, having made a total of fifteen recorded appearances for his home island.

In his later life, he worked as a civil servant on Montserrat. He died of cancer at Manchester, Lancashire, England, on 22 February 2012.
