= Lorin Levee =

Lorin Levee (8 July 1950 – 22 February 2012) was an American clarinetist.

Levee studied clarinet at De Paul University. He played clarinet in the Grant Park Symphony, the Chicago Lyric Opera Orchestra, the Chicago Chamber Orchestra, and the American Ballet Theatre Orchestra. He was on the faculty of De Paul University for 3 years.

He was also principal clarinetist for the Colorado Music Festival and the Teton Festival. He joined the Los Angeles Philharmonic in 1976 on bass clarinet, becoming principal clarinetist in 1981. He remained in that position until his death, playing his last concert in January 2012. Levee was a Yamaha Performing Artist. He died in 2012 of a blood disorder.
