= Mohamed Fourati =

Tunisian cardiovascular surgeon

Pr. Mohamed Fourati
- Born: January 18, 1932; Tunis, Tunisia
- Died: February 26, 2012 (aged 80); Sfax, Tunisia
- Citizenship: Tunisia
- Education: Faculté de médecine de Lille Doctorate in Medecine (1959)
- Occupation: Lecturer Professor in cardiac surgery
- Known for: First open-heart surgery in the arab-muslim world
- Medical career
- Profession: Surgeon
- Field: cardiovascular surgery
- Sub-specialties: open-heart surgery

Mohamed Fourati (Arabic:محمد فراتي) (January 18, 1932 – February 26, 2012) was a Tunisian cardiovascular surgeon. He pioneered in open-heart surgery in the Arab-Muslim world. As a professor and lecturer for 39 years, he taught and mentored a generation of young surgeons in Tunisia.

== Biography ==
A year after getting his philosophy baccalaureate in his native town Sfax, Mohamed Fourati moved to Lille (France) to pursue his graduate education in the medical school of Lille. In order to validate his studies, he became an intern in the Farhat-Hachad Hospital of Sousse. Traveling between the two continents, he secured, in 1959, a medical doctorate at the medical school of Lille.

He performed his military service, the following year, in the region of El Kef (in north-eastern Tunisia) and in Kébili (southern Tunisia). He continued to specialize in thoracic and cardiovascular surgery at the Saint-Joseph Hospital of Paris. He got assigned to the general surgery unit of doctors Saïd Mestiri and Zouhair Essafi at the Habib-Thameur Hospital in Tunis. In 1961, over the month of July, he worked as a surgeon in the battle of Bizerte, performing surgery on patients 20 hours a day for many days.

He got appointed as hospital assistant in 1966, then earned the title of chief physician of the surgical ward in the Habib-Thameur Hospital in May 1968 and became, at the age of 35, the youngest chief physician in Tunisia. In November of the same year, he performed the first open-heart surgery, favored by a delegation of doctors of the IFTHD (led by Charles Hahn of the Cantonal hospital of Geneva (Switzerland)).

In 1970, he performed a first in the Arab-Muslim world when implanting a STARR valve (Albert Starr) in mitral position. Three years later, he executed the first double valve replacement, mitral and aortic. In the same year, he got appointed as docent at the medical school of Tunis. Continuing his work, he successfully got, in 1974, his Aggregration in surgery in Paris,. On July 11, 1975, he performed an open-heart surgery, filmed and retransmitted on television, in the presence of the president of the Tunisian Republic, Habib Bourguiba.

On January 16, 1980, he got designated as a member of the French National Academy of Surgery. During that year, he formed a cardiac surgery unit in the Habib-Thameur Hospital, independent of other general surgery activities. He earned the title of professor of surgery in 1982. From 1982 to 1984, he chaired the Tunisian Association of Cardiology (ATC) and the offices of the Tunisian Society of Cardiology and Cardiovascular Surgery (STCCCV) from 1983 to 1985. He got appointed as chief physician at the Military Hospital of Tunis in 1989.

On January 15, 1993, at 2 am, he successfully performed the first cardiac transplant, which was considered a notable achievement in the Arab-Muslim world. The context was the following: a young man died in an accident and brain death got attested by a medical examiner after confirmation by 2 electroencephalograms. Having to refer to the appropriate authorities of the Military Hospital and the Ministry of Defence, an authorization to take the organ is given in application of the law n ° 91-22 of March 25, 1991. A race against the clock began to ready the receiver in order to strengthen the chances of carrying out a successful transplant. All the staff involved were mobilized that night for this surgical first. This law of 25 March 1991 states that the removal of organs from a deceased person in a brain-dead state is defined by rigorous criteria. Brain death must be recognized by two independent physicians and be based on the presumption of consent. If the refusal is not clearly expressed, it is possible to remove the organs "for therapeutic purposes". If the will has not been expressed, the law authorizes the family to dispose of the body and to eventually oppose the removal. In Tunisia, the previous legal regulation, in relation to organ harvesting, was the beylical decree of 19 July 1952. The latter concerned only the deceased without acknowledging brain death which was, at the time, an unknown concept.

A year later, Mohamed Fourati retired at the age of 62 and continued to lecture.

On February 26, 2012, he died at the age of 80 at his home in Tunis. Tributes were then paid to his life by administrative, religious and scientific authorities.

== Frequented institutions ==
- Farhat-Hached Hospital in Sousse;
- Saint-Joseph Hospital in Paris (14th arrondissement);
- Habib-Thameur Hospital in Tunis;
- Military Hospital in Tunis.

== Private life ==
In 1955, he met and married Michèle Roly, with whom he has four children: the eldest Kamel, doctor and orthopedic and traumatological surgeon in Tunis; Sonia, senior lecturer in mathematics at the Probability and Random Model Laboratory in Paris; Samy, a specialist in nuclear radiology at the Brooklyn Hospital in New York; Neil, agronomist in Tunis.

Passionate about agriculture, Mohamed Fourati bought a senia (small farm), in the vicinity of Hammamet, for his vacations and family moments of relaxation .

== Publications ==
- Mohamed Fourati, B. Younes, C. Tauziet et L. Skandrani, "Report on open-heart surgery at the Hôpital Habib Thameur", La Tunisie médicale, Tunis, no 5, 1972, p. 339-344 (ISSN 0041-4131, summary in fr).
- Mohamed Fourati, Rafik Mzali, Rafik Zouari, Abdelwaheb Ounissi, Youssef Sahnoun, Rachid Jlidi et Issam Beyrouti, "Le cystadénome mucineux du pancréas : à propos d'une observation", Association tunisienne de chirurgie, Tunis, no 1, 1995, p. 38-41 (ISSN 0330-5961, summary in fr).
- Mohamed Fourati, M. Ben Ismaïl, A. Bousnina, F. Zouari et J. Lacronique, "Kyste hydatique autochtone à localisation cardiaque d'évolution favorable", La Presse médicale, Tunis, vol. 29, no 21, juin 2000, p. 1175 (summary in fr).
- Mohamed Fourati, M. Ben Ismaïl, A. Bousnina, F. Zouari et J. Lacronique, "Kyste hydatique du cœur simulant une ischémie coronarienne", Annales de cardiologie et d'angéiologie, Paris, Éditions scientifiques et médicales, vol. 50, no 4, 2001, p. 206-210 (summary in fr).
- Mohamed Fourati, H. Marrak, N. Mnajja, S. Fenniche, M. Zghal, E. Chaker, M. Ben Ayed et I. Mokhtar, "Chromomycose : à propos d'une observation", Journal de mycologie médicale, Paris, Éditions scientifiques et médicales, vol. 13, no 1, mars 2003, p. 37-39 (summary in fr).
- Mohamed Fourati, H. Khouadja, H. Kechiche, K. Souissi et A. Mebazaa, Médicaments inotropes : Insuffisance circulatoire aiguë (avec plan), Paris, Elsevier Masson SAS, 2009 (summary in fr).
- Mohamed Fourati, M. Feki, A. Zouari, S. Sessi, F. Mnif, N. Kaffel, N. Charfi et M. Abid, "Hyperleptinémie et insulino-résistance chez les femmes obèses tunisiennes (avec résumé)", Diabetes & Metabolism, Paris, vol. 35, no 51, mars 2009, p. 88 (summary in fr).

== Appendix ==
=== Bibliography ===
- Bourguiba Ben Rejeb, Professeur Mohamed Fourati, chirurgien de la première transplantation cardiaque en Tunisie (Professor Mohamed Fourati, surgeon of the first cardiac transplantation in Tunisia), Tunis: Finzi, 2007, 173 p. (ISBN 9789973844774, French online presentation).
- Mohamed Bergaoui, Médecine et médecins de Tunisie, de Carthage à nos jours (Medicine and doctors in Tunisia, from Carthage to the present day), Tunis: Berg edition, 2009, 255 p. (ISBN 9789938950304, french online presentation).

=== External links ===
- Mohamed Salah Ben Ammar (pref. Louis Puybasset), Islam et transplantation d’organes (Islam and organ transplantation), Paris: Springer, 2009, 250 p. (ISBN 2287928448 et 9782287928444, French online presentation).
- "The Odyssey of cardiac surgery in the Maghreb" [PDF], clubcmcc.org (Retrieved 22 March 2018).
