= Robert Christie (cricketer) =

English cricketer

Personal information
- Full name: Robert Douglas Christie
- Born: 8 March 1942; New Delhi, British India
- Died: 8 February 2012 (aged 69); Costa Rica
- Batting: Right-handed
- Bowling: Right-arm medium

Domestic team information
- Years: Team
- 1964: Oxford University

Career statistics
Competition	First-class
Matches	4
Runs scored	47
Batting average	11.75
100s/50s	–/–
Top score	21
Balls bowled	576
Wickets	8
Bowling average	39.37
5 wickets in innings	–
10 wickets in match	–
Best bowling	4/44
Catches/stumpings	–/–
- Source: Cricinfo, 4 March 2020

Robert Douglas Christie (7 March 1942 – 8 February 2012) was an English first-class cricketer.

Christie was born in British India at New Delhi. He was educated in England at Eton College, before going up to New College, Oxford. While studying at Oxford, he played first-class cricket for Oxford University in 1964, making four appearances. He scored 47 runs in his four matches, with a high score of 21. With his right-arm medium pace bowling, he took 8 wickets with best figures of 4 for 44. After graduating from Oxford, Christie worked in the financial industry. He died suddenly while on holiday in Costa Rica in February 2012.
