= Herman G. Tillman Jr. =

Herman G. "Hank" Tillman Jr.
- Born: 1 April 1922; Baltimore, Maryland
- Died: 19 February 2012 (aged 89); Chester, Maryland
- Military career
- Allegiance: United States of America
- Branch: United States Air Force
- Rank: Colonel
- Awards: Distinguished Flying Cross (multiple); Purple Heart; Silver Star; 16 Air Medals; 2 Legions of Merit; Presidential Unit Citation

Herman G. "Hank" Tillman Jr. (1 April 1922 – 19 February 2012) was an American United States Air Force pilot who served in three wars and was one of Maryland's most decorated veterans. He served as the wingman for Jimmy Doolittle during a raid on Rome. During the Korean War, he ferried planes to South Korea. He flew 105 combat missions in Vietnam.

Tillman led the 66th Tactical Reconnaissance Wing at RAF Upper Heyford, Oxfordshire, England. At the time of his retirement in 1972, he was chief of staff of the 9th Air Force in Sumter, South Carolina. he died of organ failure on February 19, 2012 in Chester Maryland at age 89.
