= Maria Fischer-Slyzh =

Ukrainian doctor and philanthropist

- Марія Фішер-Слиж
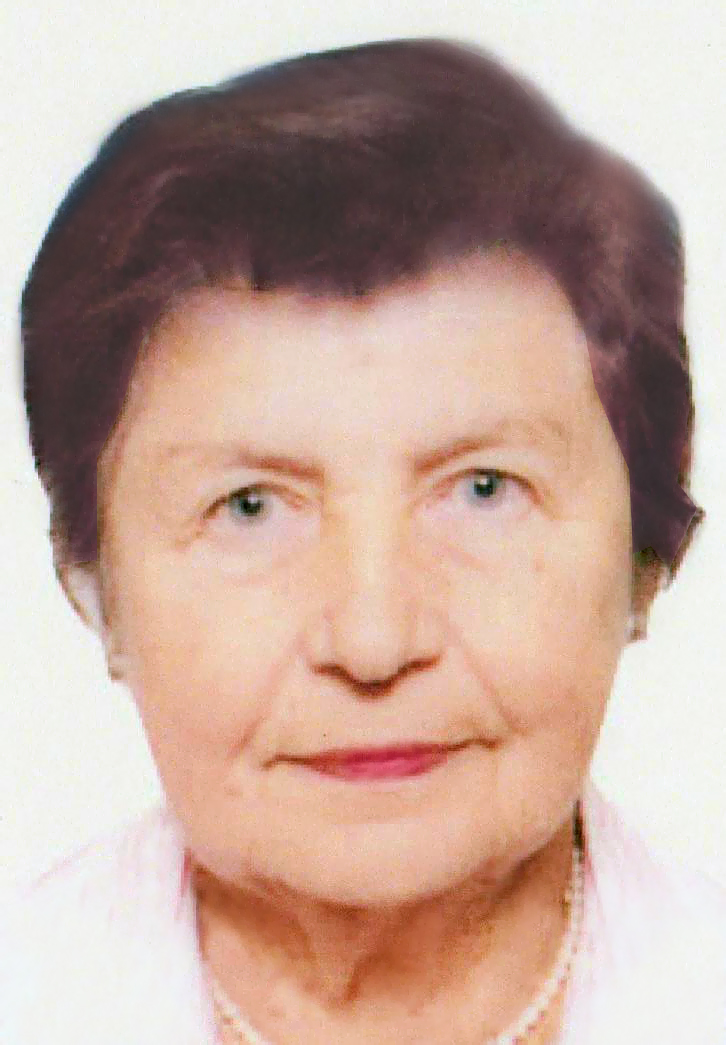
- Born: September 13, 1922; Kolomyia, Stanisławów Voivodeship, Second Polish Republic (now Ukraine)
- Died: February 13, 2012 (aged 89); Toronto, Ontario, Canada
- Education: Lviv Academic Gymnasium, Ludwig-Maximilians-Universität München
- Occupations: pediatrician, philanthropist

Maria Fischer-Slyzh (Note: Ukrainian: Марія Фішер-Слиж, romanized: Mariia Fisher-Slyzh) (September 13, 1922 – February 13, 2012) was a pediatrician, a member of the Board of the Ukrainian Medical Association of North America in Chicago, board member of the Canadian Friends of Ukraine Society in Toronto, League of Ukrainian Patrons in Kyiv, and Honorary Member of the Shevchenko Scientific Society in the United States. She was one of the initiators and supporters of a number of projects in Ukraine to establish Canadian-Ukrainian library centers, develop the Scout movement, introduce native language competitions, encourage creative language teachers, and students, and help the Ukrainian church.

== Life ==
Maria Slyzh was born in Kolomyia, Stanisławów Voivodeship, Second Polish Republic (now Ukraine) into a religious, large family of Judge Adolf and Olga Slyzh (of the Zholkevich family). Maria had sisters Yaroslava and Daria and brothers Anton and Volodymyr. She spent her childhood in the Lviv region, city of Belz. As a child, Slyzh was affectionately called "Usia", the girl got used to this name, relatives and acquaintances got used to it, and who called her that in adult life. In 1933, the Slyzh family moved to Lviv, where Maria attended the Lviv Academic Gymnasium. Having been blacklisted by the People's Commissariat for Internal Affairs (NKVD) with the occupation of Western Ukraine, the Slyzh family first moved to the Polish city of Chełm, where Maria passed the final exams in the gymnasium, and later - to Munich.

At the end of World War II, the Slyzh family found themselves in a displaced person camp in Germany, where Maria studied foreign languages and improved her education. In 1949, Slyzh graduated from the Medical Faculty of the Ludwig-Maximilians-Universität München, graduating in 1950 with a dissertation on the presence of tuberculosis in the lymph nodes of the lungs in the absence of pulmonary tuberculosis.

== In the USA ==
That same year, the Slyzh family moved to the United States, where Maria gained medical experience in hospitals in Brooklyn, New York, passed her 1954 exams, and received a license to practice medicine in Illinois. She soon improved her skills and passed the exams before the National Association of Medical Examiners: in 1960 — in pediatrics, in 1962 — for foreign doctors, medical examinations in New York State. Slyzh wrote a number of scientific papers and articles on medical topics.

In 1959, Maria married Rudolf Fischer, who graduated from medical school in Berlin, and served as a military doctor at the Wehrmacht on the Western and Eastern fronts. She later opened a private practice in Kankakee, 60 km from Chicago, where she worked for 31 years. In 1982, her husband, Rudolf Fischer, died.

== Community service in Canada ==
After her husband's death, Fischer-Slyzh moved to Canada and settled in Toronto, taking an active part in the life of the Ukrainian community. Fischer-Slyzh became a member of the board of the Ukrainian Medical Association of North America (UMANA), chairman of the Society of Friends of the Academic Gymnasium in the Diaspora, and a member of the board of the Canadian Friends of Ukraine Society.

As a member of Plast since 1947, Fischer-Slyzh financially supported Canadian organizations from Canada in Kyiv, Lviv, and Simferopol. Fischer-Slyzh soon became a member of the Shevchenko Scientific Society and the League of Ukrainian Patrons. In 2002, as a patron, she visited the Central City Library in Chernihiv named after Mykhailo Kotsyubynsky and the Ukrainian-Canadian Center.

== Patronage activities in Ukraine ==
Fischer-Slyzh is known in Ukraine as a philanthropist who, after Ukraine became independent, provided funds for Ukrainian research projects.

She was a patron and a sponsor of Kyiv magazines "Smoloskyp", "Vsesvit", "Sunflower", as well as publications "Sivershchyna" (Chernihiv), "Medical collection of Shevchenko Scientific Society" (Lviv). She often contributed to newspapers and magazines and was published in Ukrainian and diaspora publications.

Fischer-Slyzh invested in archeological excavations in Baturyn, provided assistance to schools in Lviv, Sevastopol, Feodosia, headed the committee of the Academic Gymnasium (Lviv) in the diaspora. Fischer-Slyzh also funded the literary competition "We are your children, Ukraine" (Simferopol).

=== Canadian-Ukrainian library centers ===
Fischer-Slyzh contributed to the development of Canadian-Ukrainian library centers in Ukraine within the special program of the Society of Friends of Ukraine: Luhansk, Donetsk, Kharkiv, Sevastopol, Simferopol, Odesa, Chernihiv, Sumy, Dnipropetrovsk, Mariupol, and Poltava. Fischer-Slyzh organized the delivery from Canada to Ukraine and the free transfer of thousands of Ukrainian books and magazines, most of which were not published in Ukraine and were unknown to the public. She was personally present at the opening of a number of Centers and then visited them for many years. In particular, Maria came to Chernihiv with another activist of the Ukrainian community in Canada, Stepan Horlach, who was in charge of the program of opening Library Centers since the 1990s.

In December 1998, Fischer-Slyzh founded a library that was opened in Sevastopol. At the beginning the fund consisted of 147 boxes with 12 thousand books and periodicals in Ukrainian and English in history, literature, economics, and political science. Greetings from the Prime Minister of Canada Jean Chrétien, the leaders of the Ukrainian Catholic Church and the Ukrainian Orthodox Church of the Kyiv Patriarchate, the chairman of the Society of Friends of Ukraine Bohdan Vynnytsky, and the Representative of the President of Ukraine in Crimea Vasyl Kiselyov testified to the importance of this initiative.

=== Ukrainian Catholic University in Lviv ===
In 2009, Fischer-Slyzh contributed $1 million to the Ukrainian Catholic University in Lviv (UCU) with the goal of educating and spiritually developing the leaders of the Ukrainian nation to serve in Ukraine and abroad. Thus Fischer-Slyzh became Canada's largest personal patron of the university. As a token of gratitude, the two departments of the university were named after Maria Fischer-Slyz and her husband Rudolf Fischer. The gift of the patroness made it possible to support the intellectual and research work of professors of these departments, including the introduction of new programs to train professional theologians, historians, social educators, catechists, and teachers of Christian ethics.

The UCU is also cooperating with the Canadian Institute of Ukrainian Studies as part of the Petro Yatsyk Modern Ukrainian History and Society Studies Program. On January 21, 2011, the Ukrainian Catholic University hosted the consecration of Dr. Maria Fischer-Slyzh's nameplate as part of the Congress of Representatives of the World Fundraising Summit (UCU) in the United States and Canada.

=== Crimea project ===
A difficult state-building problem in Crimea prompted the Canadian Society of Friends of Ukraine in 1997 to launch the Crimea Project, aimed at building Ukrainian identity in young people and raising the prestige of Ukrainians. The project included a literary contest "We are your children, Ukraine!" with categories of prose, poetry and journalism; the awards were presented in the television program "Our House". The patron of the competition was Maria Fischer-Slyzh, who published books with the works of the winners at her own expense.

In addition, the site "Ukrainian life in Sevastopol" formed a Ukrainian online library that was financially supported by Maria Fischer-Slyzh.

=== English translation of Mykhailo Hrushevsky's works ===
In August 2009, Maria Fischer-Slyzh donated $100,000 for the edition of the 9th volume, Book 2, Part 2, Mykhailo Hrushevsky's History of Ukraine-Rus, dedicated to the last period of Bohdan Khmelnytsky's hetmanship translated by Marta Oliynyk. The volume was published in memory of her parents: Dr. Adolf and Olga Slyzh. In 2010, the Canadian Institute of Ukrainian Studies presented the publication in Toronto at the Ukrainian Canadian Art Foundation Gallery. The meeting noted the role of Maria Fischer-Sliz in this project.

=== Excavations in Baturyn ===
In 1995–1997, archaeologists and students of Chernihiv State University began excavations in the former capital of the Hetmanate, Baturyn. After making a number of discoveries, due to lack of funds, the study was stopped. In 2001, excavations were resumed by Ukrainian and Canadian archaeologists. The sponsors were a number of Ukrainian charities, institutions, and private donors in Canada, including Maria Fischer-Slyzh, who not only funded the cause but was directly involved in the excavations. As a result, a number of interesting archeological findings were discovered, and the materials of the excavations were summarized in the collection of scientific articles "Baturyn Antiquity". Among other patrons, Maria Fischer-Slyzh became the sponsor of this publication.

== Death and tribute ==
Maria Fischer-Slyzh died on February 13, 2012, in Toronto, Ontario, and, according to her will, was buried next to her husband in a Ukrainian Cemetery in South Bound Brook, USA.

The Pedagogical Prize named after Maria Fischer-Slyzh was founded in Ukraine. It has several dozen scholarship holders — the best teachers of Ukrainian language and literature.

== Awards ==
- The Triumph International Literary Prize (2002)
- The Order of Princess Olga III degree (2009)
