= Bob Roesner =

American baseball umpire (1926-2012)

Robert A. Roesner (1926 - February 6, 2012) served as a replacement umpire in Major League Baseball in 1978 and 1979. He umpired one game in 1978, on August 25, and 16 games in 1979, appearing in his final game on May 12. He also scouted for the Milwaukee Brewers in the early 1970s.

== Early life ==
Roesner was born in Baltimore, Maryland, and grew up in Middle River. He attended Loyola Blakefield High School.

== Miscellany ==
His umpiring crew was cast for the movie Major League II in 1994.

He died February 6, 2012, in Naples, Florida.
