= Luis Javier Garrido =

Mexican political analyst (1941-2012)

Luis Javier Garrido Platas (1941 – February 2, 2012) was a Mexican political analyst, researcher, writer and academic.

Garrido was born in Mexico City in 1941. His father, Luis Garrido Díaz, served as the rector of National Autonomous University of Mexico from 1948 to 1952 and again from 1952 to 1953. A political analyst and professor, Garrido taught at the National Autonomous University of Mexico. One of his best known books, El Partido de la revolución Institucionalizada, was first published in 1982.

Garrido died on February 2, 2012, at the age of 71.
