= Tasoltan Tazretovich Basiev =

Soviet and Russian photonics scientist

Tasoltan Tazretovich Basiev Тасолтан Тазретович Басиев
- Born: September 23, 1947; Moscow, USSR
- Died: February 23, 2012 (aged 64); Moscow, Russia
- Education: Moscow Power Engineering Institute
- Scientific career
- Fields: Photonics

Tasoltan Tazretovich Basiev (Russian: Тасолтан Тазретович Басиев; 1947 – 2012) was a Soviet and Russian scientist and professor in the field of photonics.

== Early life ==
Basiev was born in 1947 in Moscow.

He graduated from the Moscow Power Engineering Institute in 1972. After graduation, he started working at the Lebedev Physical Institute of the Russian Academy of Sciences. In 1984, Basiev went defended his doctoral dissertation "Selective laser spectroscopy of activated crystals and glasses".

He created fluoride laser nano-ceramics and the mono crystal laser, which is a solid-state laser with an energy of more than 100 Joules (100 ns), that had a peak power of more than 200 GW (500 fs). He developed new SRS crystals and lasers. He established the quadruple mechanism of coherent entanglement in nanoclusters and weakened coherence. Those are methods for nanophotonics of RE ions in laser crystals and glasses.

He is the author and co-author of 412 scientific works, 36 of which are reviews, 4 monographs and earned 28 patents.

== Recognition ==
Basiev was a member of the RAS Commission on Prizes for Young Scientists of the Russian Federation, the Scientific Council of the Russian Academy of Sciences on Spectroscopy of Atoms and Molecules, the editorial board of Optical Materials and Quantum Electronics and a Ph.D. Member of the American Optical Society.

== Literature ==
- Четырехволновая генерация ВКР-компонент излучения в кристаллах BaWO4 и SrWO4 при пикосекундном возбуждении -Т. Т. Басиев, М. Е. Дорошенко, Л. И. Ивлева, С. Н. Сметанин, М. Елинек, В. Кубечек, Х. Елинкова
- Безрезонаторная стохастическая лазерная генерация в нанокомпозитной среде – С. Н. Сметанин, Т. Т. Басиев
- Cинхронизация четырехволновых взаимодействий ВКР-компонент в двулучепреломляющих ВКР-кристаллах – С. Н. Сметанин, Т. Т. Басиев
- Кинетика сверхбыстрого миграционно-ускоренного тушения в наночастицах – Н. А. Глушков, Т. Т. Басиев, И. Т. Басиева
