= Herman Fialkov =

American entrepreneur, venture capitalist and philanthropist

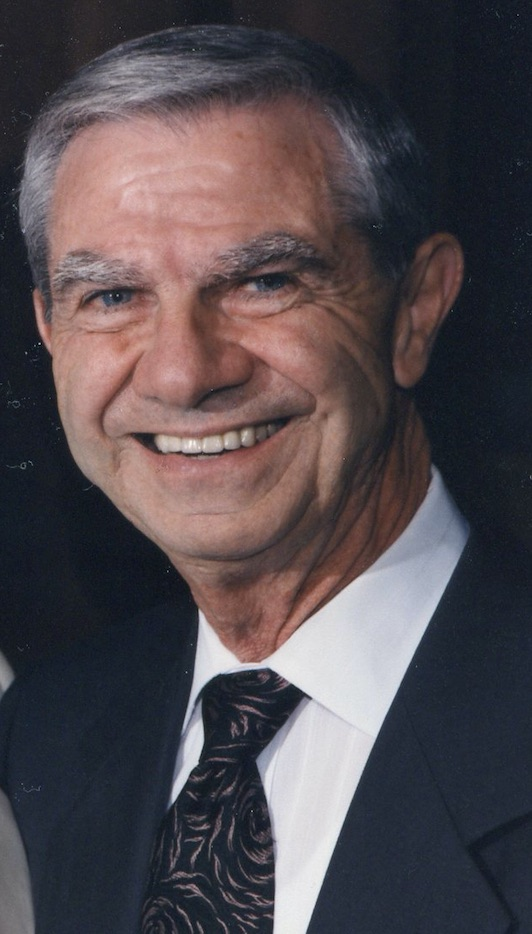
- Herman Fialkov in 1992
- Born: March 23, 1922; Brooklyn, New York
- Died: February 21, 2012 (aged 89); Boca Raton, Florida
- Education: New York University Tandon School of Engineering (Bachelor of Engineering)
- Occupations: Engineer at Emerson Radio; Founder of General Transistor Corporation; Founding Partner at Newlight Associates
- Spouse: Elaine Dampf Fialkov

Herman Fialkov (23 March 1922 – 21 February 2012) was an American entrepreneur, venture capitalist, and philanthropist. He is best known for co-founding the General Transistor Corp. in 1954, a technology company that became a pioneer of microchips. He graduated from New York University Tandon School of Engineering, formerly known as the Polytechnic Institute of New York University.

== Life and career ==
He was born on 23 March 1922 in Brooklyn, New York the son of two Jewish immigrants, Pearl (née Heinish) and Isidore Fialkov. Growing up on welfare during the Great Depression, he delivered milk before school to earn money for the family.

He served in the U.S. Army during World War II, earning the Bronze Star Medal with two Oak leaf clusters during the Battle of the Bulge. Thanks to the G.I. Bill he was able to earn a bachelor's degree in administrative engineering from the Polytechnic University of New York in 1951. He worked at Emerson Radio from 1946–1947, Mutual Broadcasting System from 1947-1949 and the Radio Receptor Company from 1949 - 1954.

In 1954 he co-founded General Transistor Corporation, a technology company that became a pioneer of microchips. When General Transistor merged with General Instrument Corp. in 1960, Fialkov convinced General Instrument's leadership to venture into cable television, purchasing Jerrold Electronics – a company that ultimately evolved into Comcast.

In 1968, Fialkov founded his own venture capital firm, Geiger and Fialkov and also set up several others, including Aleph Null and Polyventures. He served as a partner in the Jericho-based venture capital firm Newlight Associates until 2004. In his more than 40 years in venture capital, Fialkov provided investments that helped finance the startup or early development of many international tech companies including Intel, Teledyne and Long Island-based Envision, Standard Microsystems and Globecomm Systems.

In 1999, global accounting firm Ernst & Young honored Fialkov with a lifetime achievement award for entrepreneurship. In 2004, the Long Island Capital Alliance named an annual award after him.

In 1942, he married the former Elaine Dampf (died 1998). They had two children, Carol and Jay.
