= Leta Peer =

Swiss artist (1964–2012)

Leta Peer (17 April 1964 – 13 February 2012) was a Swiss painter and fine art photographer.

== Life ==
From 1984 to 1987, Peer studied painting at the School of Design in Basel under Franz Fedier. From 1996 to 1997 she lectured as a visiting lecturer at the HISK - Higher Institute for Fine Arts, Antwerp, Belgium.

== Exhibitions (selection) ==
2010: Gratwanderung! (balancing act!), Group exhibition at Neuer Kunstverein in Aachen

== Awards ==
- 1986: Press award, annual exhibition of the Bündner Kunstmuseum Chur, Switzerland
- 1992: Artist scholarship from Kunstkredit Basel-Stadt, Switzerland
- 1993: Scholarship Cité internationale des arts in Paris
- 1994: Sponsorship prize from the Canton Graubünden, Switzerland
- 1998: Atelier in Brooklyn, New York, through the Foundation Giovannina Bazzi-Mengiardi,
- 1999: Artist scholarship from Kunstkredit Basel-Stadt, Switzerland
- 1999: Atelier in Montréal, Kanada, through the IAAB Christoph Merian Foundation,
- 2000: International Studio Program New York City, USA, catalogue
- 2002: Pollock-Krasner Scholarship, New York City, USA
