= Filippo Giannini =

- Titular bishop of the Subaugusta
- Church: Roman Catholic Church
- See: Titular see of Subaugusta
- In office: 1980 - 2012
- Predecessor: Ferdinando Maggioni
- Successor: TBA
- Previous post(s): Priest

Orders
- Ordination: 15 June 1946

Personal details
- Born: 9 May 1923; Nettuno, Italy
- Died: 10 February 2012 (aged 88)

Filippo Giannini (9 May 1923 – 10 February 2012) was an Italian prelate of the Catholic Church.

== Biography ==
Giannini was born in Nettuno, Italy, and ordained a priest on 15 June 1946. He was named appointed auxiliary bishop to the Diocese of Rome on 1 December 1980, as well as Titular Bishop of Subaugusta and ordained bishop on 6 January 1981. Giannini retired as an auxiliary bishop of Rome on 3 July 1998, and died in 2012, aged 88.

== See also ==
- Diocese of Rome
