= Pedro Azabache Bustamante =

Peruvian painter

- Born: Pedro Azabache Bustamante; January 31, 1918; Moche, La Libertad, Peru
- Died: February 27, 2012 (aged 94); Moche, Peru
- Known for: Painter

Pedro Azabache Bustamante (Moche (Peru) January 31, 1918 - February 27, 2012) was a Peruvian painter, pupil of Julia Codesido and Jose Sabogal and was one of the few direct followers of indigenismo. He studied at the National School of Fine Arts in Lima where he joined in 1937. In June 1944 he presented his first solo show in the exclusive exposition rooms of the cultural institution "Insula" at the invitation of the poet José Gálvez Barrenechea. In 1962, he founded the School of Fine Arts Macedonio de la Torre in Trujillo city, and was its first director.

== Work ==
An indigenist and costumbrist painter, his works depicted scenes of Moche, patron saints such as San Isidro Labrador, a portrait of his mother, and other subjects. His paintings have been exhibited internationally and depict landscapes and faces from the Peruvian coast and sierra.

== See also ==
- José Sabogal
