= Tariq al-Dahab =

Yemeni al-Qaeda leader (c. 1975 – 2012)

- Born: 1974–1977
- Died: 15 February 2012; Rada'a District, Yemen
- Occupation: AQAP Emir
- Military career
- Allegiance: Al-Qaeda
- Branch: AQAP
- Service years: ?–2012
- Rank: Emir of the Rada'a District
- Conflicts: Yemen Insurgency: Al Bayda Governorate clashes (2012-2013) †

Tariq al-Dahab (1974 to 1977 – 15 February 2012), was the AQAP Emir in the Rada'a District. He was the brother in law of Al-Qaeda leader Anwar al-Awlaki by his sister. He was a member of the powerful al-Dahab clan.

== As the Emir of Rada'a ==
In the middle of January 2012, he led an offensive in the Rada'a District, and succeeded in capturing it. While in control of the city, Tariq flew al Qaeda’s banner in the city buildings and his fighters swore allegiance to Ayman al-Zawahiri, Qaeda's overall Emir. He then released a short videotape urging Muslims “to unite and be patient” as “the Islamic Caliphate is coming.” His half brother, however, Hizamm was one of several tribal leaders who convinced Tariq to withdraw his fighters from Rada’a. In exchange, some 400 of his AQAP fighters, including Hizam's and Tariq's younger brother, Nabil al-Dahab, were freed from government custody. Also, the tribal leaders promised to enforce sharia, or Islamic law, in Rada’a.

== Death ==
A month later, on 15 February, Dahab was killed in a family feud and an ensuing gun battle between his followers and the followers of his half brother, Hizam al-Dahab, who was a follower of Ali Abdullah Saleh. Hizam and his supporters then fled the scene, taking refuge in another house. Tariq's followers led by another brother, Qaed al-Dahab, pursued them and a battle ensued, leaving 16 dead, including Hizam. Tariq was 35 years old when he was killed. A US intelligence official who closely tracks Yemen and AQAP said Nabil and Qaid will succeed Tariq as the new Emirs for Rada'a. Later, AQAP issued a eulogy and acknowledged Tariq's death.
