= Knox Chamblin =

Mississippi pastor

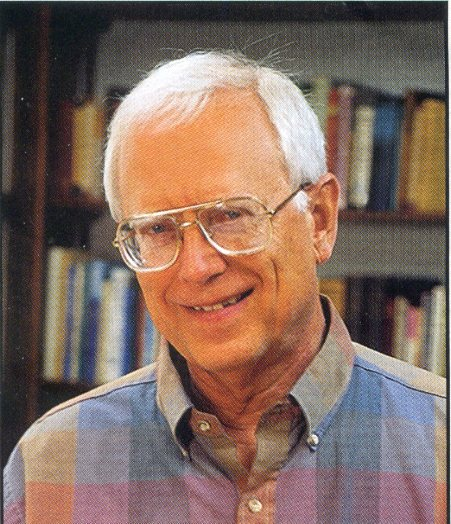
J. Knox Chamblin

Knox Chamblin (December 28, 1935 – February 7, 2012) was a pastor and professor emeritus of New Testament at Reformed Theological Seminary in Jackson, Mississippi. He earned the B.D. and Th.M degrees in 1961 at Columbia Theological Seminary and, in 1975, earned the Th.D. degree from Union Theological Seminary in Richmond, Virginia. He taught for thirty-four years, first at Belhaven College (now Belhaven University) in Jackson, Mississippi, then at Reformed Theological Seminary until his retirement in 2001. He taught the theology of the New Testament and explored and critiqued the theology, life, and writings of C. S. Lewis. He published Matthew Volume 1 (Chapters 1-13): A Mentor Commentary. Volume 2 of this commentary, covering Matthew 14-28, soon followed.
