= John Houlder =

British engineer

Professor John Houlder
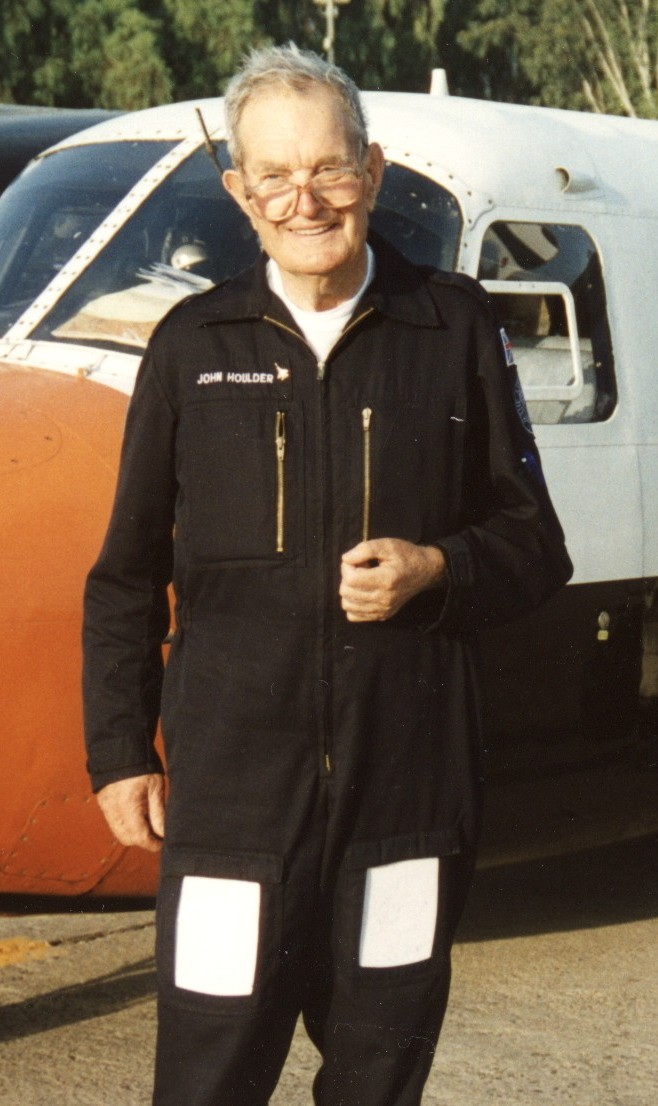
- John Houlder with GAWOE
- Born: John Maurice Houlder; 20 February 1916; Epsom, Surrey
- Died: 2 February 2012 (aged 95)
- Occupations: Engineer, Owner of Houlder Ltd, Operator of Elstree Aerodrome
- Known for: Ship design
- Spouse: Rody
- Awards: CBE, MBE

John Maurice Houlder CBE MBE(Mil.) (20 February 1916 – 2 February 2012) was a British engineer, operator of Elstree Aerodrome. He was a pioneer in marine operations and design and was involved with the Kingsnorth Marine Drilling vessels. His first diving support vessel was the Oregis originally built for Houlder as an Ore carrier, which he had converted for diving. Following this he met Thor Haavie, a marine architect, at an exhibition where he was showing a design for a semisubmersible diving support vessel. Houlder build this vessel in the mid-1970s at the Aker Yard in Norway. Somehow, the vessel came to be named after him and is still operating now as "Uncle John". The next project was the "Orelia" diving support vessel which is a barge like vessel with six independent diesel driven thrusters arranged in a triangular configuration of three forward and three aft.
