= Cuauhtémoc Sandoval Ramírez =

Mexican politician

Cuauhtémoc Sandoval Ramírez (14 August 1950 – 22 February 2012; age, 61) was a Mexican politician, social anthropologist and founding member of the Party of the Democratic Revolution (PRD). He was twice elected as a federal deputy and once a Senator. He served in the Mexican congress as Secretary of Foreign Relations, a member of the National Defense Committee and he is on the Population, Borders and Immigration Issues committee. Cuauhtémoc Sandoval Ramírez was the son of Pablo Sandoval Cruz, a distinguished politician in the State of Guerrero (Mexico). He had a degree in Social Anthropology, and was a founding member of the PRD.
