= Berto Poosen =

Belgian volleyball player (1944–2012)

Personal information
- Born: 27 February 1944; Vlijtingen, Limburg, Belgium
- Died: 26 February 2012 (aged 67); Genk, Limburg, Belgium
- Last updated: 5 August 2012

Berto Poosen (27 February 1944 – 26 February 2012) was a Belgian volleyball player. He competed at the 1968 Summer Olympics.
