= Lidiya Rasulova =

Azerbaijani politician (1941–2012)

Lidiya Khudat Rasulova Order of Glory
- Lidiya Xudat qızı Rəsulova

Minister of Education of the Republic of Azerbaijan
- In office 2 September 1993 – 13 September 1997
- President: Heydar Aliyev
- Preceded by: Firudin Calilov
- Succeeded by: Misir Mardanov

Minister of Social Security of Azerbaijan SSR
- In office 1988–1992

Member of the Soviet of the Union
- In office 1989–1991

Member of the Soviet of Nationalities for Nagorno-Karabakh Autonomous Oblast
- In office 1984–1989

Personal details
- Born: 4 December 1941 Baku, Azerbaijan SSR, Soviet Union
- Died: 5 February 2012 (age 70) Baku, Republic of Azerbaijan

Lidiya Khudat gizi Rasulova, (Azerbaijani: Lidiya Xudat qızı Rəsulova; 4 December 1941 – 5 February 2012), was an Azerbaijani politician.

Lidiya Rasulova was born in Baku on 4 December 1941. After graduating from high school, she studied at the Institute of Pedagogical Languages of Azerbaijan between 1959 and 1965.

Began her work in 1958 in educational establishments in Baku, and worked in different positions in youth organizations, parties and Soviet organizations between 1962 and 1981, becoming the president of the Council of Trade Unions of the Azerbaijani since 1981 until 1988.

In 1984 was elected member of the Soviet of Nationalities. She was also member of the Soviet of the Union, between 1989 and 1991.

Was named Minister of Social Security of Azerbaijan SSR in 1988, holding office until 1992, witnessing the dissolution of the Soviet Union and the independence of Azerbaijan.

Heydar Aliyev appointed her as Minister of Education of the Republic of Azerbaijan on 2 September 1993, until her resignation due to health problems on 13 September 1997. Continued her pedagogical activity and participated in the process of training highly qualified personnel in higher education institutions.

Lidiya Rasulova has a unique role in improving the work of the Azerbaijani trade unions, strengthening their material and technical base, as well as expanding the network of recreation and treatment facilities in Azerbaijan. The creation of rehabilitation centers for people with disabilities in the republic was possible thanks to its direct initiative and organizational capacity. Also contributed to the improvement of the educational system in Azerbaijan and the establishment of her work in line with the demands of the era in the new socio-political conditions.

The work of Lidiya Rasulova was very appreciated by the state and received many orders and medals, including the order of Glory from the Republic of Azerbaijan in 1997 for her active participation in the construction of the state.

Being a famous public figure, Rasulova died on 5 February 2012.
