= H. M. Darmstandler =

United States Air Force general

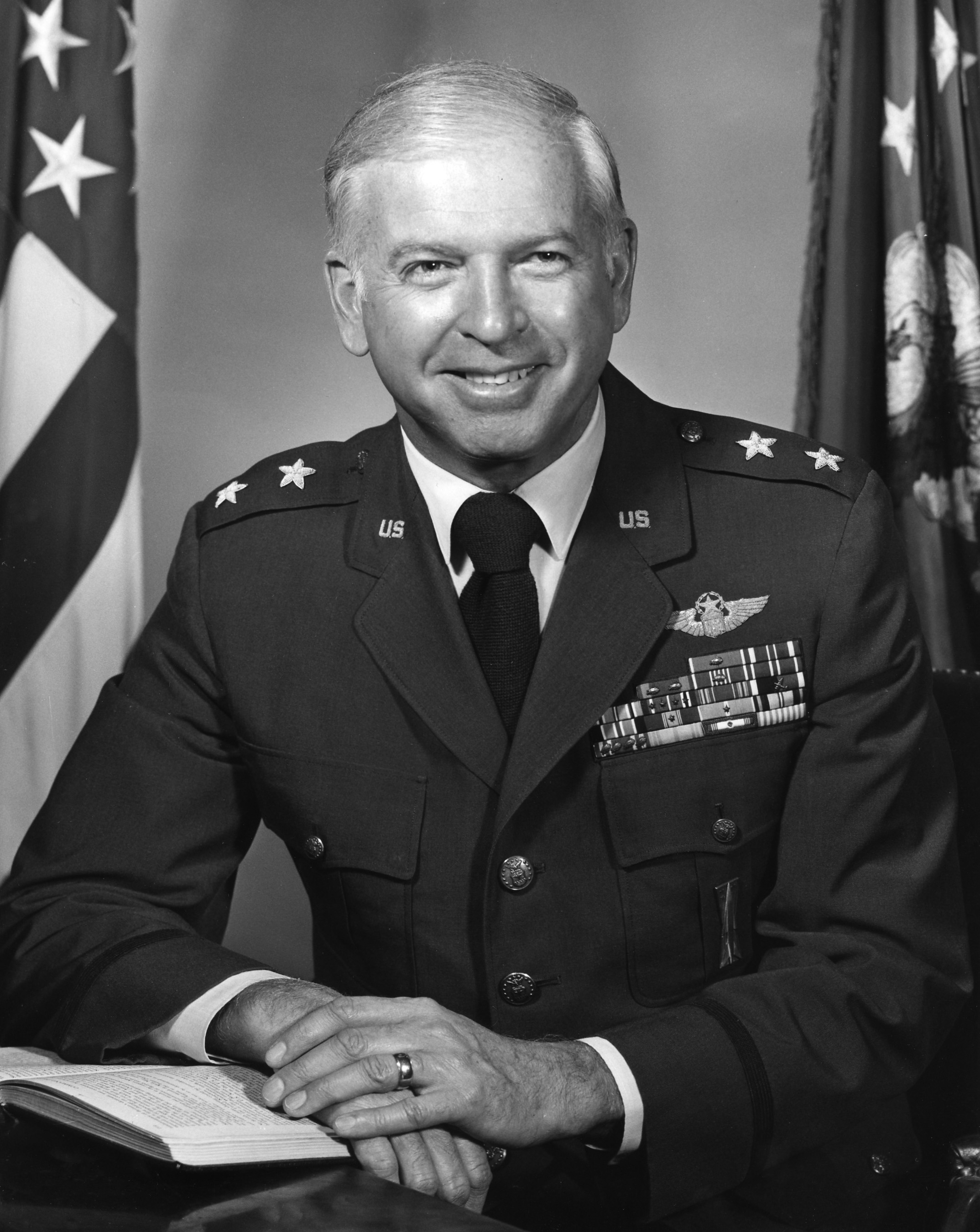
- Born: August 9, 1922; Indianapolis, Indiana
- Died: February 21, 2012 (aged 89); San Diego, California
- Military career
- Allegiance: United States of America
- Branch: United States Air Force
- Service years: 1942–1975
- Rank: Major general
- Commands: Special assistant to the chief of staff for B-1 Matters
- Awards: Distinguished Service Medal, Legion of Merit with oak leaf cluster, Distinguished Flying Cross, Air Medal with two oak leaf clusters, Army Commendation Medal with oak leaf cluster, Air Force Outstanding Unit Award Ribbon, and the Republic of Korea Presidential Unit Citation Ribbon

Harry Max Darmstandler (August 9, 1922 – February 21, 2012) was an American Air Force major general who was special assistant to the chief of staff for B-1 Matters, Headquarters, United States Air Force, Washington, D.C. In this capacity, he coordinated Air Force activities related to the B-1 bomber.

Darmstandler was born in Indianapolis, Indiana, in 1922, where he graduated from Arsenal Technical High School in 1940. He received a Bachelor of Science degree in military science from the University of Omaha, in 1964, and a Master of Science degree in international relations from The George Washington University, in 1965.

He entered the aviation cadet program in Santa Ana, California, in May 1942 and graduated at Luke Air Field, Arizona, as a pilot and second lieutenant in February 1943.

During World War II, Darmstandler served as an instructor pilot in the Air Training Command, and later as aircraft commander of a B-24 crew assigned to the 456th Bombardment Group in Italy. He flew 21 combat missions and remained in Italy after V-E Day through July 1945, flying gasoline and oil into Trieste. In September 1945 he separated from active duty, retaining a commission in the Army Air Corps Reserve.

In November 1948 Darmstandler returned to active duty to participate in the Berlin airlift. Assigned to the 29th Troop Carrier Squadron, he completed nearly 200 missions before returning to the United States in July 1949 to join the Air Proving Ground Command at Eglin Air Force Base, Fla. He then became a B-17 "director pilot" for Operation GREENHOUSE nuclear tests conducted at Eniwetok Atoll in early 1951. Following the test series, he joined the 61st Troop Carrier Group in Japan where he flew combat cargo missions in support of military operations in Korea. In November 1952 the 61st Group returned to the United States and transitioned into C-124 Globemaster aircraft with Darmstandler as the group chief pilot.

In February 1954 Darmstandler moved to Donaldson Air Force Base, South Carolina, where he served as operations and training inspector under the inspector general, Eighteenth Air Force. During the winter of 1955–1956, he staged at Frobisher Bay, flying into ice air strips on frozen lakes in Northern Canada in support of the installation of the Defense Early Warning (DEW) Line. In the academic year of 1955–1956, he attended Command and Staff School at the Naval War College, Newport, R.I. He then returned to the 61st Troop Carrier Group to command a rotational detachment of C-124 aircraft at Rhein-Main Air Base, Germany. During this tour of duty, he led the air evacuation of American nationals from Tel Aviv at the outbreak of the Arab-Israeli conflict of 1956, and participated in the airlift of the United Nations security forces from the Scandinavian countries to the Suez.

In July 1957 Darmstandler was assigned as aide and flag pilot to the commandant, Armed Forces Staff College, Norfolk, Virginia. In September 1960 he joined the staff of the commander in chief, Pacific, for a three-year tour. He next attended the University of Omaha under Operation BOOTSTRAP, and in August 1964 entered the National War College, during which time he also obtained a master's degree at The George Washington University.

In July 1965 Darmstandler was assigned to the Organization of the Joint Chiefs of Staff, serving initially in the North American Division and later in the Current Operations Branch of the Pacific Division. During this period, he served on temporary duty in the Republic of Vietnam, visiting all of the major Air Force, Army, and Marine Corps units in-country while analyzing the system for close air support.

In August 1968 Darmstandler was chosen to be a research fellow at the University of California, Los Angeles. In July 1969 he was assigned to Supreme Headquarters Allied Powers Europe as special assistant to the chief of staff and in June 1970 became executive to the chief of staff. In February 1972 he was assigned as commander, 12th Strategic Air Division, SAC, at Davis-Monthan Air Force Base, Arizona.

Darmstandler was reassigned as the assistant deputy chief of staff for plans, Strategic Air Command at Offutt Air Force Base, Nebraska, in March 1973, and became the deputy chief of staff for plans in September 1973. In this position, he directed the formulation and development of plans, policies, programs and requirements for SAC. He also served as the commander in chief, SAC, representative to the Joint Strategic Target Planning Staff for the Joint Chiefs of Staff.

Darmstandler assumed the position as special assistant to the chief of staff for B-1 Matters, U.S. Air Force, in July 1974.

His military decorations and awards include the Distinguished Service Medal, Legion of Merit with oak leaf cluster, Distinguished Flying Cross, Air Medal with two oak leaf clusters, Army Commendation Medal with oak leaf cluster, Air Force Outstanding Unit Award Ribbon, and the Republic of Korea Presidential Unit Citation Ribbon. He wears the Missileman Badge and is a command pilot with more than 7,000 flying hours.

He was promoted to the grade of major general effective September 1, 1973, with date of rank February 1, 1971. He retired September 1, 1975.

Darmstandler died in 2012. He was 89.
