= Tom Martinez =

American football coach (1946–2012)

Tom Martinez (February 21, 1946 – February 21, 2012) was an American football coach. He coached at the College of San Mateo until 2005, when he retired due to health concerns. He coached at the College of San Mateo after Bill Walsh and John Madden. The College of San Mateo Football program traditionally has a very high ranking team and draws players from all over the country. NFL alumni John Madden, of the Oakland Raiders and Bill Walsh, of the San Francisco 49ers both played and coached at the College of San Mateo early in their careers. Bill Walsh is claimed to be the best NFL coach ever and later retired from the 49ers to become the athletic director at Stanford University. (Ref. the College of San Mateo Football & Sports Hall of Fame websites for info on Martinez, Walsh, Madden and others). Prior to Martinez' death, he was inducted into the College of San Mateo Sports Hall of Fame. Many of his former College of San Mateo Football Players remember him as taking the approach of a military drill sergeant type to coaching at the college level. Martinez had a passion for conducted private coaching sessions with quarterbacks, (including Tom Brady) of all ages and from all around the country.

== Training career ==
With more than 1,400 career victories, Martinez was the most successful community college coach in the history of California and perhaps the nation. At College of San Mateo, he was head football coach for five years and offensive coordinator many years after. He was the 1995 California Community Coach of the Year, a member of the San Mateo Hall of Fame, and a member of the State Basketball Coaches Hall of Fame. He also holds numerous other honorary posts.

=== Tom Brady ===
New England Patriots quarterback Tom Brady considered Martinez his mentor and worked with him every off-season to clean up his mechanics.

=== JaMarcus Russell ===
Martinez also worked out JaMarcus Russell prior to the 2007 NFL draft. Martinez was interviewed by the Oakland Raiders as a candidate for their quarterbacks coach position. Martinez blames the Raiders' coaches for all but ruining Russell. "He was never wanted there by any of the coaches," Martinez told The New York Times. "The only one who wanted him there was Al Davis, he told them to draft him. He was the epitome of an Al Davis quarterback."

=== John Elway ===
He also coached John Elway.

=== Declining health ===
On June 12, 2011, Martinez announced on his Facebook page that he was given roughly one month to live due to diabetes and cancer. He was seeking an organ donor up until his death.

On January 27, 2012, Patriots' Tom Brady's efforts on MatchingDonors.com resulted in over 300 potential organ donors to step forward to be tested to see if they were a match to save Tom Martinez' life.

=== Death ===
On February 21, 2012, Martinez died after suffering a heart attack during dialysis on his 66th birthday.

Three weeks before his death Tom created the Tom Martinez Goal Line Fund www.TheTomMartinezGoalLineFund.com to help those people needing organ transplants through MatchingDonors.com. Tom said "I’m thrilled that even if I can’t be saved at least the donors and awareness we brought to MatchingDonors.com will save many other lives".

== Head coaching record ==
=== Football ===
Year	Team	Overall	Conference	Standing	Bowl/playoffs
San Mateo Bulldogs (Golden Gate Conference) (1984–1993)
1984	San Mateo	9–2	7–1	2nd	W Santa Cruz County Lions Bowl
1985	San Mateo	7–3	6–2	T–1st	
1986	San Mateo	3–7	1–5	T–6th	
1987	San Mateo	6–4	5–1	T–1st	
1988	San Mateo	6–4	4–2	3rd	
1989	San Mateo	3–7	1–5	T–5th	
1990	San Mateo	6–4	4–3	4th	
1991	San Mateo				
1992	San Mateo	5–5	4–3	T–3rd	
1993	San Mateo				
San Mateo Bulldogs (Coast Conference) (1994–1996)
1994	San Mateo	8–3	6–1 / 4–1	2nd (North)	W East County Bowl
1995	San Mateo	5–4–1	3–3–1 / 1–3–1	5th (North)	
1996	San Mateo	3–7	1–6 / 1–4	5th (North)	
San Mateo:					
Total:					
National championship Conference title Conference division title or championship game berth
