= Robert Lawless (anthropologist) =

Robert Lawless (October 4, 1937 – February 2, 2012) was an American cultural anthropologist. He did fieldwork in the Philippines, New York City, Haiti, and Florida. He received his PhD at New School for Social Research in 1975, his M.A. at University of the Philippines, Diliman in 1968, and his BSJ at Northwestern University in 1959. He was a professor of anthropology at the University of Florida, and most recently, at Wichita State University.
