= Takako Saito =

Japanese artist (1929–2025)

- 斉藤 陽子
- Born: Takako Saito; 16 January 1929; Fukui, Japan
- Died: 30 September 2025 (aged 96)
- Education: Child Psychology
- Known for: Visual Art, Artist's Multiples, Installation, Sculpture, Performance,
- Movement: Fluxus
- Website: www.takakosaito.com

Takako Saito (斉藤 陽子, Saitō Takako; 16 January 1929 – 30 September 2025) was a Japanese visual artist closely associated with Fluxus, the international collective of avant-garde artists that was active primarily in the 1960s and 1970s. Saito contributed a number of performances and artworks to the movement, which continue to be exhibited in Fluxus exhibitions to the present day. She was also deeply involved in the production of Fluxus edition works during the height of their output, and worked closely with George Maciunas.

Saito is best known for her special chess sets, which include Spice Chess, but her larger body of work focuses on crafting a variety of objects to be used in open-ended situations that create unexpected social relations. More recent exhibitions, such as the Museum für Gegenwartskunst Siegen's 2017-18 exhibition Takako Saito: You + Me, have focused on the way Saito uses a playful process-based approach focused on the making of objects to blend her artistic practice with the activities and chores of daily life. Despite the fact that this blended approach often results in ambiguous objects that sit between the experimental sentiments of fine art and the practical concerns of design, her works have been collected by major museums and public collections across Europe, the United States, and Japan. The majority of her exhibitions have been held in Europe, where she traveled to and lived from 1968 on, including during the later period of her life when she resided in Düsseldorf, Germany.

== Life and career ==
=== Early life and education ===
Saito was born in 1929 in Sabae-Shi, Fukui Province in Japan to a wealthy landholding family. As the second daughter among three siblings, she had a relatively free childhood for her position. In her middle school years, during WWII, she and her classmates were put to work in a factory that produced military parachutes. Saito's job was to spin threads into rolls, an activity that bears some resemblance to her later artmaking processes. After the war, the post-WWII land reforms enacted under the GHQ left her family with limited financial resources. When her father died in 1947, her mother became more rigid creating a rift between Saito and her family that would eventually lead her to live abroad.

In 1947, Saito's mother sent her to Tokyo to study psychology at the Japan Women's University, from which she graduated in 1950. She then took up a teaching post at a junior high school in 1951 where she remained until 1954. While teaching, in 1952 she became involved with the Sōzō Biiku (Sōbi), or the 'Creative Art Education' movement. Founded 1952 by Teijirō Kubo, the movement focused on encouraging free will through creative expression and experimentation. Through this movement Saito began studying various artistic media including oil painting, sculpture, printmaking, and watercolor. While attending a summer camp organized by the movement, Saito met Ay-O, an artist actively engaged in avant-garde groups in Japan, such as Demokurāto Bijutsuka Kyōkai (Democratic Artists Association). Through Ay-O, Saito learned about the avant-garde, first in Tokyo, and then, after he moved in 1958, in New York City.

Determined to live independently, Saito left for Hokkaidō in 1960 where she worked in construction for six months, but she soon realized her desire to continue making art. She moved back to Tokyo in 1961 where she explored artmaking more, but found the rigid hierarchies of the Japanese artists associations and arts institutions difficult to deal with as a self-taught member of Sobi. Intrigued by the reports being sent back by Ay-O, Saito also traveled to New York on a working visa in 1963, ostensibly to work as a designer for a textile wholesaler.

=== New York and Fluxus ===
Through Ay-O, Saito met George Maciunas in 1964, and intrigued by the communal activities of Fluxus, she began working with the group. During her time with Fluxus, Saito was deeply involved in the production of Fluxus editions, sometimes as Maciunas' only assistant. For self-trained Saito, this was an opportunity to learn new production techniques and practice her skills at handcrafts, contributing to her later artistic productions. Saito was also briefly involved in the communal Fluxus dinners Maciunas hoped to hold as part of the broader communal ideal of Fluxus. As Fluxus member Mieko Shiomi recalled:

After a while, Maciunas proposed having dinner together every evening. In his opinion, buying food for many was more economical than buying for one... He called it Flux Dinner Commune. So George, Paik, Takako, Shigeko and I started this part-time collective life. For the first few days, the men went shopping and the girls cooked. However we found it inconvenient, because George came back rather late from his office and then often didn't buy what we wanted to cook.... It didn't last long, because we got jobs at night. George was discouraged, but bravely said, "Well, work comes first, dinner second."

Although Saito remained a part of the Fluxus movement throughout the 1960s and '70s, for her it was only one means of exploring her artistic commitment. She further expanded her experience through classes at New York University in summer 1964, the Brooklyn Museum Art School from 1964 to 1966, and the Art Students League from 1966 to 1968, although these also served as justification for her continued visa.

=== Travels ===
Saito left New York in 1968, leading an itinerant lifestyle until 1979. During this time, Saito worked with George Brecht and Robert Filliou in France (1968–72); with Felipe Ehrenberg, David Mayor, and Martha Hellion at Beau Geste Press in England publishing artist's books (1973–75); and with Francesco Conz and Rosanna Chiessi in Italy, creating interactive installations and other works (1975–79). From 1979 to 1983, she taught at the University of Essen, and the income from this job allowed her to launch her own bookmaking venture, Noodle Editions. This came at a fortuitous time in the early 1980s when there was an increasing demand for Fluxus products.

Thus even after leaving New York, Saito continued her Fluxus connections, producing multi-media installations and sculptural work in collaboration with other Fluxus artists such as Robert Filliou, George Brecht, Dorothy Iannone, Gerhard Rühm, Ben Vautier, Dick Higgins, and Bob Watts. Saito contributed pieces to many Fluxus collaborations, including Fluxus 1 (1964) and the Flux Cabinet (1975–77). Saito also maintained contact with Maciunas throughout the 1970s, up until his death in 1978.

=== Düsseldorf ===
From 1978, Saito lived and worked in Düsseldorf. Her move to Dūsseldorf and initial housing in the caretaker's workshop of a student hostel directed by Fluxus collector Erik Andersch allowed her to begin working full-time as an artist. Her later pieces maintain the Fluxus ideal of eroding the boundaries between performer and viewer, but, as art historian Dieter Daniels argues, they play with the traditional idea of the dissolution of authorship by combining obvious craftsmanship of objects with an open-ended collaboration through the use and exchange of these objects. An example of such a work in a more formal exhibition setting is Saito's You + Me Shop:

Saito's You and Me Shop again includes the idea of exchange with the viewer and of collaborative artistic work. In a small shop resembling a market stall, the artist as sales woman offered an arranged selection of those small things or materials which she also used in her objects: dried onion skins, chestnuts, pieces of wood. Here, the interaction with the viewer started with the joint selection, placement and fixation of the offered items on paper plates. It ended with the handing over of the object to the respective participant.

Beyond the gallery setting, however, her practice extended to the entirety of her living situation. She handmade her clothing, furniture, and other items for daily use in her Düsseldorf studio, embodying in her daily life a concrete recognition of the labor and craft of living. Daniels notes that while her work is often compared to that of Marcel Duchamp, given Duchamp's focus on the readymade as an escape from labor and his claim for the right to be lazy, Saito comes across as more self-aware of the various forms that labor and craft can take and the relations this investment creates when objects are left available for open exchange.

Aside from solo exhibitions in Düsseldorf, Cologne, Fukui, New York, Kansas, Bremen, Kaunas, and Schwerin in later years, her work has been featured in Re-Imagining Asia at the House of World Cultures in Berlin in 2008 and in Fluxus retrospectives at Museum Ostwall in Dortmund, Germany in 2012–13; the Museum of Modern Art in New York in 2010; and the Tate Modern, London in 2008.

=== Death ===
Saito died on 30 September 2025, at the age of 96.

== Chess sets ==
Saito is perhaps best known for the various special chess sets she created over the years. These were often included in the Flux Boxes from 1964 onwards, sometimes in uncredited form, and were part of a Fluxus series of game variations of Chess.

George Maciunas was fascinated by Japanese craftsmanship and owned some Japanese boxes. He associated this craftsmanship with Japanese culture, and when he began working with Saito, he was so impressed with her craftmanship, in spite of her self-taught skills, that he asked her to contribute a series of disrupted chess sets to sell in his new Flux shop on Canal Street in Soho. Maciunas was so delighted by Spice Chess in particular that he "even took credit for it on occasion." Smell Chess was one of several sets by Saito that used identical vials as chess pieces, requiring users to identify pieces by the vial's contents, identifiable by the sense of smell rather than sight. These were initially produced as part of a Fluxkit in 1965. While many have noted the relation between Duchamp's interest in chess, art historian Claudia Mesch points out that many of the Fluxchess sets deny the zero-sum win-or-lose social dynamics of chess in which Duchamp was engaged, and thereby subvert the "masculinist cold war metaphors" of chess. In Saito's case, she argues this is accomplished by reorienting the experience of chess to combine the analytical with the sensorial. Art historian Natasha Lushetich further expands on this notion, pointing out that once several vials have been opened, "their smells fuse and hang in the air, creating an undifferentiated continuum that makes it next to impossible for the players to identify the pieces, let alone decide on the position they ought to occupy on the board." For Lushetich, the effect is to temporalize the experience of chess play and enhance the material sense of the physical set as well as the action of play. In so doing, she argues that players change their game play strategies and goals, thereby shifting the nature of the social interaction realized through the game set.

Aside from Spice Chess, Saito has produced numerous other chess sets that subvert usual gameplay rules including the following:

- Nut & Bolt Chess (1964)
- Grinder Chess (1965)
- Sound Chess (1965)
- Weight Chess (1965)
- Smell Chess (1965)
- Liquor Chess (1975)
- Book Chess (1980s)
- Spielkopf 12 (1987)
- Bauhaus Chess B (1989)
- Spiral Schach [weiß] (1989)
- Hut Schachspeil C (1999)
- Chess for Rats and Squirrels (2012)

== Solo exhibitions ==
Galery La Fenêtre, Nice, 1972

Galleria Multipla, Milan, 1975 and 1976

Other Books & So, De Appel, Amsterdam, 1978

Ruhr Universität, Essen, Germany, 1980

Objetkte, Bücher, Schachspiele, Modern Art Galerie, Vienna, 1981

Bücherausstelling, Galerie M. + R. Fricke, Düsseldorf, Germany, 1984

Takako Saito – performance, books and book objects, Galerie Hundertmark, Cologne, Germany, 1986

Takako Saito: Eine Japanerin in Düsseldorf, Objekte, Stadtmuseum, Düsseldorf, 1988

Games, The Emily Harvey Gallery, NY, 1990

0 + 0 + (-1) = my work, Fondazione Mudima, Milan, 1993

Takako's You and me shop, music shop, newspaper stand, FLUX scoops shop, Galeria Lara Vincy, Paris, 2003, 2009, 2010

Takako Saito – Viel Vergnügen, Kunsthalle Bremen, 2004

Game Fashion Show, Museo d'Arte Contemporanea di Villa Croce, Genoa, 2006

Bücher, Objekte, Schachspiele, Kleiner Raum Classing & Galerie Etage, Münster, Germany, 2007

Les jeux de 1988–1994 + x, Galerie Lara Vincy, Paris, France, 2009

Les Jeux de 1988–1994 / Les Jeux de 2004-2009 + You and Me, Galerie Lara Vincy, Paris, France, 2010

Play and Connect, Galerie van Gelder / AP, Amsterdam, NL, 2015-16

You + Me, Kelter-Kabinett / Staatliches Museum, Schwerin, Germany, 2016

Takako Saito: der Himmel klingelt, Buchgalerie Mergemeier, Düsseldorf, 2016

Takako Saito: You + Me, Museum für Gegenwartskunst, Siegen, 2017

Takako Saito, CAPC musée d'art contemporain de Bordeaux, 2019

Takako Saito, boa-basedonart gallery, Düsseldorf, 2021-2022

== Select group exhibitions ==
Box Show, NY, 1965

FLUXshoe, Exeter, England, 1973 (touring exhibition)

Fluxus, etc.: The Gilbert and Lila Silverman Collection, Contemporary Arts Museum, Houston, 1984

Marcel Duchamp und die Avantgarde seit 1950, Museum Ludwig, Cologne, 1988

Ubi Fluxus ibi motus, 1990/1962, Biennale di Venezia, Venice, 1990

De Bonnard à Baselitz – Dix ans d'enrichissement du cabinet des estampes 1978–1988, Bibliothèque nationale, Paris, 1992

En el espiritu de Fluxus, Fundacion Antoni Tapies, Barcelona, 1994

Dinge in der Kunst des XX. Jahrhunderts, Haus der Kunst, Munich, 2000

Fluxus und Freunde, Weserburg, Museum für moderne Kunst, Bremen, 2002

Una larga historia con muchos nudos Fluxus en Alemania: 1962 –1994, Museo Tamayo Arte Contemporáneo, Mexico City, 2004

Faites vos jeux! Kunst und Spiel seit Dada, Ausstellungen: Kunstmuseum Liechtenstein, Vaduz; Akademie der Künste, Berlin; Museum für Gegenwartskunst Siegen, 2005–06

Fluxus en Alemania, 1962–1994, Museo de Arte Latinoamericano de Buenos Aires, 2006–07

Re-Imagining Asia, Haus der Kulturen der Welt, Berlin, 2008

States of Flux, Tate Modern, 2008

Dissonances: Shigeko Kubota, Yayoi Kusama, Yoko Ono, Takako Saito, Mieko Shiomi, Atsuko Tanaka, Toyota Municipal Museum of Art, 2008

Soudain l'été Fluxus, Passage de Retz, Paris, Curator Bernard Blistène, 2009

Experimental Women in Flux, Museum of Modern Art, New York, 2010

FLUXUS Kunst für Alle!, Museum Ostwall, Dortmund, Germany, 2012–13

HANS IM GLÜCK – KUNST UND KAPITAL, Lehmbruck Museum, Duisburg, 2014

Making Music Modern: Design for Ear and Eye, Museum of Modern Art, NY, 2014–16

EHF Collection. Fluxus, Concept Art, Mail Art, Emily Harvey Foundation, NY, 2017

Das Loch, Künstlerhaus Bremen, Germany, 2016

== Major collections ==
Archivio Conz, Berlin

CAPC musée d'art contemporain de Bordeaux, France

Fondazione Bonotto, Vincenza, Italy

Musée d'art moderne et contemporain, Saint-Étienne Métropole, France

[mac] musée d'art contemporain, Montreal, Quebec

Musée d'arts de Nantes, France

Centre nationale des arts plastiques, Paris La Défense, France

Musée nationale d'art moderne - Centre Pompidou, Paris, France

Musée d'art modern et contemporain – Strasbourg, France

The British Museum, London, UK

The Museum of Modern Art, NY

MUMOK Wien, Austria

museum FLUXUS+, Potsdam, Germany

ZKM Center for Art and Media Karlsruhe, Germany

Kunstsammlung Maria und Walter Schnepel, Bremen, Germany

Detroit Institute of Arts (Gilbert B. and Lila Silverman Fluxus Collection), MI, US

Getty Research Institute (Archive of Emmett Williams), Los Angeles, US

Itami City Museum of Art, Hyogo Prefecture, Japan

The National Museum of Art Osaka, Japan

Whitney Museum of American Art, NY, US

Walker Art Center, Minneapolis, MN, US

Emily Harvey Foundation, NY, US

Archives of the Museu d'Art Contemporani de Barcelona, Spain

Collection of Artists' Books at Reed College, Portland, Oregon, US
