= Spice Chess =

Artwork by Takako Saito

Spice Chess, 1965 This example is in the Gilbert and Lila Silverman Fluxus Collection, Detroit, Michigan

Spice Chess is an artist's multiple by the Japanese artist Takako Saito, while she was resident in the United States. Originally manufactured winter 1964–65, and offered for sale March 1965, the work is one of a famous series of disrupted chess sets referred to as Fluxchess or Flux Chess, made for George Maciunas' Fluxshop at his Canal Street loft, SoHo, New York City and later through his Fluxus Mail-Order Warehouse.

"Takako Saito engaged with Duchamp's practice but also with masculinist cold war metaphors by taking up chess as a subject of [her] art. Saito's fluxchess works... question the primacy of vision to chess, along with notions of perception and in aesthetic experience more generally.... Her "Smell Chess," "Sound Chess" and "Weight Chess" reworked the game of chess so that players would be forced to hone non-visual perception, such as the olfactory sense, tactility, and aurality, in order to follow chess rules." Claudia Mesch

The set follows the normal rules of chess, but replaces the traditional pieces with identically shaped transparent plastic vials filled with different spices for each of the different pieces. The set includes white pawns made of cinnamon, white rooks of nutmeg, white knights of ginger, and the white queen is anise. The black bishops are cumin, the Black king is made of asafoetida, and the black queen is cayenne pepper. The board is also made of transparent plastic. To start the game, both players have to familiarise themselves with each of the 12 smells involved, instead of the more normal reliance on sight.

== Ay-O and George Maciunas ==
As a 'basically untrained' artist in Tokyo, Saito's opportunities to exhibit work were severely limited. After taking English lessons, Saito arrived in New York in 1963 on a work visa as an assistant textile wholesaler, 'vaguely [dreaming] of engaging herself in the unknown New York avant-garde'. Unaware of Fluxus, she concentrated on her own work for a few months before meeting George Maciunas through a mutual friend, Ay-O. An admirer of Japanese art, Maciunas asked Saito if she could make boxes similar to the Paulownia boxes he owned, which had been made to protect expensive ceramics. Her skill exceeded expectations, leading him to write that 'her craftmanship springs from Japanese tradition for perfection and is unmatched among contemporary artists working in wood and paper.'

Grinder Chess, 1965 This example Reflux Edition, 1990

=== Fluxchess ===
Maciunas revered Marcel Duchamp, and 'found it amusing that both Duchamp and he were chess fanatics.' As a homage to Duchamp's assertion that 'all chess players are artists', Maciunas asked Saito to create a series of artworks based on chess in late 1964. The series she created relegated or removed the dominant visual aspect of the game, replacing it with sets that relied upon the honing of other senses to play.

'In Saito's chess, strategy is undermined by the physical need to utilize the five senses...by involving senses that were normally unrelated to the traditional game, Saito transformed the ultimate conceptual game into a play of sensuous interactions.'

As well as Spice Chess, the series includes Sound Chess (different objects hidden in identical sealed boxes), Grinder Chess (a series of tactile drill bit polishers), Weight Chess (different weights hidden in sealed boxes), Nut & Bolt Chess, Jewel Chess, (made from different fake jewels) and Smell Chess (different liquids in vials). All of these sets were advertised for sale in Maciunas' Fluxus shop in SoHo, March 1965.

"When I gave all the chess sets to George, I said, 'he can use them as fluxus chess without mentioning my name." Takako Saito

Maciunas was said to be so delighted by Spice Chess that he 'even took credit for it on occasion.'

=== Later Fluxchess sets and Yoko Ono's White Chess Set ===
Other Fluxchess sets were made by Maciunas (Color Balls in Bottle Board Chess, March 1966 and Time Chess made of sand timers, May 1966) and by Yoko Ono, (Pieces Hidden In Look-a-Like Containers intended for the Fluxfest April 1970 Saito added Chess Board Door to the series in 1973, in which a chess board was to be attached to a toilet door allowing for a game to continue whilst one of the players was on the loo, and Liquor Chess, 1975 (see ) in which players have to taste various different drinks to ascertain each piece's value. Wine Chess and Book Chess have been added to the series since Maciunas' death.

The most famous of these disrupted sets, Yoko Ono's White Chess Set (see Yoko Ono's Myspace ), in which all the pieces are white on a totally white board (with a brass plaque underneath reading 'Chess Set for playing as long as you can remember where all your pieces are') was originally made for Ono's exhibition at Indica Gallery, London, 1966, and was never produced as a Fluxus edition.

"Yoko Ono's White Chess Set, in which the opponents' pieces, all white, sit on each side of an all-white board, [make] the warring factions indistinguishable from one another. This elegantly placed anti-war statement, particularly taken in the context of the Vietnam War...[draws] attention to the deeply militaristic metaphors embedded in... games by conscientiously objecting to their implicit narratives of combat and enmity."

The piece has been reconfigured a number of times, including an edition of 20 produced by Bag Productions, UK, 1970, and as Play It By Trust, a white table with ten sets and twenty white chairs laid out at the Vrej Baghoomian Gallery, New York, 1991.

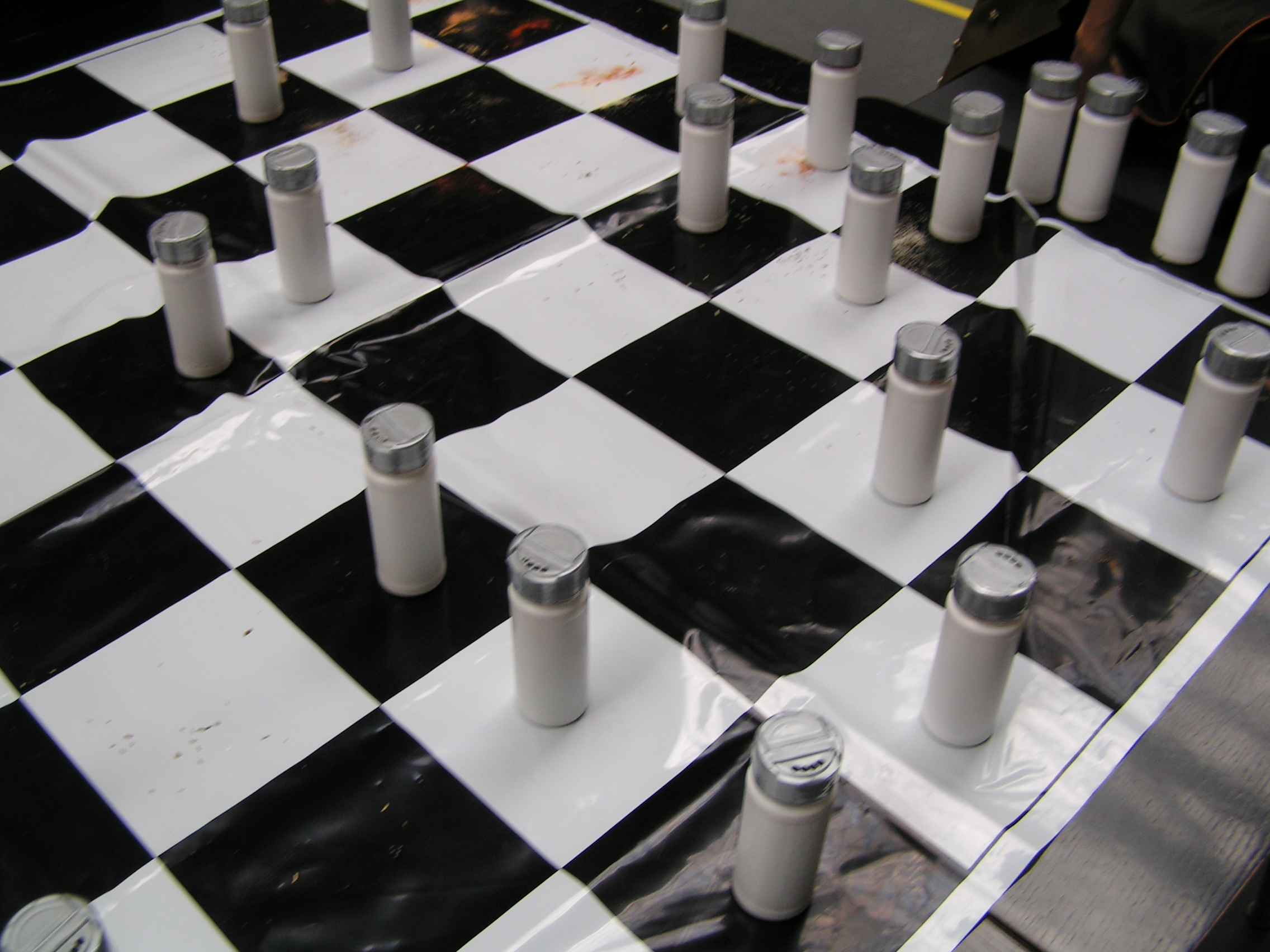
Smell Chess being played at Tate Modern, May 2008

=== Editions ===
The sets were originally sold through Maciunas' newly opened Fluxshop in unsigned, unattributed and unnumbered editions. At least one set, Grinder Chess, was remade in an edition of 19 signed and numbered in 1990 as part of the Reflux editions series.

Before Hendrick's seminal Fluxus Codex was published in 1989, there was a general confusion concerning dates and authorship of the key Fluxus pieces, since few were ever sold, and even fewer were signed or dated. Saito's place within the group has gradually become more established, and the playing of Fluxchess has become an integral part of a number of recent Fluxus exhibitions. An original example of Spice Chess is one of a number of Fluxchess sets held in the Gilbert and Lila Silverman Fluxus Collection, Detroit, Michigan.
