= Matria =

Matria may refer to:

- Matria (2014 film), a Mexican documentary
- Matria (2023 film), a Spanish drama
- Matria Hospital, Calicut, Kerala, India
