= Opal Louis Nations =

Music historian

Opal Louis Nations (born 1941) is a British-American-Canadian writer, music historian, critic, record producer, musician and visual artist from Brighton, England.

== Recordings ==
In the 1960s Nations was the lead singer with Decca recording artists The Frays. The group is best known for its cover version of Jerry Butler & The Impressions' hit "For Your Precious Love". The session featured Nicky Hopkins on piano and John McLaughlin on guitar.

Nations also sang in Alexis Korner's short-lived gospel quartet and opened as a soloist for Wilson Pickett at the Flamingo Club in London in 1965 on Pickett's first tour of the U.K. He made guest appearances on the Long John Baldry Show at London's Marquee Club.

Nations recorded for Decca in 1966 as a solo artist under the moniker Martin Hummingbird. He was backed by a female vocal group and a full orchestra at Decca's Soho Studios.

== Artist and writer collaborations ==
In the early 1970s Nations collaborated with Genesis P-Orridge. They formed the Global Infantilist Movement and designed a passport that allowed babies to travel anywhere in the world. At public events, they gave out pacifier prizes to the cutest babies.

Nations collaborated with artists such as Felipe Ehrenberg and Robert Amos, and poet David Bromige and writer and artist Allen Fisher.

== Publications ==
Nations is the author of more than 600 short works of fiction and criticism published in journals and publications such as

- Center Magazine (Carol Bergé, editor - Woodstock, New York, United States)
- 8 x 10 Art Portfolio (Jeanie Black, editor - New York, United States)
- Assembling (Richard Kostelanetz, editor - New York, United States)
- Fluxshoe (David Mayor, editor - Devon, England)
- The Kenyon Review (Ohio, United States)
- Poetry Review (London, England)
- Rampike Magazine (Carl Jirgens, editor – Ontario, Canada)
- Schmuck Magazine (David Mayor, editor – Devon, England)
- Smith Magazine (John Smith, editor – New York, United States)
- Telephone Magazine (Maureen Owen, editor – New York, United States)
- Vile Magazine (Anna Banana, editor – San Francisco, California, United States)
- Wormwood Review (Marvin Malone, editor – Stockton, California, United States)

Nations is the author of more than 60 books of experimental fiction and artwork. His first published work, an experimental piece inspired by William S. Burroughs, appeared in 1969 in Michael Moorcock's New Worlds science fiction magazine in England.

=== Selected books ===
- The Man Who Entered Pictures – Beau Geste Press, Devon, England, 1972
- Sitting on the Lawn with a Lady Twice My Size – Intermedia Press, Vancouver, British Columbia, Canada, 1976
- The Browser's Opal L. Nations – Coach House Press, Toronto, Ontario, Canada, 1981
- A Cornucopia – Teksteditions, Toronto, Ontario, Canada, 2012

Between the years of 1970 and 1980 Nations was the editor of Strange Faeces, a journal of experimental fiction, poetry and artwork that ran for 20 issues featuring works of John Giorno, Ron Padgett, Joe Brainard, Anne Waldman, Bernadette Mayer, Larry Fagin, Clark Coolidge, Andrei Codrescu, Keith Abbott, Glen Baxter and David Mayor. Strange Faeces also published translations of French writers such as Tristan Tzara, Paul Eluard, and Rene Char, among others.

=== Liner notes and special collections ===
Nations has worked extensively on the history of Gospel Music and Rhythm and Blues. He is the author of over 130 sets of liner notes including:

- There Will Be No Sweeter Sound (Various Artists) - Columbia Records, 1997
- Testify! The Gospel Box (Various Artists) - Rhino Records, 1999
- Faith And Grace: A Family Journey 1953-1976 (The Staple Singers) - Stax, 2015

Nations is the author of Sensational Nightingales: The Story of Joseph “Jo Jo’ Wallace And the Early Days of the Sensational Nightingales, published by Black Scat Books in 2013.

Many of his manuscripts are housed in the Opal Louis Nations Collection in the Archives of African American Music and Culture at Indiana University in the United States.

The Opal Louis Nations Black Gospel Collection of musical recordings, books and photographs were donated to Baylor University in Waco, Texas on September 1, 2023 to become part of The Black Gospel Music Preservation Project.

Nations is a regular feature writer for the British magazine, Blues & Rhythm, with articles on blues and gospel artists such as Chick Willis, Wynona Carr, Johnny Heartsman, Linda Hopkins, The Staple Singers and Wings Over Jordan Choir.

== As subject ==
He is the co-producer and appears in the music documentary How They Got Over: Gospel Quartets and the Road to Rock and Roll directed by Robert Clem in 2013.

In 2013 Nations was extensively interviewed for the German television documentary Soul Power.

=== Radio ===
Nations hosted weekly R&B and world music shows on KPFA in Berkeley, California, United States for 14 years, and also hosted and did numerous appearances on KUSP in Santa Cruz, KPOO and KALW in San Francisco.

=== Articles about Opal Louis Nations ===
- The Strange Case of Opal Nations by George Myers Jr. from The Collected Essays And Reviews, Lunchroom Press, 1982
- Veteran Producer Opal Nations’ Archivist Work by Lee Hildebrand – San Francisco Chronicle, August 28, 2008
- One-On-One: An Interview With Opal Louis Nations in Liner Notes issue 20, 2015-2016, Archives of African American Music And Culture, Indiana University

=== Awards and nominations ===
- In the 1970s, Nations was awarded The Pushcart Prize for his fiction, The U.S. Chinese Book of the Art of Sex, Parts 1 & 2.

== Personal life ==
Nations married Ellen Nations in 1970. They live in Oakland, California in the United States.
