= Mesch (surname) =

Mesch is a surname. Notable people with the surname include:

- Claudia Mesch, American art historian and critic
- Rachel Mesch, American scholar, academic, and writer
