= Opal (given name) =

Female given name

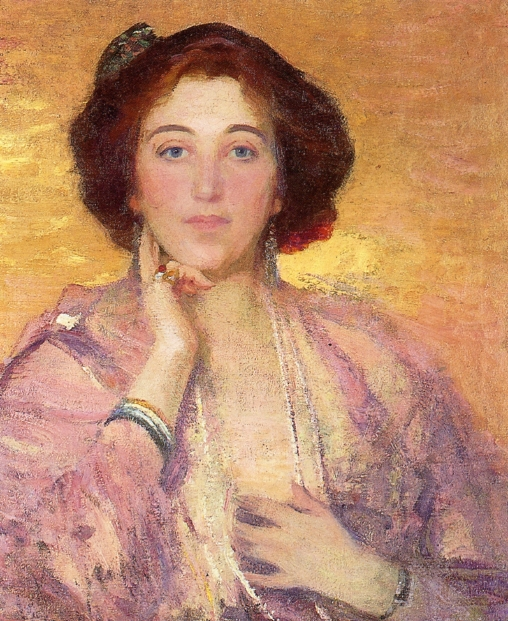
- Fire Opal by Robert Vonnoh.
- Pronunciation: English: /ˈoʊpəl/ or English: /ˈoʊpəl/
- Gender: unisex (Primarily female)

Origin
- Origin: Sanskrit
- Meaning: "opal"

Other names
- Related names: Opaline

Opal is a primarily feminine given name derived from the name of the gemstone opal. The gemstone is the birthstone for October. Its name is derived from the Sanskrit upala (उपल), which means 'jewel'. It came into use along with other gemstone names during the late Victorian era. The iridescent, many-colored gem was called the "queen of gems" in ancient Rome. The name has recently increased in usage, a trend that has been attributed to a renewed interest in "cottagecore names" with a vintage sensibility that are rooted in the natural world. Author Laura Wattenberg calls the sound of the name unique.

Opal was among the 100 most popular names for girls born in the United States from 1904 to 1919 and remained among the top 500 most popular names for girls there until 1950. It declined in popularity but has again increased in usage. It has been among the 1,000 most popular names for American girls since 2017. It was the 344th most common name for females in the United States in the 1990 census. It has ranked among the 1,000 most popular names for girls in England and Wales since 2022.

== Women ==
- Opal Palmer Adisa (born 1954), Jamaica-born award-winning poet, novelist, performance artist and educator.
- Opal Wilcox Barron (1914–2010), First Lady of West Virginia from 1961 to 1965
- Opal Carew, pen name of Canadian erotic romance novelist Elizabeth Batten-Carew
- Opal Curless (born 1998), American soccer player
- Opal Hill (1892–1981), American professional golfer
- Opal Kunz (1894–1969), American aviator
- Opal Lee (born 1926), American retired teacher, counselor, and activist in the movement to make Juneteenth a federally-recognized holiday in the United States
- Opal J. Moore (born 1953), African-American poet, short-story author, and professor
- Sara Opal Search (1890–1961), American composer
- Opal Sofer (born 1997), Israeli professional footballer
- Opal Suchata (born 2003), Thai model
- Opal Whiteley (1897–1992), American nature writer and diarist

== Men ==
- Opie Cates (1909–1984), American clarinet player
- Opal Cooper (1889–1974), African-American actor and singer
- Opal Courtney, Jr., Member musical group The Spaniels
- Opal Louis Nations (born 1941), British-American-Canadian writer, music historian, critic, record producer, musician and visual artist

== Fictional characters ==
- Opal Mehta, title character of Kaavya Viswanathan's controversial debut novel How Opal Mehta Got Kissed, Got Wild, and Got a Life
- Opal Tanaka, Marvel Comics character and ex-girlfriend of Iceman
