= Fernando Llanos =

Mexican writer and musician

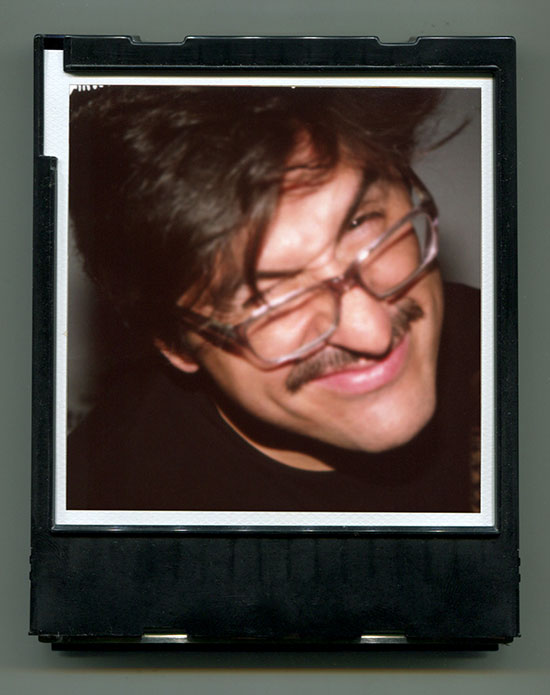
Fernando Llanos

Fernando Llanos (Mexico City, 1974) is a Mexican artist, writer, curator, producer, musician, and teacher. He works experimental art mainly with drawing and video and in the recent years he is focused on cinematography.

He is considered an active contemporary Mexican artists and is a reference in Latin American video artistic making. His work has been presented in places such as Guggenheim Museum, the Festival du nouveau cinéma in Montreal, the World Wide Video Festival in Amsterdam, Transmediale in Berlin, among others.

== Bio ==
He was born in the Hospital de México in Colonia Escandón, but lived in Valle Dorado, State of Mexico until he was nine years old. Later she lived in Morelia until he was nineteen years old, and from there he traveled to study graphic arts for a year in Florence. He returned to live in Mexico City, from where he has been producing ever since. He completed a degree in Art, with a video specialization at Escuela Nacional de Pintura, Escultura y Grabado "La Esmeralda". From an early age, his artistic work has moved between video creation, mail art, video action, performance and drawing.

In 2000 he made the "Videomails" project, which consisted of sending weekly, every Tuesday, for a year, artistic videos by e-mail to whoever subscribed. Llanos reached 1,600 subscribers, and with these videos he created in collaboration with Arcángel Constantini the first website of a video artist in Latin America: www.fllanos.com

In 2001 he began to develop a mobile video intervention project in specific urban contexts, called Videoman. This project has traveled through Mexico, South America and Europe. Llanos moves his career between curatorial, artistic and teaching activities. He was the founder and director of the Animasivo contemporary animation forum for the Festival de México (2008-2011). He has curated and disseminated more than 15 video curatorships both in Mexico and abroad. He was the curator of the Felipe Ehrenberg retrospective, "Manchuria" which was presented in Mexico and some countries as United States and Brazil.

In 2008, he formed Ediciones Necias publishing house from where he gives an outlet to his concerns about paper where he published Rinostalgias, which was presented at the Museo de Arte Moderno on April 5, 2014. At the same time he has created the musical project Mi Reyna since 2008 with which he has released 2 albums: "La realeza se mama" and "Venga a nosotros Mi Reyna". Since 2010 he made his first documentary feature film "Matria", which was released in 2016.

== Works ==
=== Films ===
==== Documentary ====
- Matria (2016)

==== Short film ====
- Pixel y dinamita (2020)

==== In DVD ====
- Conciencia Concéntrica, 2005
- Animasivo 1, 2008
- Animasivo 2, 2009
- La Cooperativa de arte en video, 2009
- Animasivo 3, 2010

=== Short videos ===
- RPM, 1998
- VIDEOMAILS, 2010
- Making of “Amores Perros”, 2000
- Yo oy (Joy) 1998
- Tradición, 1998
- KIF KIF, 1998
- c.a.r.a.c.a.s., 1998
- El apoYOcabeza, 2000
- Serie “Videoviajes” 2000
- Serie “Memory full / Memory fool”, 2003
- Barras libres, 2002
- Transmitiendo trazos, 2003
- CITtA, 2004
- amor es, 2004
- vi_video, 2005
- Preguntas sobre pixel, 2006
- La muerte de Videoman, 2010
- Mónica, 2012

=== Books ===
- Cursiagridulce. Trilce. 2006. p. 320. ISBN 968-6842-94-2.
- Handmade - 2003
- Preguntas - 2009
- Manchuria (Diamantina) - 2008
- Satélite, el libro (UAM) - 2012
- Videoman (Ediciones Necias) - 2008
- Venga a nosotros Mi Reyna (Ediciones Periféricas y Ediciones Necias)- 2013
- Ministructivo (Ediciones Necias) - 2011
- Espejulacciones, en colaboración con Felipe Ehrenberg - 2011
- Calendario (Ediciones Necias) - 2012
- Apuntes (Ediciones Necias) - 2013
- Calendario 2013 (Lilit)
- Adentro (Ediciones Necias) - 2013
- Rinostalgias (Proyecto Literal y Ediciones Necias) - 2014

== Prizes and awards ==
- Member of Sistema Nacional de Creadores de Arte of the FONCA since 2010.
- Jóvenes Creadores Scholarship from Fondo Nacional para la Cultura y las Artes de México
- Best Documentary Award by Morelia International Film Festival, 2014 to his documentary Matria
- Diosa de Plata for Best Documentary, PECIME, 2015 to his documentary Matria
