= Claudia Mesch =

Art historian

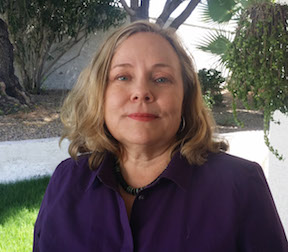
- Mesch in 2016
- Born: Ulrike Claudia Mesch

Academic work
- Discipline: Art History; Visual Culture
- Institutions: Arizona State University

Claudia Mesch is an American art historian and critic who writes on developments in 20th-century and contemporary art and film. She is author of Joseph Beuys: The Reader; Modern Art at the Berlin Wall: Demarcating Culture in the Cold War Germanys; Art and Politics: a Small History of Art for Social Change since 1945; and the artist biography Joseph Beuys. Some of these titles have appeared in Chinese, French, Spanish and Italian translation. She is a recognized authority on visual culture after 1945.

== Education and career ==
Mesch was born in Chicago, Illinois. She attended Yale College, receiving a B.A. in Germanic Literature in 1982. Upon graduation she was awarded a Fulbright-Hayes grant and traveled throughout Europe, visiting cities in the German Democratic Republic. A student of the modernist art historian Albert Boime and film theorist Peter Wollen (University of California at Los Angeles, M.A. 1990), she completed a doctorate in art history in 1997 from the University of Chicago. She is professor of art history at Arizona State University.

== Art history ==
Mesch's books and essays examine modern art's transnational cultural exchanges across disciplinary and other borders, with a focus on German modernism. More generally she has examined art's global engagement with politics, with games and game classification, and with the occult sciences.

An expert on the work of West German artist Joseph Beuys, she has published a biography of the artist (2017) and co-edited the critical anthology Joseph Beuys: The Reader (2007). Mesch has furthermore explored Beuys' investigations of the material of lead (2021) as well as his development of the vitrine as sculptural practice (2013).

Mesch published one of the earliest post-reunification reappraisals of German-German art during the Cold War era in English language. Modern Art at the Berlin Wall: Demarcating Culture in the Cold War Germanys (2008) forwards the progressive notion that art in the former GDR merits art historical analysis. Mesch argues that despite the state policies that policed transnational exchange, the art histories of the two Germanys remained deeply entwined during the Cold War, since key cultural and artistic developments in the GDR continued to impact the artscene in the Federal Republic of Germany, and vice versa. Among the cultural developments Mesch discusses are the numerous emigrations or defections of GDR artist-exiles to the Federal Republic which marked the era, and which included Gerhard Richter, who would become the most renowned German painter of the late-20th century, as well as figures such as Georg Baselitz, Sigmar Polke and Eugen Schönebeck.

Another prominent Cold War development is the commitment to socialism and the institutional critique pursued by a contingent of students at the Düsseldorf Art Academy, most directly Chris Reinecke and Jörg Immendorff, and the latter's secret transborder artistic exchanges with GDR artist A.R. Penck (Ralf Winkler). The book traces lesser-known GDR artists and the international roster of West-Berlin based artists who critiqued the state and the rise of corporate culture: Manfred Butzmann, Erhard Monden, the Clara Mosch group, Willi Sitte, and Wolfgang Mattheuer in the GDR; and in artworks beginning in the 1960s in West Berlin by artists Stanley Brouwn, Wolf Vostell, Beuys, K.P. Brehmer, Carolee Schneemann, Yvonne Rainer, Ed Kienholz, Allan Kaprow, and, emerging around 1980, the art group/artists’ space Büro Berlin featuring work by Katja Ka (Katja Hajek), Una H. Moehrke, Hermann Pitz, Res Ingold, Raimund Kummer and Fritz Rahmann, among others.

Her book Art and Politics: a Small History of Art for Social Change since 1945 (2013) foregrounds global modern and postmodern artists who have been marginalized in art history because of their distinct political positions—in terms of notions of postcolonial, feminist and queer equality, environmentalism and anti-globalization. She is also contributing editor of the college textbook Western Art History From the Renaissance to the Present: a Thematic Approach (Cognella Inc., 2026).

Other essays have considered the figure of Ulrike Meinhof and postwar feminism as analyzed in Yvonne Rainer's film Journeys from Berlin/1971 (1979); and the Surrealists' historical exploration of games as a path to collectivity, and of the occult as an alternative historiography of visual art and culture.

As an art and film critic, her review of the 1998 Tom Tykwer film Lola Rennt (Run Lola Run) is among her most cited. Patricia Kelly, writing for the caa.reviews Centennial project, has distinguished Mesch's multi-book review “Rethinking Conceptual Art” (2002) as one of the most consulted in the history of that publication. A recent focus of her critical writing is Indigenous modern art's critical engagement with politics.

With art historians Amy Winter and Samantha Kavky, Mesch is a founding editor of the open access e-journal Journal of Surrealism and the Americas which began publication in 2007. The JSA has published English translations of primary and secondary texts relating to Surrealism in the Americas, and, new research in the field by Marie Mauzé, Graciela Speranza, Katharine Conley, David Craven, Ian Walker, Jonathan Eburne, W. Jackson Rushing III, Charlotte Townsend-Gault, Carlos Segoviano, Michele Greet, and Paulina Caro Troncoso, among others.

== Selected works ==
=== Books ===
- Claudia Mesch, Samantha Kavky, Karen L Carter (2026). Western Art History From the Renaissance to the Present: a Thematic Approach. San Diego, CA: Cognella Academic Publishing. ISBN 979-8-8233-9698-1.
- Joseph Beuys. London: Reaktion Books. 2017. ISBN 978-1-78023-782-4. OCLC 956626286. Chinese edition: Icons, Beijing. 2024. ISBN 978-7-5321-8446-0. Italian edition: postmedia books, Milan. 2024. ISBN 978-88-7490-390-0.
- Art and Politics : a Small History of Art for Social Change since 1945. London: I.B. Tauris. 2013. ISBN 978-1-84885-110-8. LCCN 2012276238. OCLC 857270360.
- Modern Art at the Berlin Wall: Demarcating Culture in the Cold War Germanys. London: I.B. Tauris. 2008. ISBN 978-1-4416-2896-1. LCCN 2009284539. OCLC 472100422.
- Mesch, Claudia; Michely, Viola (2007). Joseph Beuys: the Reader. Cambridge, MA: MIT Press. ISBN 978-0-262-63351-2. OCLC 86038434.

=== Chapters and articles ===
- Bauduin, Tessel M., ed. (2025). "12. 'The Tarot in André Breton's L'Art magique". Surrealism and the Tarot: A Love Story. Fulgur Press. pp. 112–121.
- Mavridorakis, Valérie; Streitberger, Alexander, eds. (2025). "10. 'Charles W. White in East Berlin: Progressive Art History and the Limits of Socialist Solidarity in the German Democratic Republic, 1951-1978". Entangled Art Histories: The United States and the Two Germanies, 1960-1990. Universitaire Pers Leuven. pp. 183–196. ISBN 9789462704770.
- "Game-Based Learning in the Introductory Art History Course: Weaving Historical Contexts and Incentivizing Critical Looking" (PDF). AMPS Proceedings Series 28:1, A Focus on Pedagogy: Teaching, Learning and Research in the Modern Academy: 230–239. 2023.
- Bottinelli, Silvia; Hecker, Sharon, eds. (2021). "9. 'Mankind needs some lead so as to be somewhat heavier': Beuys, Alchemy, and Duchamp". Lead in Modern and Contemporary Art. Bloomsbury Press. pp. 139–160. ISBN 978-1-350-19644-5.
- Mesch, Claudia (Spring 2015). "Shadows of the Colonial: David Hare, Empathetic Perception and Ethnographic Surrealism in the 1940s". South Central Review. 32 (1): 76–95. doi:10.1353/scr.2015.0000. JSTOR 44016879.
- Welchman, John, ed. (2013). "'Sculpture in Fog': Beuys' Vitrines". Sculpture and Vitrine. Ashgate and The Henry Moore Institute. pp. 121–142.
- "'What Makes Indians Laugh': Surrealism, Ritual and Return in Steven Yazzie and Joseph Beuys". Journal of Surrealism of the Americas. 6 (1). July 8, 2012.
- Broadbent, Philip; Jake, Sabine, eds. (2010). "12: Berlin and Post-Meinhof Feminism: Yvonne Rainer's Journeys from Berlin/1971". Berlin Divided City, 1945-1989. New York: Berghahn Books. doi:10.1515/9781845456573-015.
- "Cold War Games and Postwar Art". Reconstruction: Studies in Contemporary Culture. 6 (1). Winter 2006.
- "Serious Play: Games and Early Twentieth-Century Modernism". The Space Between. 1. 2006. ISSN 1551-9309.
- Mesch, Claudia (March 2000). "Vostell's Ruins: dé-collage and the mnemotechnic space of the postwar city". Art History. 23 (1): 88–115. doi:10.1111/1467-8365.00196. S2CID 191570128.

=== Criticism ===
- "Exhibition Review: 'Native American Art at Documenta 14 and the Issue of Democracy'" (PDF). Journal of Surrealism and the Americas. 10 (1): 115–120. 2019.
- "Probing the Body Politic: limits, memory and anxiety in art after democracy can no longer be assumed / Ausculter le corps politique : la situation de l'art à une époque où la démocratie n'est plus acquise" (PDF). Esse arts + opinions. 92: 32–41. Winter 2018. eISSN 1929-3577. ISSN 0831-859X.
- Trauma and Democracy in Recent Political Art (PDF). Midwest Art History Conference. Indianapolis. April 2018.
- "Review of Boris Groys, The Communist Postscript (Verso, 2010)". Theory, Culture & Society. 28 (3): 162–164. June 2011. doi:10.1177/0263276410396906.
- "Review of Heike Fuhlbrügge, Joseph Beuys und die anthropologische Landschaft (Reimer Verlag, 2008)". Journal für Kunstgeschichte. 12 (4): 307–311. 2008.
- "Thinking the 'Post-Indian': Remix: New Modernities in a Post-Indian World" (PDF). The Journal of Surrealism and the Americas. 2 (1): 157–161. 2008.
- Mesch, Claudia (August 2007). "'Ezra Pound is back': Klaus Ottmann's SITE Santa Fe Biennial". The Art Book. 14 (3): 65–66. doi:10.1111/j.1467-8357.2007.00852.x.
- "Review of "New Art in the 60s and 70s: Redefining Reality" by Anne Rorimer and "Rewriting Conceptual Art" by Michael Newman and Jon Bird". College Art Association. Summer 2002.
- Mesch, Claudia (1 June 2000). "Racing Berlin: The Games of Run Lola Run". M/C Journal. 3 (3). doi:10.5204/mcj.1845.
