= Matria (2014 film) =

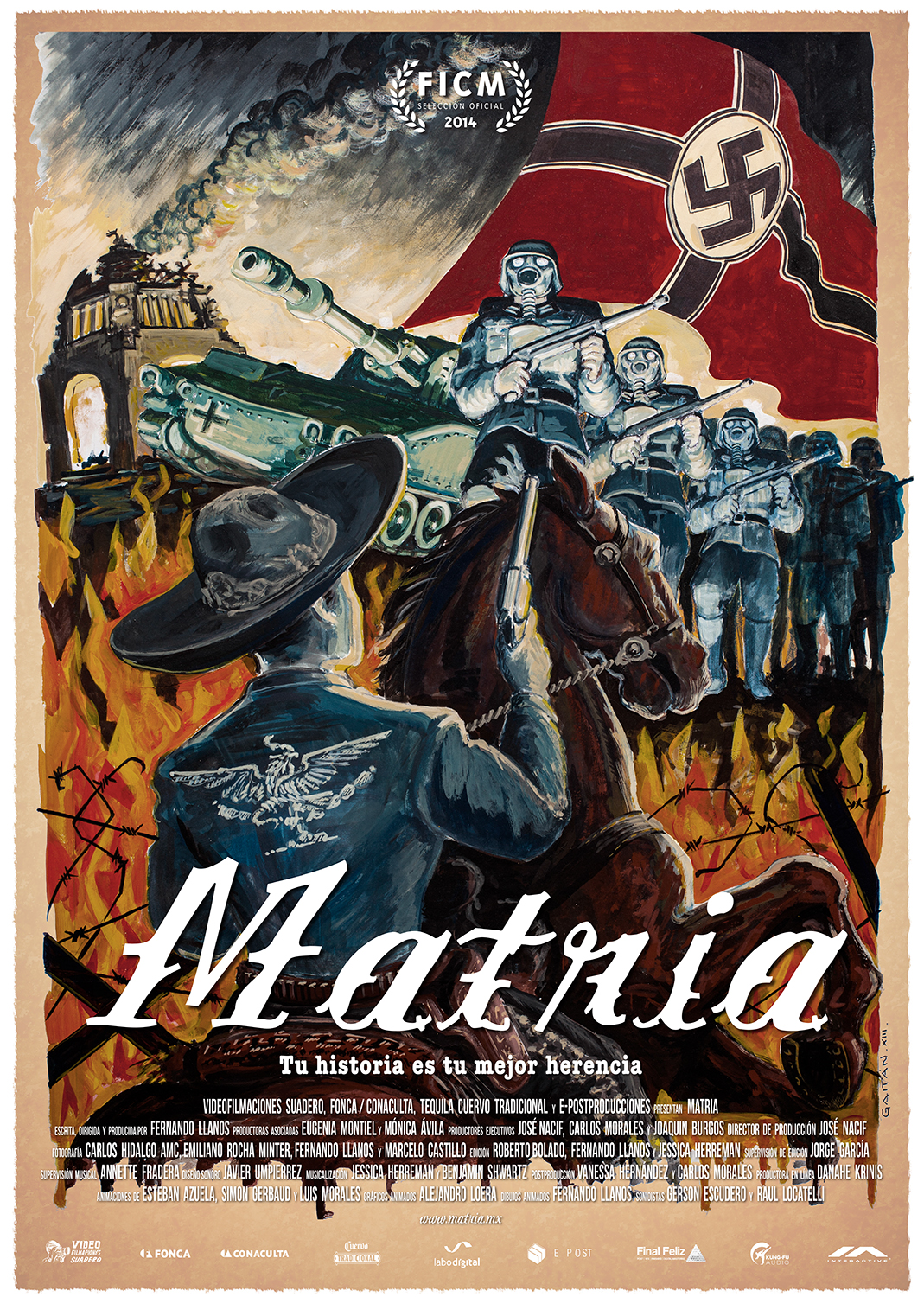
- Poster of the movie
- Directed by: Fernando Llanos
- Written by: Fernando Llanos
- Produced by: Eugenia Montiel, Mónica Avila, Danahe Krinis, José Nacif, Carlos Morales, Joaquín Burgos
- Starring: Antolín Jiménez Garza, Fernando Llanos
- Narrated by: Fernando Llanos
- Cinematography: Carlos Hidalgo, Emiliano Rocha Minter, Fernando Llanos, Marcelo Castillo
- Edited by: Roberto Bolado, Fernando Llanos, Jessica Herreman
- Music by: Juan Cirerol, Mi Reyna, Valentina, Lila Downs, Osiris Caballero, Omar Landa, Benjamin Shwartz, Jessica Herreman
- Release date: 2014
- Country: Mexico
- Language: Spanish

Matria is a 2014 Mexican documentary written, screened and directed by Fernando Llanos. It won a Diosa de Plata prize and received a Best Documentary Award on Morelia International Film Festival.

== Premise ==
The documentary depicts the story of Antolín Jiménez Garza, a Mexican revolutionary who joined Francisco Villa's Division del Norte troops. In the context of World War II SS Potrero del Llano and SS Faja de Oro were sunk. Mexican President Manuel Ávila Camacho declared war to Axis powers on May 28, 1942 and Antolín Jiménez decided to form Legión de Guerrilleros Mexicanos a militia made by mainly Mexican charros that would go into action against an eventual advance of the Axis in America, which was formally accepted by Ávila Camacho. The legion gather 150 000 militiamen in 250 Mexican populations. The story was discovered decades later by Jimenez's grandson, Fernando Llanos.

== Production ==
Matria is a documentary feature film that lasts 62 minutes. It was produced, directed and written by Fernando Llanos, the production direction was by José Nacif, the cinematographers were Carlos Hidalgo, Emiliano Rocha Minter, Fernando Llanos and Marcelo Castillo; the editors were Roberto Bolado, Fernando Llanos and Jessica Herreman supervised by Jorge García; the animation advisors were Simón Gerbaud, Esteban Azuela and Luis Morales and the credits and titles of Alejandro Loera. The production was by Eugenia Montiel and Mónica Ávila, Danahe Krinis, José Nacif, Carlos Morales and Joaquín Burgos. The music was by Juan Cirerol, Mi Reyna, Valentina, Lila Downs, Osiris Caballero, Omar Landa, Benjamin Shwartz and Jessica Herreman with a musical supervision by Annette Fradera and a sound design by Javier Umpierrez. The musicalization was done by Javier Umpierrez, Benjamin Shwartz, Jessica Herreman and Fernando Llanos. The sound engineers were Raúl Locatelli, Gerson Escudero, Alejandro Quintanilla and Víctor Navarro. Matria was advised by Guillermo Arriaga, Felipe Ehrenberg, Jesse Lerner and Martha Sosa.

== Awards ==
- Best Documentary Award by Morelia International Film Festival, 2014.
- Buñuel Calanda Center Award from Durango New Mexican Film Festival, 2015
- Diosa de Plata for Best Documentary, PECIME, 2015.
