= South Central Review =

- Discipline: Cultural studies
- Language: English

Publication details
- History: 1984-present
- Publisher: Johns Hopkins University Press (United States)
- Frequency: Triannually

Standard abbreviations
- ISO 4: South Cent. Rev.

Indexing
- ISSN: 0743-6831 (print); 1549-3377 (web)
- JSTOR: 07436831
- OCLC no.: 54707713

Links
- Journal homepage; Online access

The South Central Review is an academic journal established in 1984 and the official publication of the South Central Modern Language Association. It is an eclectic, interdisciplinary journal, publishing a wide range of material including literary criticism, philosophy, history, politics, film studies, and debates on cultural topics. The journal often prints special issues focusing on narrower themes. The current editor is Richard J. Golsan (Texas A&M University).

The journal is published three times a year in March, July, and November by the Johns Hopkins University Press. Circulation is 1,000 and the average length of an issue is 160 pages.
