= David Craven =

American art historian

David Lee Craven (1951 – 11 February 2012) was Distinguished Professor of Art and Art History at the University of New Mexico. He was a specialist in the art of Latin America.

== Selected publications ==
- The New Concept of Art and Popular Culture in Nicaragua Since the Revolution in 1979: An Analytical Essay and Compendium of Illustrations. Lewiston, New York: Edwin Mellen Press, 1989. ISBN 0889464898
- Diego Rivera as Epic Modernist. G.K. Hall & Co., 1997. ISBN 0816105375
- Poetics and Politics in the Life of Rudolph Baranik. Humanities Press, Atlantic Highlands, NJ, 1997. ISBN 0391039881
- Abstract Expression as Cultural Critique: Dissent During the McCarthy Period. Cambridge University Press, Cambridge, 1999. ISBN 0521434157
- Art and Revolution in Latin America, 1910-1990. Yale University Press, New Haven, 2002. ISBN 0300082118
- Dialectical Conversions: Donald Kuspit's Art Criticism. Liverpool University Press, Liverpool, 2011. ISBN 978-1846314797
