= Esse arts + opinions =

- Editor-in-Chief: Sylvette Babin
- Staff writers: Sylvette Babin, Valentin Bec, Joëlle Dubé, Anne-Marie Dubois, Gwynne Fulton, Amelia Wong Mersereau
- Categories: Art magazine
- Frequency: Triannual
- Publisher: Les éditions Esse
- Founded: 1984
- Country: Canada
- Based in: Montreal, Quebec
- Language: English / French
- Website: http://esse.ca/en
- ISSN: 0831-859X (print); 1929-3577 (web)

Esse arts + opinions, published three times a year by Les éditions Esse, is a contemporary art magazine that focuses on disciplinary and interdisciplinary practices (visual arts, performance, video, current music and dance, experimental theatre) and all forms of socially inclined, site-specific or performative intervention. Founded in 1984 in Montreal, Quebec, the magazine is incorporated in a non profit organisation in 1987. It favours analyses that address artworks within their (geographical, social, political or economical) contexts.

Esse arts + opinion positions itself as a topical magazine in the field of multidisciplinary art, as well as a communication, information and research tool. In addition to its magazine, Les éditions Esse organizes art symposiums and publishes their proceedings in bilingual books that are internationally distributed. Esse arts + opinions is a member of the Société de développement des périodiques culturels québécois; the magazine is available in print and digital formats.

== History ==
Esse was founded in 1984 at UQAM (Université du Québec à Montréal), becoming a not-for-profit organization in 1987. Esse is distributed in Canada and the United States by Disticor Magazine Distribution Services, in France by Dif' Pop' & Pollen Diffusion, and in Europe and Asia by Export Press.

Esse arts + opinions focuses on disciplinary and multidisciplinary practices (visual arts, performance, video, current music and dance, experimental theatre, etc.) and all forms of socially inclined, site-specific or performative intervention in contemporary art. In its beginnings, Esse documented artistic practices from the different regions of Quebec and focused on the production and conditions of the arts. Today, the magazine turns to art practices in Quebec, in Canada and internationally, it favours analyses that address artworks within their (geographical, social, political or economical) contexts, as well as relational and socially engaged works.

In 2007, the magazine became bilingual and is read and distributed internationally today.

=== Editorial policy ===
Each issue of Esse showcases different contemporary artists and their practice, based on a chosen them for that issue, along a selection of articles on the same them.

The magazine relies on the visuals of the cover page to communicate each theme.

== Vendu-Sold benefit auction ==
Since 2009, Les éditions Esse host annually the Vendu-Sold benefit auction with a mission of supporting the magazine's activities as well as the promotion of contemporary art. In addition to offering the chance for collectors to acquiere art works by renowned Canadian artists, Vendu-Sold distributes a portion of the profits to the participating artists.

== Editorial board and direction ==
=== Direction ===
- 1984-2002 : Johanne Chagnon
- 2002-2025 : Sylvette Babin

=== Editorial board (2025) ===
- Sylvette Babin
- Valentin Bec
- Joëlle Dubé
- Anne-Marie Dubois
- Gwynne Fulton
- Amelia Wong Mersereau

== Awards ==
- 2016 : Applied Arts Awards, « Complete Magazine Design – Series » for #85 Taking a Stance, #86 Geopolitics
- 2016 : National Magazine Awards, Silver price for the Art Direction of an Entire Issue Esse #87 The Living
- 2017 : Applied Arts Awards, « Complete Magazine Design – Series » for #87 The Living, #88 Landscape, # 89 Library
- 2017 : National Magazine Awards, Best Magazine, Category "Literary, art, and poetry"
- 2017 : Prix d’excellence de la SODEP, Category "Conception graphique" (Graphic Design), "Page couverture" (Cover Page) by Studio FEED for issue #88 Landscape
- 2017 : National Magazine Awards, Honourable Mention for the Art Direction Grand Prix, by Studio FEED for issue #91 LGBT+
- 2017 : National Magazine Awards, Honourable Mention for the Cover Grand Prix, by Studio FEED for issue #91 LGBT+
- 2017 : The ICMA – International Creative Media Award, Worldwide Competition for Corporate Medias, Books, Corporate Design and Magazines, Germany. Award of Excellence : Category Front Page, by Studio FEED for issue #91 LGBT+
- 2017 : The ICMA – International Creative Media Award, Worldwide Competition for Corporate Medias, Books, Corporate Design and Magazines, Germany. Silver : Print Magazines - Catégorie Art, Architecture, Design and Music
- 2017 : National Magazine Awards, Best Magazine: Art, Literary, & Culture
- 2018 : Prix d’excellence de la SODEP, Category "Critique" (Criticism), "Texte d’opinion critique" (Critical Essay) for Sylvette Babin's article titled "Retranscription of Foundational Texts in Simon Bertrand’s Work" in issue #89 Library
- 2018 : Prix d’excellence de la SODEP, Category "Conception graphique" (Graphic Design), "Pages intérieures" (Interior Pages) by Studio FEED for issue #87 The Living
- 2018 : Prix d’excellence de la SODEP, Category "Conception graphique" (Graphic Design), "Pages intérieures" (Interior pages) by Studio FEED for issue #91 LGBT+
- 2018 : Prix d’excellence de la SODEP, Category "Conception graphique" (Graphic Design), "Page couverture" (Cover Page) by Studio FEED for issue #91 LGBT+
- 2019 : National Magazine Awards, Best Magazine: Art, Literary, & Culture
- 2019 : The ICMA – International Creative Media Award, Worldwide Competition for Corporate Medias, Books, Corporate Design and Magazines, Germany. Silver : Print Magazines - Art, Architecture, Design and Music
- 2020 : The ICMA – International Creative Media Award, Worldwide Competition for Corporate Medias, Books, Corporate Design and Magazines, Germany. Silver : Print Magazines - Category Art, Architecture, Design and Music
- 2021 : Prix d’excellence de la SODEP, Category "Conception graphique" (Graphic Design), "Page couverture" (Cover Page) by Studio FEED for issue #99 Plants
- 2021 : Prix d’excellence de la SODEP, Awards for Best issue for issue #99 Plants
- 2022 : National Magazine Awards, Art Direction Grand Prix by Studio FEED for issue #102 (Re)seeing Painting
- 2022 : Prix d’excellence de la SODEP, Awards for Magazine of the year
- 2024 : Prix du meilleur magazin, National Magazine Awards, Award for Best Magazine in the category "Art, Literary and Culture"
- 2024 : Prix d'excellence de la SODEP, Award for "Conception graphique pages intérieurs" for issu #109 Water

In 2005, Esse tied for first place for the Grafika Grand Prix with issue no. 52. In 2006 issue no. 57 received awards from Applied Arts Magazine and Coupe Magazine for its graphic design. Issue no. 58 received another Grafika award in 2007. In 2009, Esse's 25th anniversary issue (Trouble-fête/Killjoy) rethinking the meaning of celebration wins a Grafika award in the "Magazines" category. In 2010, Esse is among the finalists of the Conseil des Arts de Montréal's 2009 Grand Prix and in 2011, Esse wins the Grafika award once more, for the previous year's three issues, Sabotage, Bling Bling, and Miniature.

== Publications by Les éditions Esse ==
Publications
Esse magazine, issue #1-115, 1984-
Places and non-places of contemporary art, Les éditions Esse, Montréal, 2005, 248 pages. (Bilingual edition)
The Undecidable: Gaps and Displacements of Contemporary Art, Les éditions Esse, Montréal, 2008, 296 pages. (Bilingual edition)
Vendu–Sold Insight Into Collecting ans the Art Market, Les éditions Esse, Montréal, 2009, 240 pages. (Bilingual edition)
Formes urbaines : circulation, stockage et transmission de l'expression culturelle à Montréal, Les éditions Esse, 2014, 232 pages.(French edition)
Jacynthe Carrier - Pièces montées, Les éditions Esse, 2018, 92 pages. (Bilingual edition)
Le désordre des choses. L'art et l'épreuve du politique, Les éditions Esse, Montréal, 2019, 240 pages. (French edition)

== Indexing ==
Esse is indexed in Academic OneFile, ARTbibliographies Modern, Arts & Humanities Full Text, Canadian Business & Current Affairs, Canadian Periodical Index Quarterly, Fine Arts and Music Collection, General OneFile, Repère, and available on Érudit Platform and Flipster – Digital Magazines by Ebsco Publishing.

Esse is a member of the Société de développement des périodiques culturels québécois (SODEP) and of Magazines Canada.
