= Martha Hellion =

Mexican-British visual artist

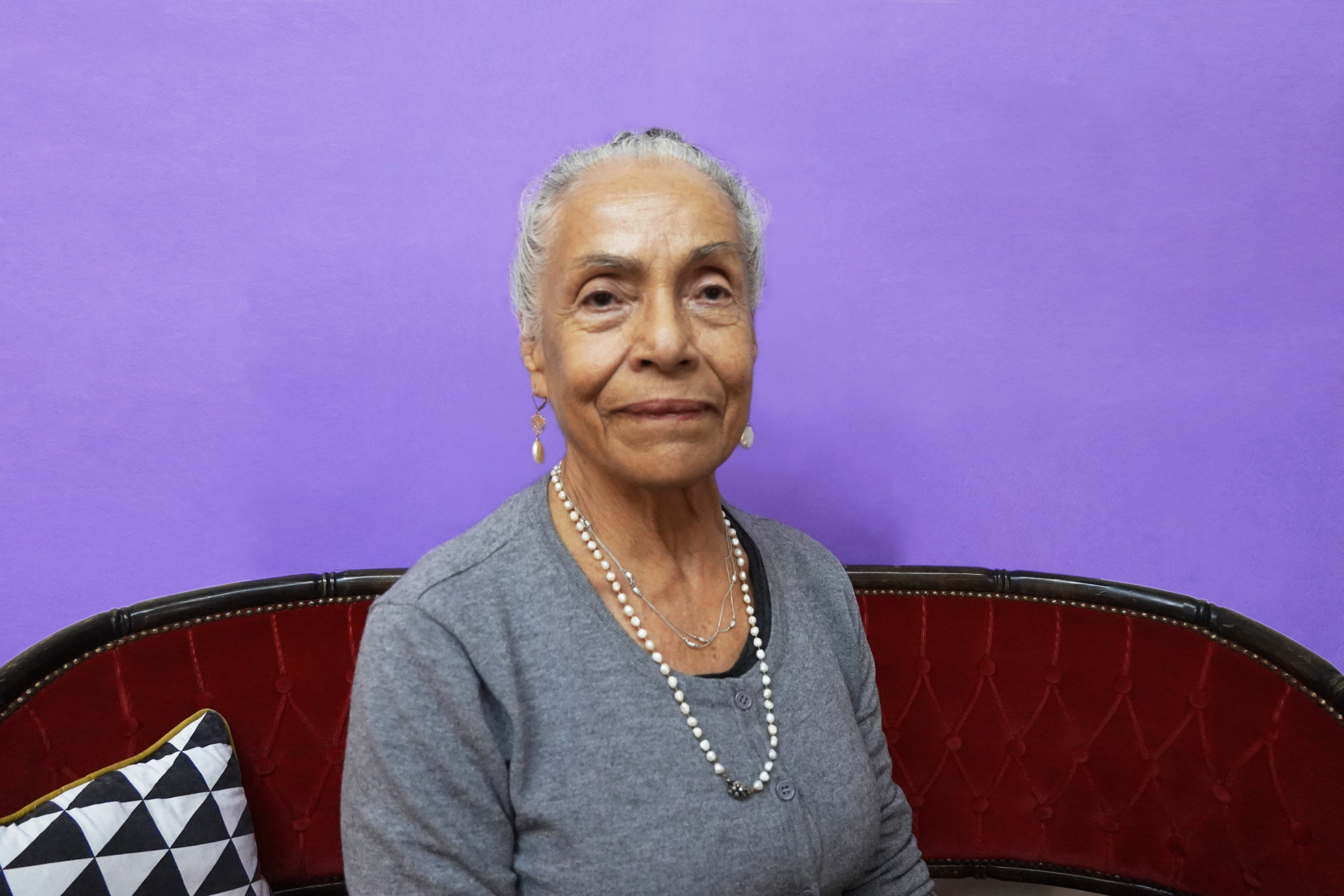
- Martha Hellion, Zurich 2022.
- Born: 25 September 1937 (age 87); Mexico City, Mexico
- Known for: Art, Curatorial Practice, Publishing

Martha Hellion is a visual artist, radical publisher, and freelance curator. Her formal studies were in Architecture and Museum Design; in later years she continued to specialize in experimental art in England and the Netherlands. From then on her praxis has been focused on editions of artists' books and other multidisciplinary projects.

She is co-founder of the Beau Geste Press in England, a Fluxus-associated enterprise that was part of the transnational 1970s avant-gardes. Hellion moved from Mexico to England with fellow artist (and then-husband) Felipe Ehrenberg in the wake of the military's execution of student demonstrators in Tlatelolco, Mexico City, in 1968. With artist and art historian David Mayor, cartoonist Chris Welch, and Madeleine Gallard, they eventually founded the Beau Geste Press on a farm in Devon. The collective published eight issues of Schmuck between 1972 and 1978 in editions of around 550. They also published numerous artists' books by Ehrenberg, Mayor, and other artists and writers (including Carolee Schneemann, Michael Nyman, Michael Legett, Allen Fisher, Ulises Carrión, and Cecilia Vicuña) at the Press. The goal of the magazine, and Beau Geste Press, was to foster international relationships between artists. With Schmuck they dedicated special issues to art from various countries: France, Germany, Hungary, Japan, Czechoslovakia, and Iceland. Hellion has continued to carry on all kinds of activities around books and has also taken part in specialized seminars where research on artists' books continues. She is the editor of Ulises Carrión: Libros de artista (Universidad Nacional Autónoma de México, 2003), among other books.

Hellion is the founder of the Center of Research and Documentation on Artists' Publications in Mexico City, an institution that presents, distributes, and disseminates publications.
