= Beau Geste Press =

Former English publisher

Beau Geste Press was an independent publisher run by Felipe Ehrenberg, Martha Hellion and David Mayor. It was active from 1970 until 1976 at Langford Court South in Cullompton, Devon, where Hellion and Ehrenberg lived.

== History ==
Art historian David Mayor eventually joined the couple at Longford, when he became the public-relations manager for the press. British cartoonist Chris Welch and his partner, Madeleine Gallard, founding members of the press, lived at Longford in 1970 and 1971. Other artists involved included Terry Wright, Pat Wright, and Takako Saito.

Beau Geste Press published art works, concept booklets, pamphlets, magazines, flyers and postcards. The press aimed to function outside of the commercial art market, to critique the power of art institutions and to create projects in opposition to the consumerist and political mainstream. Their 1973-74 catalogue declared "Beau Geste Press is not a business. It's a way of life. We exist because you exist. Our activities serve as a link-up, stressing contact between Britain and Latin America as well as East European countries. We are political though not politicized. Our editions are limited because we print, bind and distribute ourselves."

Although their books were often produced cheaply in small editions–"within the satisfying boundaries of an operation sponsored by no one," as their editorial manifesto reads–they worked with contributors from a wide and international network including Mexico, Chile, Japan, Iceland and Canada.

Their printing techniques included mimeograph, offset lithography, and letterpress.

In 1972 Beau Geste Press initiated a serial called Schmuck, in which each issue featured artists from a specific region. There were eight issues of the magazine, which covered Iceland, Hungary, Chezchoslovakia, France, Germany and Japan. Each issue was edited by an artist from the location.

Also in 1972, Beau Geste Press published the catalogue to the FLUXshoe exhibition, a traveling show of artist multiples organized by David Mayor, Ken Friedman and Mike Weaver.

== Selected publications ==
- Ulises Carrión, Arguments
- Felipe Ehrenberg and Martha Hellion Generación F. Ehrenberg
- Felipe Ehrenberg, David Mayor, Terry Wright, editors, FLUXshoe
- Felipe Ehrenberg, Pussywillow: A Journal of Conditions (1973)
- David Mayor, C(l)ues (1973)
- Takako Saito, To My Friends
- Carolee Schneeman, who produced Parts of a Body House Book during a residency at the press.
- Cecilia Vicuña, Sabor a mi (1973)
