= Felipe Ehrenberg =

Mexican artist

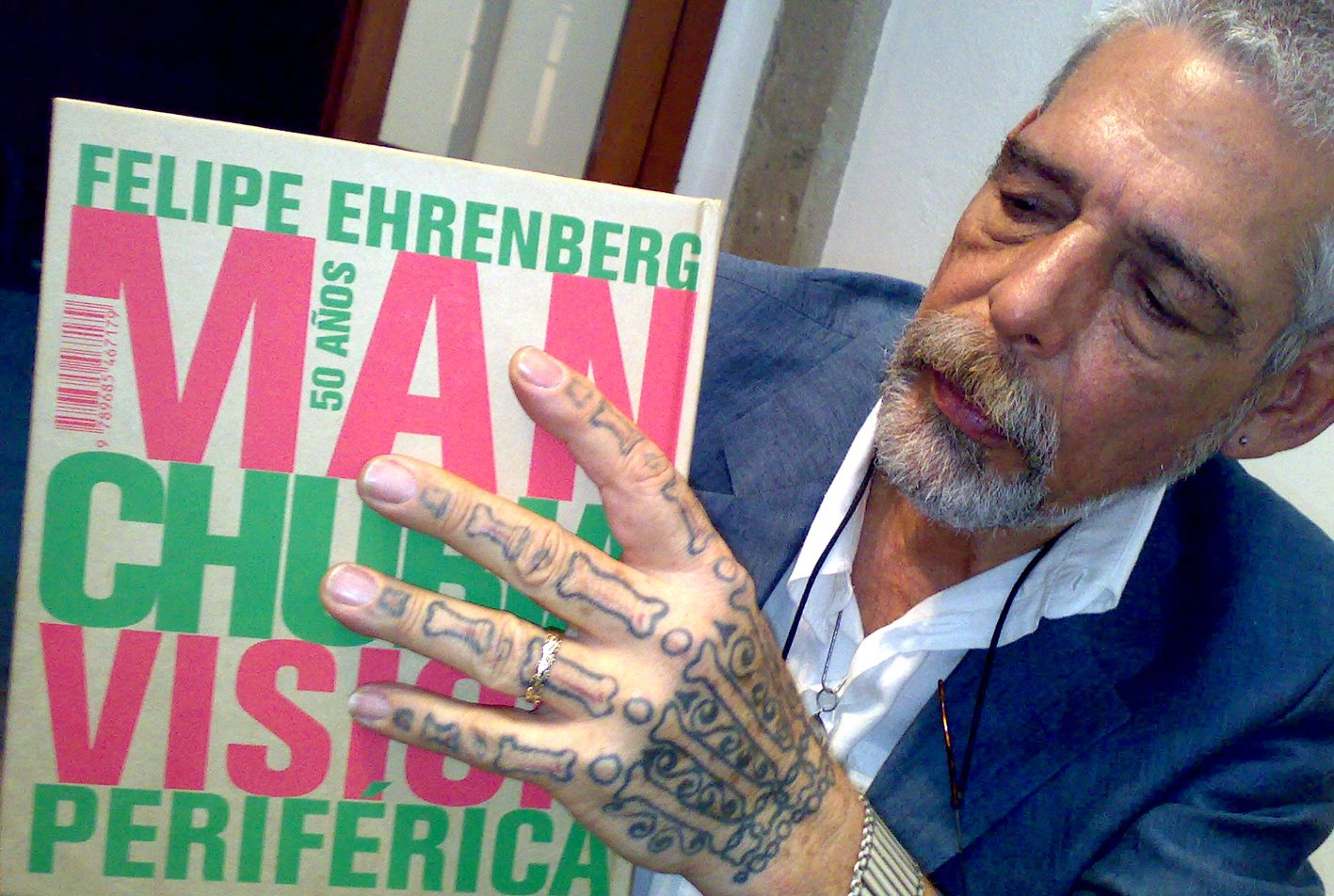
Felipe Ehrenberg

Felipe Ehrenberg (27 June 1943, Tlacopac, Mexico City, 1943 – 15 May 2017) was a Mexican artist who worked in painting, drawing, printmaking and performance, among other mediums. He also published books and magazines.

Ehrenberg's artistic career of more than 50 years covered the conceptual art of the seventies, including mail art and mimeography, a neographical technique of which he was a pioneer. His multifaceted personality rendered a classical classification of his work difficult, so he defined himself as a neologist since the seventies; the term itself is a neologism which underlines the experimental characteristics of his work. He considered himself an artist, chronicler, professor, politician, diplomatic, editor, actor, organizer, and tireless traveler.

== Biography ==
Ehrenberg was born in Tlacopac, Mexico City, in 1943. He started his education as editor, continuing later as visual and graphic artist with different mentors, amongst which muralist José Chávez Morado, painter and sculptor Feliciano Béjar, and the artist Mathias Goeritz stand out. He presented his first exposition in 1960, in a collective exhibition organized at Galería de la Paz, Mexico City, and exhibited his work at other galleries in that city and in Acapulco between 1963 and 1964. His first individual exhibitions "La Montaña" and "Dibujos y Epoxis" were set up in 1965 at Galería del Centro de Arte y Artesanía and at Galería 1577 respectively. Between 1964 and 1967 he was editor of the arts section of the México City Times, an English publication, where he also wrote under the pseudonym "Montenegro." In the last years of the decade his work was shown frequently in individual as well as in collective exhibitions and started gaining international attention.

In 1968 he represented Mexico in Salón Codex de Pintura Latinoamericana de Buenos Aires, where he won the prize "Premio Femirama de pintura." 1968, a crucial year in global politics, is also fundamental in Mexican history: a week before the inauguration of the Olympic Games in Mexico City, the military suppressed a student demonstration; hundreds of participants died. Impressed by the situation and in danger of being imprisoned, Ehrenberg went into exile to England with his family. It was there, with David Mayor and Martha Hellion, that the Beau Geste Press was founded, a collective of artists dedicated to publishing the work of visual poets, conceptual artists, neo-dadaists and experimental artists, many of whom were connected to the Fluxus movement. During these years Ehrenberg formed part of the foundation of the group "Polygonal Workshop," where he won the Perpetua Prize for the design and illustration of Opal Nation's "The Man Who Entered Pictures, 1974," edited by Southwestern Arts Association/British Arts Council.

Ehrenberg returned to Mexico in early 1974, moving to Xico, a small town in the state of Veracruz. Continuing with his collective vocation, he joined Victor Munoz, Carlos Finck, and Jose Antonio Hernandez Amezcua, to found "Grupo Process Pentagono," a seminal movement which was later known as Movimiento Grupal. While developing his artistic career, Ehrenberg also started his teaching, giving courses in installations, cultural activism, and administration for the artists at Universidad Veracruzana. In 1975 he received a Guggenheim Fellowship for his investigation of the duality of Latin American culture, concentrating on "schizophrenic attitudes and schismatic in visual arts as a result of bilingualism." In 1979 he founded H2O (Haltos 2 Ornos) Talleres de Comunicación, a collective exhibition of 25 art instructors who redefined the models of independent editing and held muralist workshops. For 10 years, H2O directed the creation of more than 500 small communities and communication groups, and the creation of approximately 1,100 collective murals across Mexico. Ehrenberg's interest in the sociocultural aspects of art and his participation in the community converted him into a public figure in the 1980s. While he kept exhibiting his work at individual and collective exhibitions, he also ran unsuccessfully as candidate for the municipal and federal elections in 1982 for PSUM (Partido Socialista Unificado de México). Three years later, due to the earthquake of 1985, Ehrenberg became involved in the protection and reconstruction of the legendary Tepito neighborhood against real estate speculation. When a year later another earthquake destroyed the neighborhood San Jacinto in the city of San Salvador, Ehrenberg coordinated the reconstruction program "Barrio a Barrio," which the city implemented to promote self-help based on his experience in Tepito. For his efforts and representing both neighborhoods, he was awarded the Roque Dalton del Consejo de Cooperación con la Cultura y la Ciencia en El Salvador (CONCISES) medal in 1987.

In 1984 Ehrenberg travelled to the Art Institute of Chicago as an invited professor, where he held a seminar in "Art and Politics", as well as other courses in history of art. He returned in 1998 to hold the seminar again, adding "Making Things Visible: The Artist as Activist." From the mid-1970s on his themes included death, as it manifests in Mexico, where the traditions of the original villages syncretize with Christianity brought by the Spanish colonizers. Ehrenberg celebrated Dia de los Muertos with paintings and drawings or installations/nontraditional offerings. In a similar fashion, he frequently investigated other aspects of the cultural clash of his work.

In autumn of 1990, Ehrenberg was invited to be a resident artist of Nexus Press, Atlanta, where he published the Codex Areoscriptus Ehrenbergensis: A Visual Score of Iconotropisms, an anthology of his iconographic heritage of patterns. In October of the same year he created the exterior installation "Light Up our Border – I," commissioned by Archer Huntington Gallery of University of Texas-Austin. A month later he presented "Light up our Border – II" at Bridge for Contemporary Art, in El Paso, Texas. Both installations, together with "Curtain Call," form part of the installation presented at INSITE 94 (San Diego/Tijuana), which deals with the deep and precarious relationship between the US and Mexico. In 1993 he presented "Preterito Imperfecto," an ambitious demonstration which includes a variety of genres, at Museo Carrillo Gil in Mexico City. It alludes to the quincentennial of the discovery of the Americas and the encounter of multiple continents: the Americas, Europe, and Africa. Following the 1990s Ehrenberg continued to be active as an artist as well as an essayist on contemporary culture. From 2001 to 2006 he served as cultural attaché to Brazil. In 2008 "Manchuria-vision periferica" was inaugurated, a first retrospective of his work which was presented at Museo de Arte Moderno, Mexico City, traveling afterwards to the Museum of Latin American Art (MOLAA), Los Angeles (May 2010) and to Pinacoteca do Estado de São Paulo (September 2010). In 2014 Ehrenberg moved to Mexico permanently.

He also had appearances in some films, such as an uncredited maniac in the Boris Karloff movie Fear Chamber.

Ehrenberg died on 15 May 2017 in Cuernavaca, Morelos, at the age of 73.
