= Cowtown Guitars =

Vintage guitar shop in Las Vegas, Nevada

Coordinates: 36.156299°N 115.153577°W

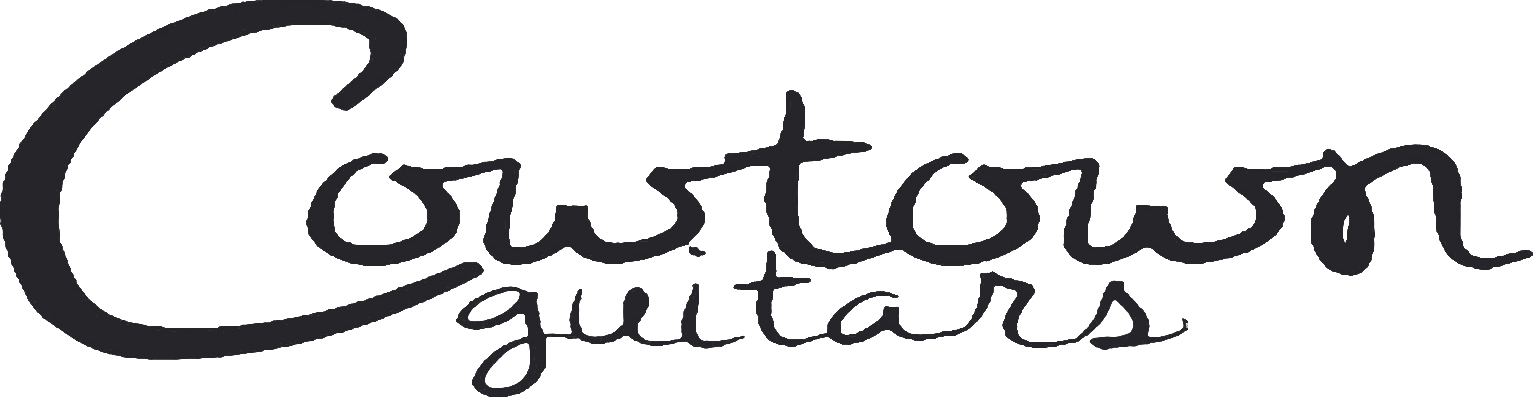

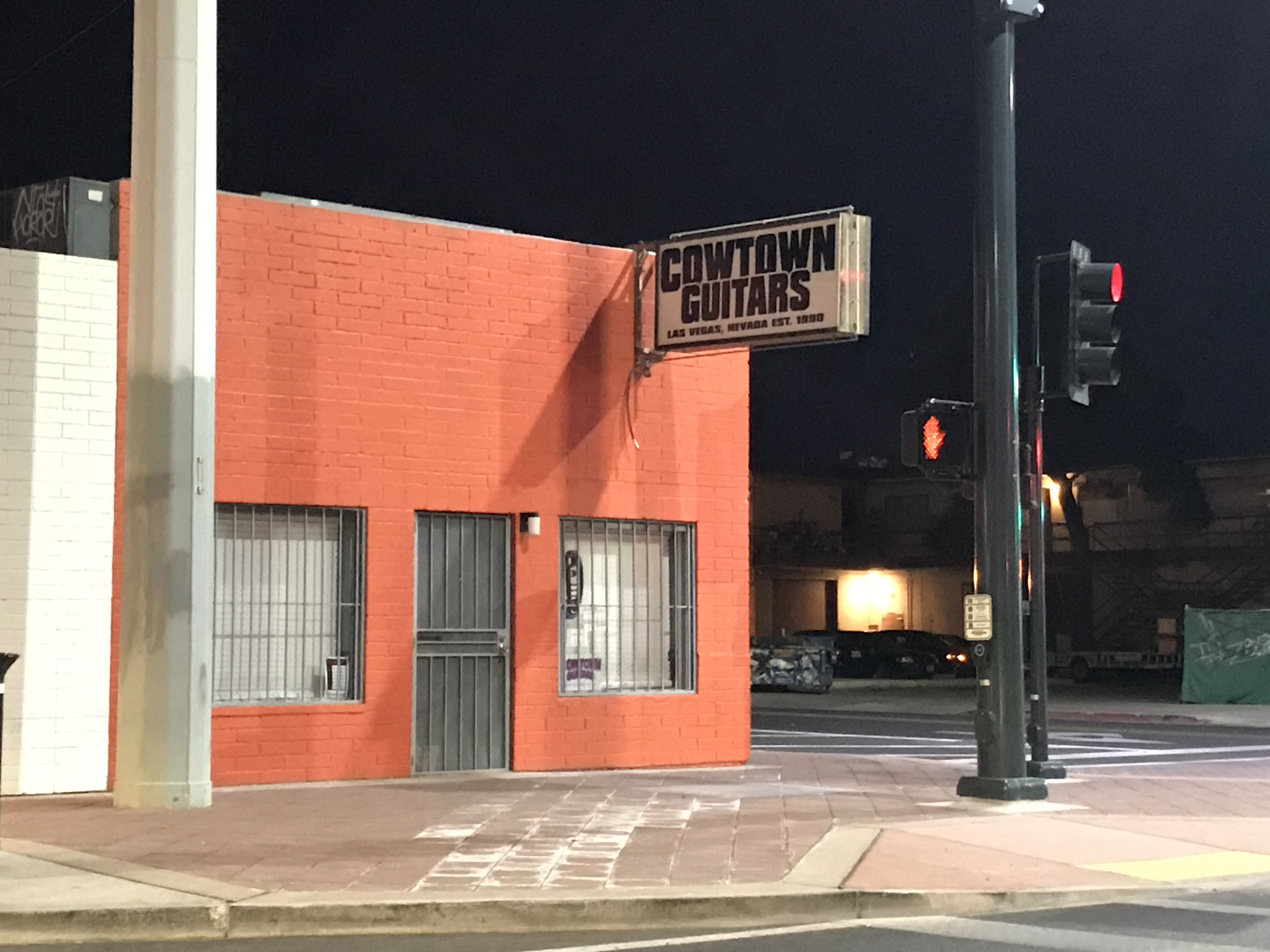
- Cowtown Guitars storefront at 1331 S. Commerce
- Type: Privately held company
- Industry: Musical instruments
- Founded: 1990
- Defunct: 2019
- Headquarters: 1331 S. Commerce Street Las Vegas, Nevada 89104
- Key people: Jesse and Roxie Amoroso, owners
- Products: Vintage guitars, vintage amps, equipment and accessories
- Number of employees: 2
- Website: cowtownguitars.com

Cowtown Guitars was a vintage guitar shop located in Las Vegas, Nevada, owned by husband and wife, Jesse and Roxie Amoroso. The shop was well known having one of the largest collection of vintage guitars in North America and boasted a client list of celebrities, which includes Carlos Santana and Imagine Dragons. Owner Jesse Amoroso has appeared several times as the vintage guitar expert on the History Channel's reality television series Pawn Stars. The shop closed in 2019 following a prolonged decline in other business ventures run by the Amorosos.

== History ==
Cowtown was opened in 1990 by Mark Chatfield in the Shapter Center strip mall at the corner of Rt. 161 and N. Meadows Blvd on the north side of Columbus, Ohio, a city sometimes called "Cowtown". The store was operated by Chatfield, who also toured as Bob Seger's guitarist, until he sold the business to longtime employees Jesse and Roxie Amoroso in 2011.

After owning the store for less than a year, Jesse and Roxie Amoroso moved Cowtown to a new location in the arts district of downtown Las Vegas. The shop was now closer to the Gold & Silver Pawn Shop, where Amoroso continues to do appraisals for Pawn Stars. With the success of shows like Pawn Stars, and American Restoration, both of which are filmed in downtown Las Vegas, there have also been rumors of Cowtown Guitars acquiring their own reality television series.

In 2012, Cowtown became the official broker of a 1963 Fender Stratocaster once owned by Jimi Hendrix. Jesse Amoroso was one of three vintage guitar experts to appraise the guitar, after which was authenticated by the specific modifications made by Hendrix personally, its unusual green pickguard, and a telltale black mark on the inside of the electronics compartment. These details were confirmed by Amoroso along with Hendrix's brother, Leon, who remembered seeing the guitar around the apartment he shared with Jimi in the 1960s. The guitar originally belonged to studio head Henry "Juggy" Murray at Juggy Sound. It is believed that Hendrix used the guitar to record Blues in ¾" and My Friend for a Noel Redding solo album.

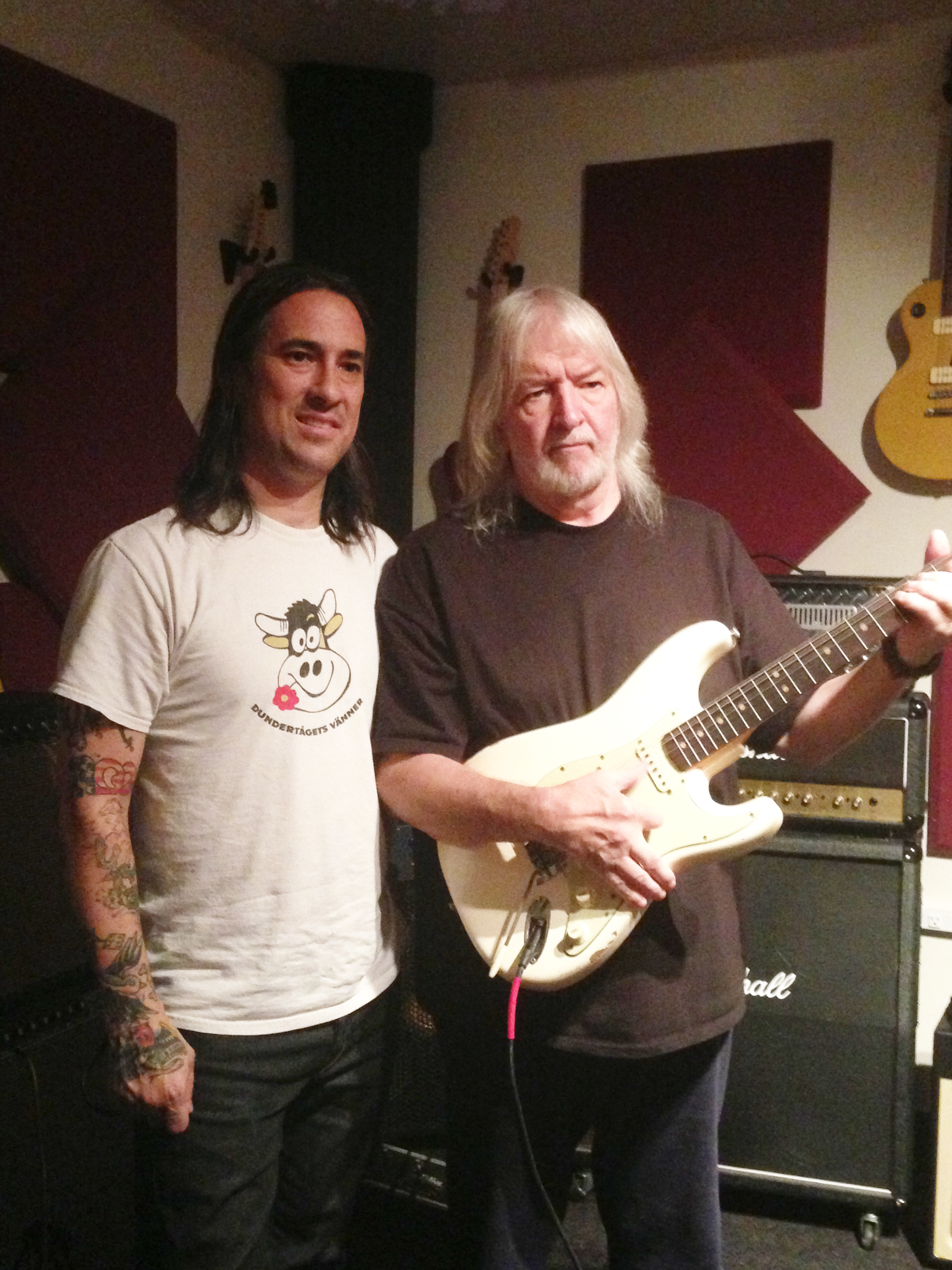
In June 2013, Jesse Amoroso (left) and Seymour Duncan authenticate a guitar once owned by Jimi Hendrix.

When Cowtown Guitars relocated in early 2012, guitarist Jake E. Lee agreed to cut the ribbon at the grand reopening ceremony. In June 2013, Jesse and the Stratocaster visited Seymour Duncan who had originally custom wound the pickups for Hendrix in the 1960s. Duncan authenticated the pickups and pickguard.

== Owners ==
Jesse and Roxie Amoroso are musicians who have performed together in the Las Vegas-based rock bands Crazy Chief, Pigasus, and The Loud Pipes. They were married in the home of Roxie's parents on June 6, 2006. Together, they have three children, one of whom is named Gibson Felix after the famous guitar manufacturer. Self-proclaimed "soul-mates," the couple have been known to dress similarly in public while together. In 2019, the couple are headed toward divorce.

In October 2005 Jesse and Roxie opened The Clubhouse, a large rehearsal facility that was run by the couple's production company Revenge Therapy Productions. The 3 story building contained eight rehearsal rooms of varying sizes, with a single large rehearsal room on the top floor equipped with a considerable amount of amenities and a view of the Las Vegas Strip. Epic Records band Mudvayne was a client of The Clubhouse before it eventually closed when a partner of the Amoroso's pulled out.

Jesse Amoroso is a guitarist, formerly of Crazy Chief, The Loud Pipes, Cyanide Blues, and Pigasus, a band Jesse once described as sounding like "God screaming at the top of his lungs". Jesse was also co-owner of Cowtown Guitars with wife Roxie. His main expertise lies in vintage stringed instruments and amplifiers, which he frequently appraises for the reality television series Pawn Stars on the History Channel. When asked by the Las Vegas Sun to comment on his marriage, Jesse said, "It's kind of a blessing and a curse, because you're in a relationship with someone who's a musician and understands being in a band and stuff, but you also don't have that voice of reason that some people do."

Jennifer "Roxie" Amoroso moved to Las Vegas from Death Valley, CA when she was 18 and began designing costumes for casinos around town before starting a screen printing business. She became well known as a live music promoter who has booked for several local venues around Las Vegas, which include Boomers Bar, East Bonanza Theatre, Texas Station Casino's South Padre Lounge, The Roadhouse Casino, Squiggy's Bar, The Las Vegas Country Saloon, and The Clubhouse. Her colorful personality earned her a reputation among her peers in Las Vegas. In January 2006, Roxie made Las Vegas CityLife's top 5 list of "Women in the Local Music Scene You Definitely Don't Want to Piss Off". Roxie was also Vice Chair of the Clark County Animal Control Advisory Committee in Las Vegas.

In April 2018, Roxie Amoroso became part owner and managing member of Beauty Bar Las Vegas, a popular bar and music venue in Downtown Las Vegas. This change in ownership was announced in the press the following August. The announcement delay can be attributed to a number of issues plaguing the bar, including the death of Pantera/Hellyeah drummer Vinnie Paul who was seen partying at Beauty Bar Las Vegas hours prior to his passing.

In March 2019, Beauty Bar Las Vegas was served an eviction notice citing "lewd activity" and "disorder". Las Vegas Metropolitan Police confirmed several visits to Beauty Bar Las Vegas, with one investigation revealing an employee selling drugs from within the business. On April 1, 2019, a second eviction notice was posted on Beauty Bar Las Vegas, effectively shuttering the business.

On April 3, 2019, Las Vegas City Council met to discuss possible action regarding the approval of Beauty Bar Las Vegas's tavern-limited license, which governs alcohol beverage sales. The Council voted to revoke Roxie Amoroso's temporary license and deny her application for a permanent license based on several city and county violations. In the meeting, City of Las Vegas Deputy Planning Director Mary McElhone remarked:

In the eight short months that this operation has been open, the Beauty Bar has had problems with the security staff and general management obeying laws and regulations, including incidences [sic] that have involved [Las Vegas Metropolitan Police] and have included lack of cooperation. Ms. Amoroso has not demonstrated that she is capable of operating a night club with a Tavern-Limited License.

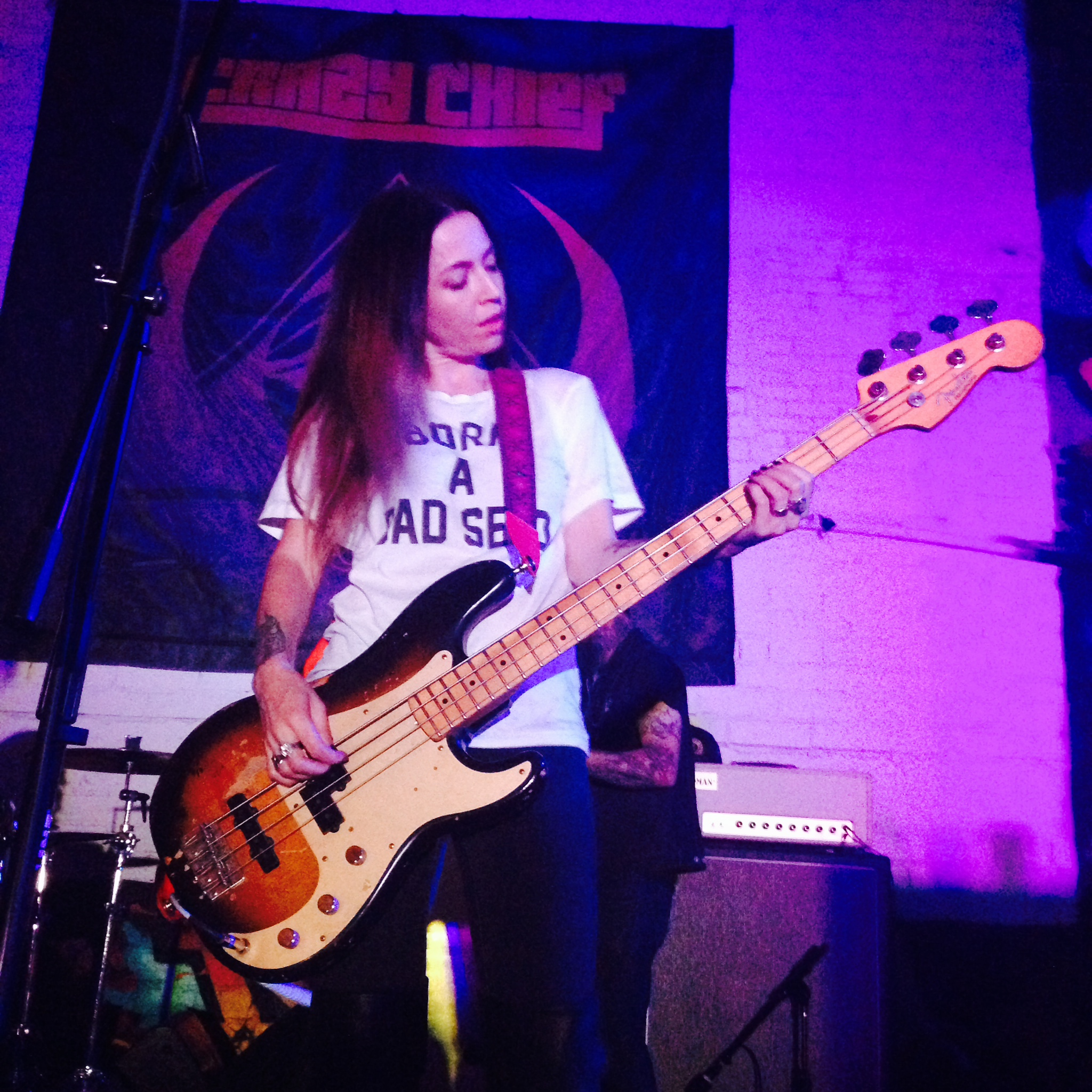
Crazy Chief's Roxie Amoroso performing live

=== Staff ===
- Davis – Onsite Guitar Repair/Luthier

=== Crazy Chief ===
Along with the Amorosos, Crazy Chief, now defunct, included members of previous notable bands, prompting the press to refer to them as a local "super group". Singer Drew Johnson also fronts Mojo Rising, a Doors cover band, while drummer Dan Conway performed on tour with Warrant and rhythm guitarist Nick Thompson performed in Dirty Somethings, which became known as Red Feather shortly before disbanding.

In November 2012, Las Vegas CityLife announced plans for Black Camaro's Brian Garth to move out of Chrome Werewolf, his studio of two years, and into the Amoroso's house to record Crazy Chief's debut album.

== Events ==
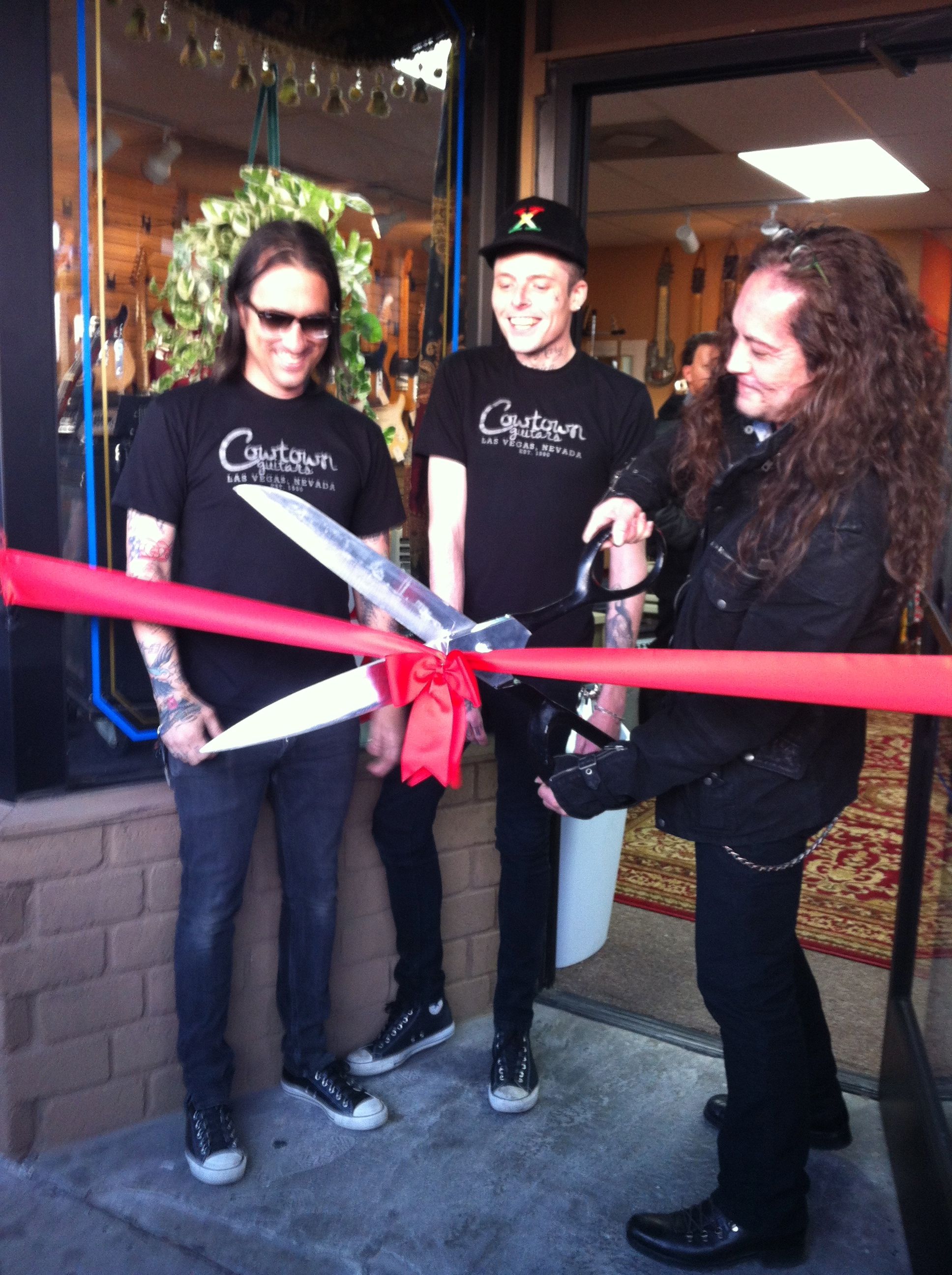
Guitarist Jake E. Lee cuts the ribbon at Cowtown's grand reopening ceremony in Las Vegas in 2012.

When Cowtown Guitars relocated in early 2012, guitarist Jake E. Lee agreed to cut the ribbon at the grand reopening ceremony.

On June 1, 2012, Cowtown participated in the monthly First Friday event held in the arts district of Las Vegas. The event featured Echopark Guitars by guitar builder Gabriel Currie. The hand crafted guitars were made famous by artists such as Jakob Dylan, Brad Whitford, and Joe Perry of Aerosmith, and Jonny "2 Bags" Wickersham of Social Distortion. The success of this event spurred the idea of bringing in more guitar makers to future events as owner Jesse Amoroso tells a reporter for Symphony Park, "It was great to have Gabriel here in person for a meet and greet, and we’re excited to continue hosting new guests at Cowtown every First Friday.”

On December 7, 2012, Cowtown hosted an event to celebrate the premiere of their episode of Sailor Jerry's Hold Fast artist documentary series. According to Las Vegas Weekly, the project seeks out “individuals and businesses who have dedicated themselves to mastering their field and then fearlessly pursued its innovation like Norman 'Sailor Jerry' Collins did with tattooing.” The event featured Las Vegas' Pick Your Poison Bake Shop, Studio 21 Tattoo, and Cowtown Guitars. Cowtown also served as the donation center for used bicycles at this event.

=== Exile On Main Street ===
On June 6, 2014 Roxie and Jesse opened a vintage clothing and accessory boutique in the suite next to Cowtown. Exile On Main Street borrows its name from the Rolling Stones album of the same name, and is a pun on its location on Main St. in Las Vegas. The opening night event was sponsored by Sailor Jerry Rum with musical guest Jonny “2 Bags” Wickersham of socal punk bands Social Distortion and U.S. Bombs performing a live set. In 2018, Exile On Main Street shuttered its doors.

== Philanthropy ==
In January 2011, a friend inspired Roxie to host a fundraising event of which the proceeds would go towards building a well in Africa. Amoroso said in an interview, “It only takes $2,000 to build a well that will [provide] 900 people—900 babies, mothers, fathers, sisters and brothers—with water...So, I was like, Hey...I want to build a well.” Along with the help of her sister at Northwest Nazarene University, the event helped Amoroso raise a total of $2500 toward the Compassion for Africa organization.

In August 2011, Cowtown teamed up with Title I Hope and Outback Steakhouse for a food and hygiene products drive to benefit the Vegas Valley's homeless youth. Jesse was featured in an interview on Las Vegas' Channel 8 news promoting the cause.

In a partnership between shop owners in the 18b Las Vegas Arts District Neighborhood Association and Autism Community Trust, In June 2012, Jesse appeared on Las Vegas Channel 13's Morning Blend in an interview with Donny Osmond to promote Guitars For Autism, a charity that benefits children with autism. Cowtown serves as a drop off location for both guitar and cash donations for the charity. When asked in the interview how Cowtown became involved in the charity, Jesse tells Osmond, "It's something we're passionate about at the shop, we have a lot of friends with kids who have autism."

Roxie later told the Las Vegas Business Press, "we're determined to collect 100 guitars...Whether we have to use guitars from my husband's collection or raise money to purchase additional guitars, we'll get them."

== Awards ==
- Best Music Shop 2012 – Vegas SEVEN
- Best Restaurant to Blow Your Paycheck – Las Vegas Weekly
- In July 2016, Exile received a Best of The City award from Vegas Seven Magazine.
- In February 2017, Exile was awarded "best vintage store" in Nevada Public Radio publication Desert Companion's 2016 Best of the City.

== Pawn Stars episodes ==
- No Shoes, No Shirt, No Service (October 24, 2013)
- Hot Air Buffoon (Episode 2.5)
- Chumdog Millionaire (Episode 3.22)
- Strike a Chord (Episode 4.10)
- Honor They Father (Episode 4.34)
- Face the Music (Episode 4.38)
- Buyer Beware (Episode 5.5)
- Les is More (Episode 5.18)
- Kick the Can (Episode 5.51)
- On Guard (Episode 6.7)
- Little Pawn Shop of Horrors (Episode 6.17)
- Book 'Em Rick (Episode 6.31)
- Tee'd Off (Episode 8.50)
- Ponies and Phonies (Episode 8.55)
