= Same Sex Mary =

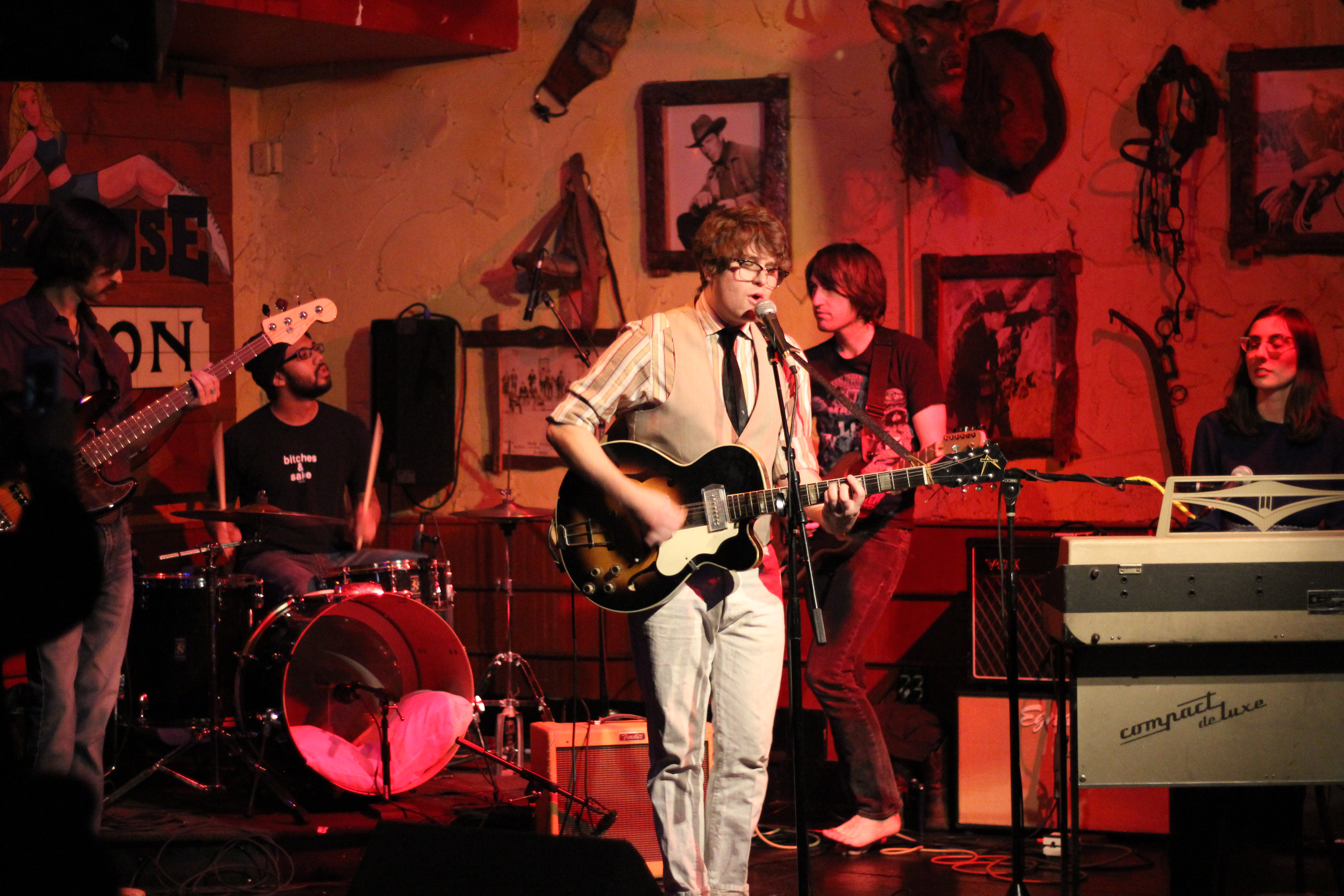
- Same Sex Mary performing at the Bunkhouse Saloon in Las Vegas (from left: J. Aragon, M. McGuinness, J.H. Adams, T. Huddleston, T. Stefanova)

Background information
- Origin: Boulder City, Nevada, USA
- Genres: indie rock, alternative rock
- Years active: 2012–present
- Members: James Howard Adams (Guitar, vocals), Tsvetelina Stefanova (Farfisa, vocals), Jason Aragon (bass), Aaron Guidry (drums), Brian Cantrell (guitar)
- Past members: Michael McGuinness (drums), Tyler Huddleston (lead guitar)
- Website: www.samesexmary.com

Same Sex Mary is an independent rock band from Boulder City, Nevada formed by James Howard Adams with Tsvetelina Stefanova, and are well known members of the Las Vegas indie music scene.

== Formation ==
Adams studied music at Las Vegas Academy where he met Stefanova, who moved to Las Vegas from Bulgaria to study music and photography. The two have been in a relationship since 2005, and lived together while Stefanova pursued her degree in Flagstaff, AZ. After graduating in 2009, Stefanova and Adams moved back to Boulder City where they formed Same Sex Mary as a duo, with Adams on guitar and vocals, and Stefanova on Farfisa and vocals.

With plans for a lengthy recording session, the duo added drummer Mike McGuinness (Dude City) shortly before discovering lead guitarist Tyler Huddleston (Shiny Boots of Leather), who they found busking on the streets of Las Vegas. Two weeks before heading to Tucson to record at Wavelab Studios, James asked bass player Jason Aragon of The Clydesdale to join the lineup, completing the band's transformation from a duo to a five-piece rock ensemble in 2012.

== Career ==
=== Sex Cells ===
The band traveled to Arizona at the end of 2012 to record new material at WaveLab Studios, where they performed live, using an analog tape recorder rather than the modern standard of using digital recording equipment. In early 2013 the inaugural Life Is Beautiful Festival held auditions in Las Vegas, with Same Sex Mary rounding out the final chosen lineup that included locals Rusty Maples, and Coastwest Unrest. At that time, the band was undergoing a successful crowdfunding campaign to aid in releasing Sex Cells on vinyl 12". Sex Cells was released in March 2013, with all Kickstarter donors receiving a vinyl copy of the album. In July 2013, the band won a Las Vegas Weekly Award for Best Indie-Scene Mainstay before performing in the inaugural Life Is Beautiful Festival the following October.

=== XXX ===
In July 2014 Same Sex Mary released a 3-song digital EP on their Bandcamp page titled XXX followed by the departure of lead guitarist Tyler Huddleston who left the band to pursue a second degree in electrical engineering. McGuinness has also been replaced, with the addition of Aaron Guidry on drums. In August 2014, the band returned to Wavelab Studios in Tucson, with Huddleston joining them in the studio, though the band plans on touring with new lead guitarist Brian Cantrell once their second album is released.

=== The Second Coming ===
Returning to WaveLab in August 2014, Same Sex Mary recorded their LP The Second Coming with former guitarist Tyler Huddleston. The band premiered the album 11 months later on July 25, 2015, at the Las Vegas Country Club after the location originally planned for the premiere, The Bunkhouse Saloon, closed its doors for a second time, forcing the band to find a new venue for the event that would see two actors performing alongside a seven-piece choir while the band provided the soundtrack live.

== Members ==
- Aaron Guidry (drums) was born in Louisiana, received his master's from West Virginia University in percussion performance, and later taught high school band in San Antonio. Guidry moved to Las Vegas in 2002 to audition for Cirque du Soleil, and later studied drumming in Ghana for two summers. Once Mystère had an opening, Guidry began playing percussion in the show until he left in 2009 to score Zarkana with Nick Littlemore of Empire of the Sun. According to Guidry, Same Sex Mary asked him to join in 2014 shortly before they were scheduled to perform at a concert.
- Brian Cantrell (guitar) is a Las Vegas music scene veteran, having performed with Junior Anti-Sex League, Red Light School District, and Bee Movie the Band. He joined Same Sex Mary around the same time as Guidry, and will accompany the band on a two-week tour in January 2015 to promote the band's second LP.
- James Howard Adams (guitar, vocals) was raised in Boulder City, where he played the cello in the Garrett Junior High orchestra. Adams later attended both high school and college in Las Vegas, studying music at the Las Vegas Academy, and receiving his degree from the College of Southern Nevada, after which he spent time working in an animal hospital while pursuing musical endeavors. On June 11, 2019, James was elected to one of two available city council positions in Boulder City, NV, beating out incumbent Peggy Leavitt with over 2,000 votes cast in his favor while using the campaign slogan "A new voice - YOURS", which was accompanied by artwork from Las Vegas artist TG Miller.
- Jason Aragon (bass) is one of the founders and organizers of the former Las Vegas music festival known as Neon Reverb, and too is a scene veteran, also playing bass in The Clydesdale, and formerly in Dusty Sunshine along with The Clydesdale's drummer Courtney Carroll.
- Tsvetelina Stefanova (Farfisa, vocals) moved to Las Vegas in 1996 from Bulgaria to pursue a major in piano, guitar and photography at the Las Vegas Academy where she met Adams. In 2009 Stefanova graduated from Northern Arizona University in Flagstaff with a bachelor's degree in biology and a minor in chemistry, before moving back to Boulder City with Adams.

== Releases ==
- The Second Coming (2015)
- XXX (2014)
- Sex Cells (2013)
