= Brian Garth =

American singer-songwriter

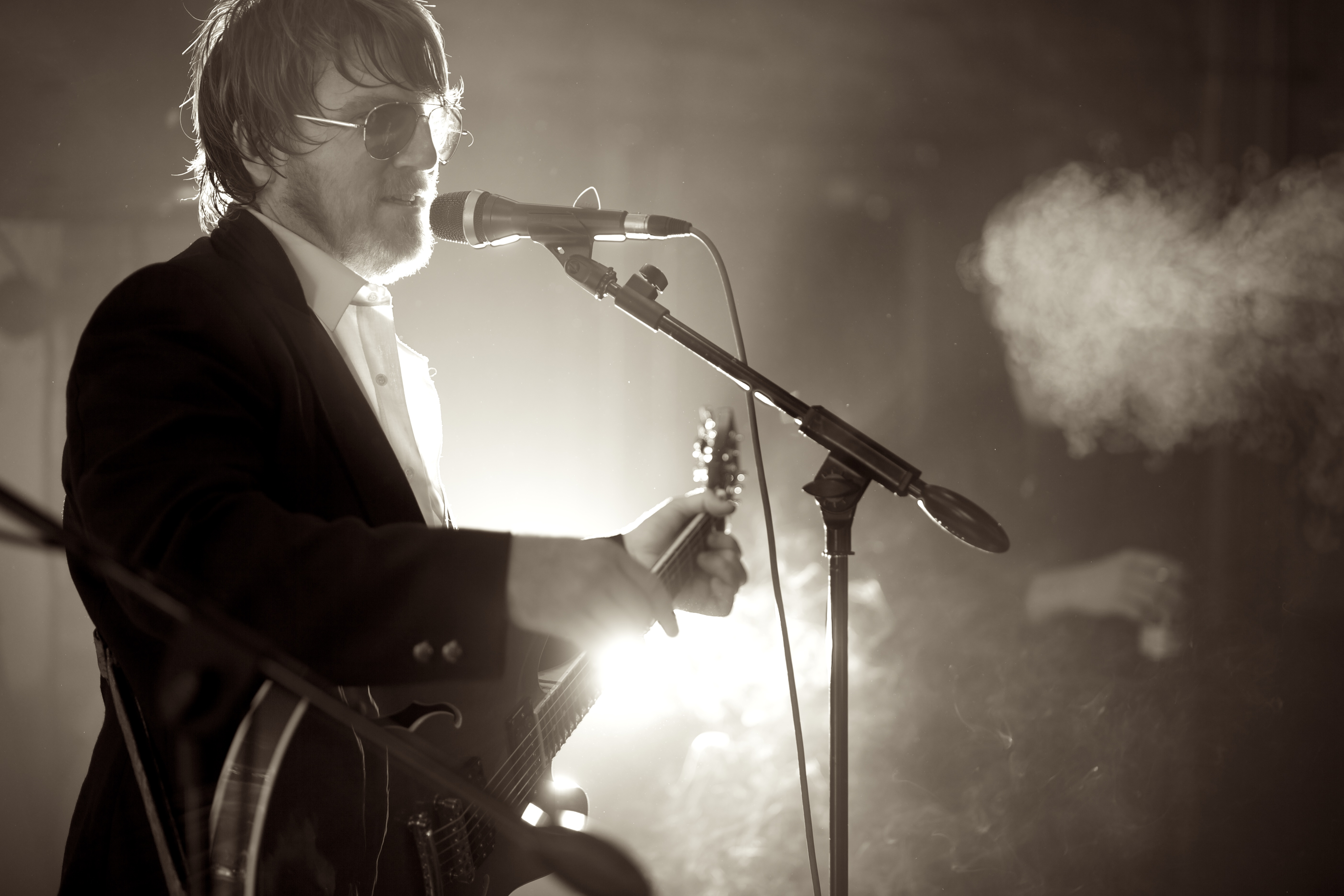
- Garth in 2009

Background information
- Born: September 5, 1979 (age 46); Las Vegas, NV
- Genres: indie folk, indie rock
- Occupations: Recording engineer, musician, producer, teacher
- Instruments: Guitar, Vocals, Bass, Drum machines, Keyboards, Percussion
- Years active: 2001–present

Brian Garth (born 1979) is an American singer, songwriter, guitarist, musician, sound engineer, producer, writer, and teacher from Las Vegas, Nevada. He is most known for his role as a co-founder, guitarist and vocalist of Black Camaro and as the former owner and engineer of Chrome Werewolf, a recording studio in the arts district of Las Vegas.

== Black Camaro ==
Garth formed Black Camaro with Tom Miller in 2001 and began writing and recording songs for the band's first album, which they released in 2003. A close bond formed during the two-year writing experience between Garth and Miller, who continued to write and record original music together. Black Camaro would take on several US tours and release four more albums (Hang Glider, Miniature Panthers, Pistachio Moustachio, Radio Capricorn), and a DVD that spans the first five years of their career titled What's Your Favorite Movie?. Around the same time, Black Camaro also released a soundtrack to the DVD, composed of previously unreleased material, titled B-Sides and C-Sides (2003–2008). As a mainstay in the Las Vegas music community, Black Camaro has influenced other notable local bands to cover their songs during live shows.

On July 4, 2012, Black Camaro released their long-awaited 6th studio album, Black Camaricans. Garth told a reporter, "To me, this is a gift to whoever's been listening to us for this long...In my mind, my goal was to completely please our fan base with it." On January 31, 2013, the band released B-Sides & C-Sides Vol. 2, a 20 track follow-up to Black Camaricans, which consisted mostly of the band's "large back catalog of unrecorded or unreleased material".

Since the release of B-Sides & C-Sides, Vol. 2, Black Camaro has released several LPs, singles, a podcast, and multiple music videos, which include: The Last Menagerie (2014), Xmas Jings (holiday single), The Holy Landfill (holiday single), the 4-part podcast miniseries Standing in Your Shadow (2017), a vinyl release of Protocol of Dreams (2019), and most recently their 2020 LP Daydream Delphi, from which the band donated the sales to charity.

== Film and television ==
Between tours with Black Camaro, Garth worked in the film and television industry. Garth has worked with several stars including Gene Simmons, Ice Cube, Cheech Marin, and Mariah Carey, among others. He appears uncredited as a limo driver in the episode "Wingman" in season two of Gene Simmons Family Jewels, and also appears uncredited as a card player beside Ian Wright in the episode "Las Vegas City Guide" in season six of Globe Trekker.

In 2008, Ian Wright returned to Las Vegas and invited Garth on his new show for the Travel Channel titled America The Wright Way. In the episode, Garth gives Ian, along with the television audience, a tour of the Downtown Arts District's First Friday event. Afterward, Wright heads to the Bunkhouse Saloon where he performs tambourine on stage with Black Camaro during a live concert. [1]

== Chrome Werewolf ==
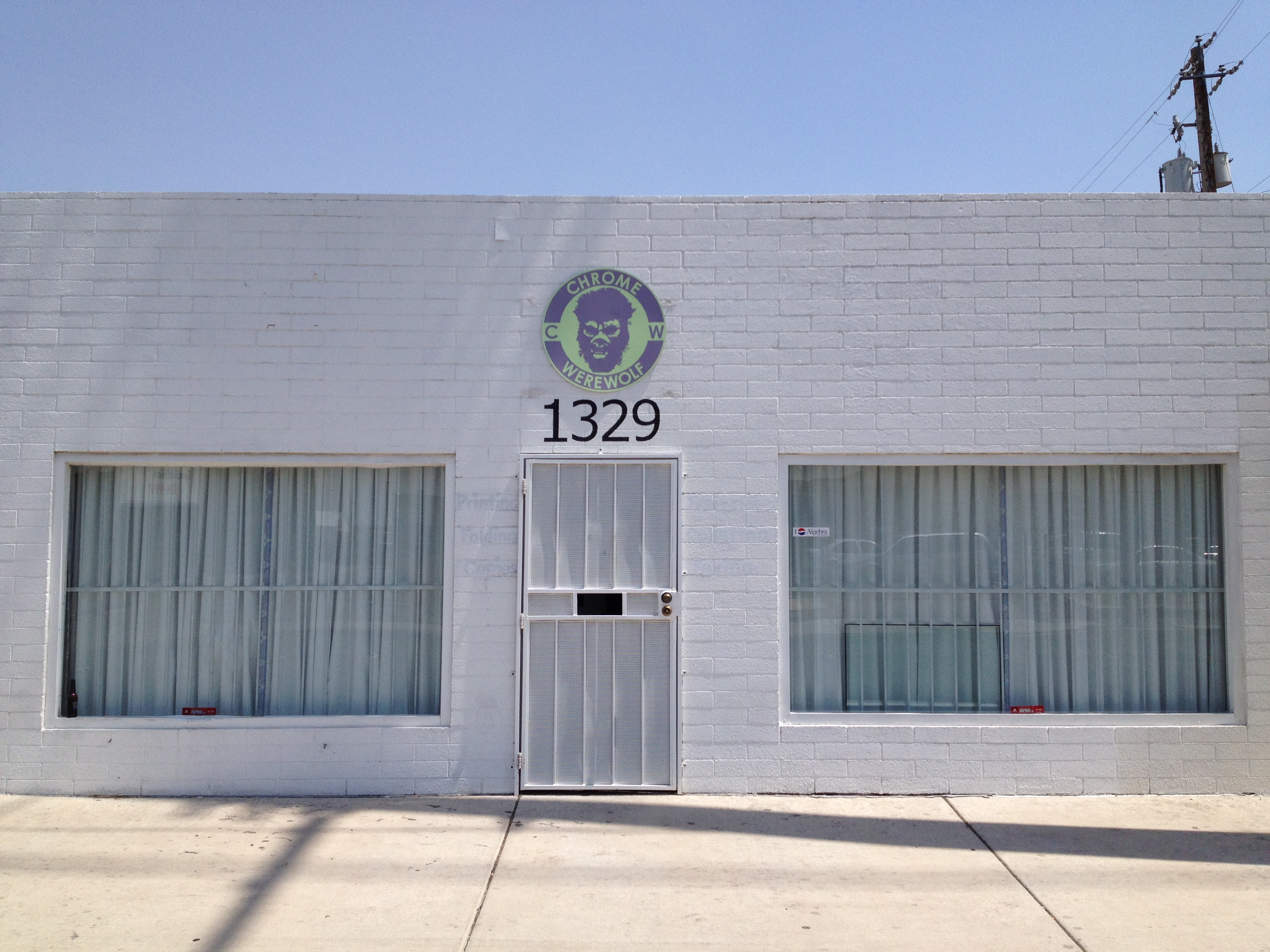
Chrome Werewolf front entrance at 1329 S. Commerce St. in August 2012

From January 2011 to November 2012 Garth was the owner of and sound engineer at Chrome Werewolf, a studio in the arts district of Downtown Las Vegas. In that brief time period, Garth recorded over 50 bands, while also putting the final touches on Black Camaro's 2012 album Black Camaricans. His career has included co-writing and performing with fellow songwriter Thomas Miller on several Black Camaro albums as well as production on multiple other musical acts including Hawaii Music Award winners Haleamano on their self-titled debut album Haleamano (House of Sharks), which won the award for best "Dancehall Reggae" album., and the albums Nocturne (2012) and ...and so it goes (2009) by Las Vegas' The Big Friendly Corporation. Garth appeared on the cover of Las Vegas CityLife alternative-weekly newspaper's music issue in March 2011, and has appeared in several interviews on KNPR public radio in Nevada.

In November 2012, Garth announced his plans to move his gear out of Chrome Werewolf after nearly two years of operation, and into the home of Crazy Chief's Jesse and Roxie Amoroso, owners of Cowtown Guitars, where Garth will record Crazy Chief's debut album. The move will also give Garth, who is a political science major at UNLV, time to focus on school work and his health. He tells a reporter, "I'll always be a musician, I'll always be the guy from Black Camaro, but I also want to be the guy that can get you off of your drug charges or the guy that can help you out with your immigration status."

In March 2013, Garth recorded a benefit concert for Clay Heximer (drummer for The Mapes & Civic Minded Five) who was diagnosed with renal carcinoma. The recording was released as a downloadable album with the proceeds going toward the payment of Heximer's medical bills. In November 2013, Crazy Chief released their debut single Angel Dust on vinyl 7". The song will be featured on the band's full-length album entitled Chrome Werewolf, that the band decided to name after Garth's studio where they began.

== Productions and mixing ==
Garth has worked with several musical artists for over a decade, some of whose projects were produced by Garth, while some were only tracked or mixed, or both tracked and mixed by Garth. The following list attempts to provide a comprehensive list of those artists while also providing details as to the nature of Garth's involvement.

- 4 am Fatality (tracked and mixed)
- Aboriginales (tracked)
- Action Cat (tracked and mixed)
- After School Special (tracked, mixed, and produced)
- Against Me! (live concert multitracking)
- Alexander's Ruskie Trio (tracked and mixed)
- Bacon (tracked and mixed)
- Bad Samaritans (live concert multitracking)
- Bear With Me (tracked, mixed, and produced)
- Battery Holocaust (tracked and mixed)
- Big Friendly Corporation (tracked and mixed)
- Black Beans and Hippie Liver (tracked)
- Black Camaro (tracked, mixed and produced)
- Bob Log III (live concert multitracking)
- Bored Sober (tracked and mixed)
- Braineaters (tracked, mixed, and produced)
- Civic Minded 5 (tracked, mixed, and produced)
- Close To Modern (tracked, and mixed)
- Country Smokers (tracked, mixed, and produced)
- Crazy Chief (tracked and mixed)
- Cute in the Face (tracked and mixed)
- Daniel James of Leopold and His Fiction (tracked)
- Die Laughing (tracked and mixed)
- Dirty Sanchez (tracked and mixed)
- Donna Street Crips (tracked and mixed)
- Dude City (post production tracking)
- Egon (live concert multitracking)
- Elements of Now (tracked and mixed)
- Enkor (tracked and mixed)
- Evil Twin (tracked and mixed)
- Exit Ghost (tracked and mixed)
- Faceplant (tracked and mixed)
- False Cause (tracked and mixed)
- Feather Print (tracked and mixed)
- Fear and Loathing (tracked and mixed)
- Fredward (tracked and mixed)
- Fuzz SoLow (tracked and mixed)
- GFI (live concert multitracking)
- GOC (tracked, mixed, and produced)
- Haleamano (tracked, mixed, co-produced)
- Half Ast (live concert multitracking)
- Highdro (tracked, mixed, and co-produced)
- Hoka Hey (tracked and mixed)
- Humanoids (mastered)
- Jack & The B-Fish (tracked and mixed)
- Jack Johnson of Dude City (tracked and mixed)
- Jacob Smigel Tribute Album (post production)
- Jeremy Gratzke (tracked)
- Josh Ellis' Legba and Sons w/Tara Bratton (tracked)
- Katie Mourning (tracked and mixed)
- Kash Klown (tracked and mixed)
- Knowmadix (tracked and mixed)
- Life's Torment (tracked and mixed)
- My First Rodeo (tracked and mixed)
- My First Rosalie (tracked and mixed)
- Paroxysm (tracked and mixed)
- Penetrator (tracked, mixed, and produced)
- Pet Tigers (tracked and mixed)
- Red Feather (formerly Dirty Somethings) (tracked and mixed)
- Restless Suns (tracked and mixed)
- Rusty Maples (formerly Honest Engines) (tracked and mixed)
- Safekey (tracked and mixed)
- Sara Patterson (tracked and mixed)
- Sheep on a Cliff (tracked and mixed)
- Sin City Ditch Diggers
- Skorchamenza (tracked and mixed)
- Spit Game (tracked and mixed)
- Strange Mistress (tracked, mixed, and produced)
- Suite 666 (tracked and mixed)
- Surrounded By Ignorance (tracked and mixed)
- Swamp Gospel (tracked and mixed)
- The Kill (tracked and mixed)
- The Ku (tracked, mixed, and produced)
- The Mad Caps (mixed)
- The Mapes (tracked and mixed)
- The Marquees (tracked and mixed)
- The Remedies (tracked and mixed)
- The Rooks (tracked and mixed)
- The Psyatics
- The Unwieldies
- The Voodoo Organist (live concert multitracking)
- Tierra Buena (tracked and mixed)
- Toys That Kill (live concert multitracking)
- Trevor and The Joneses (tracked, mixed, and co-produced)
- UNLV student convocations (tracked and mixed)
- Urchins (from Japan) (live concert multitracking)
- Value (tracked and mixed)
- Venom (tracked and mixed)
- Volta Do Mar (live concert multitracking)
- Zach Ryan and the Renegades (mixed)
- Zero One Amazement (tracked and mixed)

== Writing ==
In 2022, Garth's essay I Was a Teenage Teenager appeared in Las Vegas Writes Volume 13: Neon Riffs and Lounge Acts: Las Vegas Writers on Music, an anthology series published annually by Nevada Humanities. In the essay, Garth recalls the formation of his first band in the 1990s, and highlights the events of the band's first concert staged in the Las Vegas desert. The title of the essay is a nod to the Black Camaro song Teenage Teenager, in which the band proclaims, "I was a teenage teenager, hanging in the ditches with the dogs..."
