= Tommy Marth =

Thomas Christian Marth Jr.
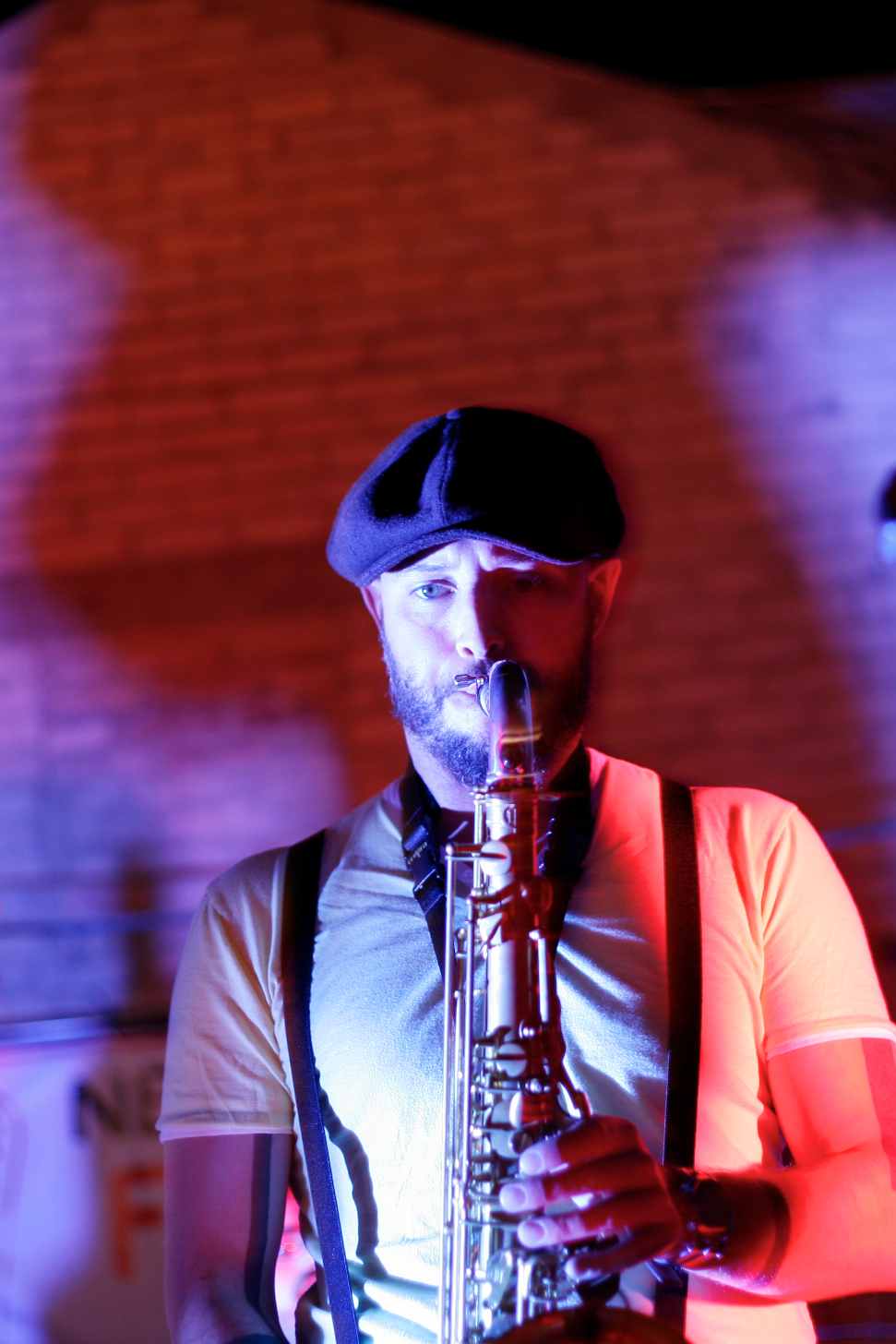
- Marth in 2011

Background information
- Born: November 23, 1978; Las Vegas, Nevada, United States
- Died: April 23, 2012 (aged 33) Las Vegas, Nevada, United States
- Genres: Alternative rock, indie rock
- Occupations: Musician, writer, fashion model, actor
- Instruments: Saxophone, clarinet, wind instruments
- Years active: 1996–2012
- Formerly of: The Killers, The Big Friendly Corporation, Black Camaro, Halloween Town

Thomas Christian Marth Jr. (November 23, 1978 – April 23, 2012) was an American saxophone player, best known for his recordings and live performances with The Killers. He toured widely with the band in 2008–2009, and also played on the albums Sam's Town and Day & Age.

== Early life ==
Tommy Marth was born in Las Vegas, Nevada, and was the middle of three children to Las Vegas singer Diane Eddington and father Thomas Christian Marth Sr., who met Marth's mother while playing stringed instruments throughout Las Vegas in the early 1960s. Tom Sr. taught Marth how to play the drums when he was 4, according to Marth who said in an interview, "When I saw that he liked the thought of me playing I stopped". It wasn't until Marth heard a cassette tape of Stan Getz when he decided to play the saxophone.

Described by his sister as having a familial bond akin to "The Three Musketeers", Marth had a very close relationship with his musician siblings, who include older brother Ryan Marth and younger sister Melissa Marth, both members of the Las Vegas indie band The Big Friendly Corporation.

Tommy attended Chaparral High School in Paradise where he met the future bass player for The Killers, Mark Stoermer in jazz band. While still in high school, Tommy worked as a fashion model for Tommy Hilfiger, Jaguar, and appeared in the video for Sting's Desert Rose. Tommy would also appear in the video for Passion Fruit's Sun Fun Baby in 2000. He later attended the University of Nevada, Las Vegas where he received his bachelor's degree in film.

== Career ==
Early in Marth's career, he was the saxophonist for the Las Vegas All Star Jazz Band while also working as a freelance writer for Las Vegas CityLife. In 2006, Tommy joined his high school friend Mark Stoermer in the studio to record tracks for The Killers' second album Sam's Town. Shortly after the release of the album, Tommy joined The Killers onstage on The Tonight Show with Jay Leno. During this period, when not recording or performing live with The Killers, Tommy worked as both stage manager and entertainment director for a Las Vegas nightclub known as the Freakin' Frog, where he was known for recording live band's performances for free.

In 2008, Tommy recorded saxophone on Black Camaro's Pistachio Moustachio, before returning to the studio with The Killers to record tracks for Day & Age, the band's third studio release. Marth toured with The Killers the following Summer for the Day & Age album and he appears on the Live from the Royal Albert Hall DVD.

Shortly after arriving home from the Day & Age Tour, Tommy returned to his love of writing fiction and playing music with his family. The Big Friendly Corporation would soon enter the studio to record tracks for its album ...And So It Goes (2010), on which Tommy performed saxophone for the song Heaven's on Your Side. Tommy also performed live with Las Vegas musician and tour manager for The Killers Ryan Pardey, in his band Halloween Town, and appears on the band's album Zafra Court (2011).

Since November 2011, Marth had been the Hard Rock's nightlife marketing manager in Las Vegas.

== Death ==
On April 23, 2012, Marth's body was discovered in his Las Vegas, Nevada home with a gunshot wound to the head. The Clark County Coroner subsequently ruled that the gunshot wound was self-inflicted and the cause of death was suicide. The Killers tweeted to their fans soon after receiving the news. The message said, "Last night we lost our friend Thomas Marth. Our prayers are with his family. There's a light missing in Las Vegas tonight. Travel well, Tommy". The Killers drummer Ronnie Vannucci Jr. called Marth "a crazy motherfucker, but in a great way" adding that Marth "would joke about serious stuff, but always throw it into the comic realm. Nobody ever said, 'Tom, you OK, dude?'"

According to the Las Vegas Sun, on the day of Marth's death, The Big Friendly Corporation featured Tommy's performance of "Heaven's on Your Side" on its website, along with comments from Big Friendly member Timothy Styles who said, "It's just been a sad, sad day ... A stand-up guy, a totally great guy and I miss him very much."

In April 2017, on the 5th anniversary of Marth's death, The Big Friendly Corporation released Carry On, Carrion, a 24-song double vinyl album documenting their grieving process over the loss of Marth, with brutally honest lyrics often describing the horrid details of Marth's death.

== Posthumous releases ==
On July 4, 2012, Black Camaro released their album Black Camaricans which features Tommy Marth along with his siblings Melissa and Ryan on the song Phantom of the Moon. Black Camaro's Brian Garth tells Las Vegas CityLife, "We [originally] had this as a song that Tommy dominates with saxophone. But now it's not about that. It's about that it could be the last thing he [recorded]. And I have it, and I have the ability to do this. And I have the Marths as friends to come in and do it."
