= Casey Weldon (disambiguation) =

Casey Weldon may refer to:

- Casey Weldon (born 1969), American footballer
- Casey Weldon (artist), American artist
- Casey Bill Weldon (1901 or 1909–1972), American musician
