= The Big Friendly Corporation =

American indie rock band

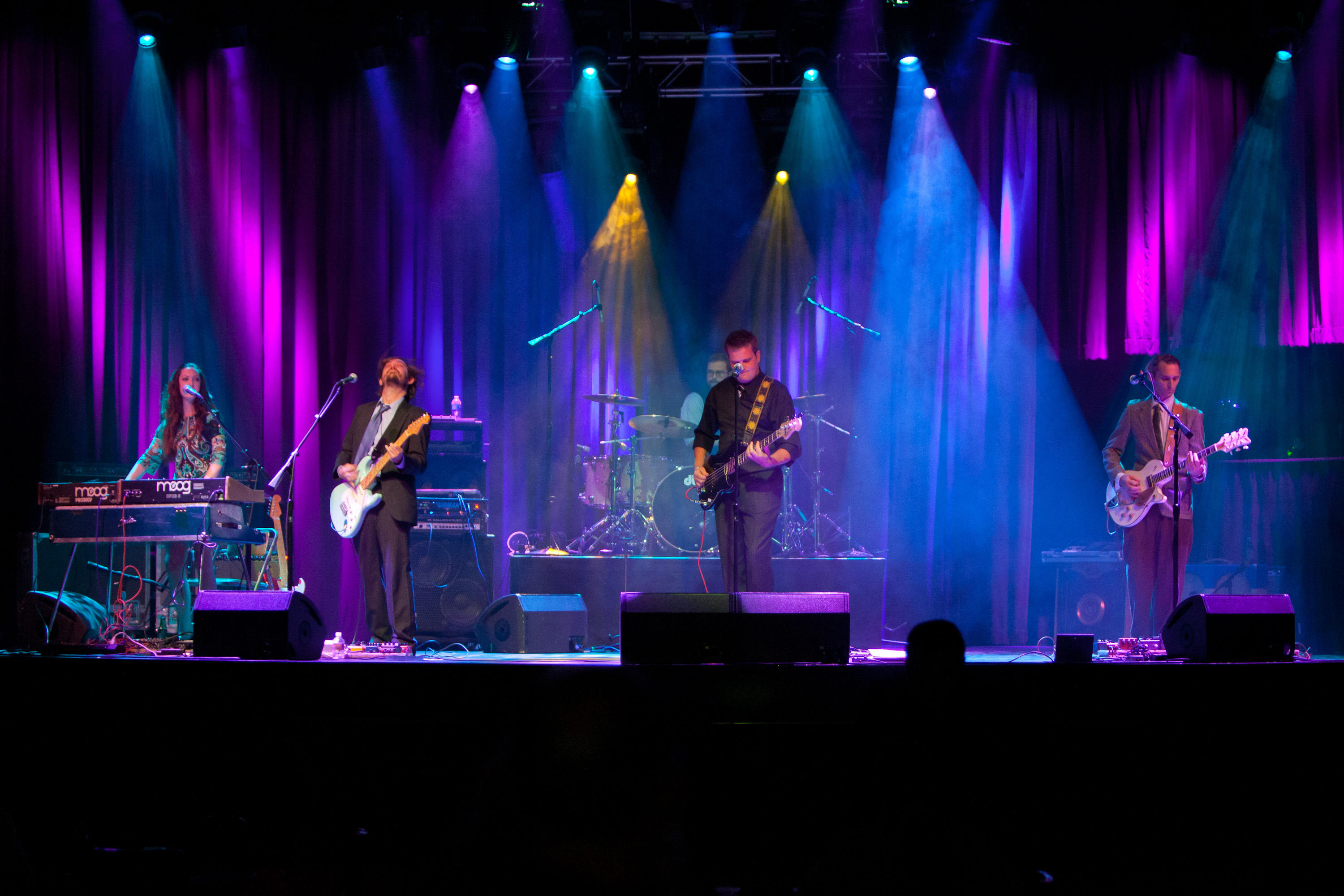
- The Big Friendly Corporation performing live in Las Vegas.

Background information
- Origin: Las Vegas, Nevada, U.S.
- Genres: indie rock, alternative rock
- Years active: 2004–present
- Members: Melissa Marth (Rhodes, vocals); Ryan Marth (guitar, vocals); Jeff Ford (bass, guitar, vocals); Brandon Johnson (drums); Andrew Karasa (guitar)
- Past members: Timothy Styles (bass, vocals); Mike McDonald (drums, vocals); Rick Miller (bass)
- Website: www.thebigfriendlycorporation.com

The Big Friendly Corporation is an indie rock band from Las Vegas, Nevada formed by Ryan Marth and is part of the indie music scene in Las Vegas. Since its formation, the band has acquired members Melissa Marth (keyboards and younger sister to Ryan), Jeff Ford (bass, guitars), Timothy Styles (bass), and newest member Brandon Johnson (drums).

== History ==
The band has released four official albums that include performances by the entire band, and one album recorded and released solely by band founder Ryan Marth. Ryan and Melissa Marth's middle sibling Tommy Marth also performed saxophone on the band's albums. Tommy, who died by suicide in 2012, was best known for his role as saxophonist for The Killers.

In September 2013, the band performed their final show with bassist Tim Styles, who after five years with Big Friendly announced he’d be leaving to focus on his family and his other band, Skorchamenza. The show was held at the Dillinger in Boulder City, Nevada. Big Friendly closed out the show with a solo performance by Styles who sang a cover version of Ty Segall's "Goodbye Bread." Soon after, the band told Las Vegas Weekly's Leslie Ventura that they would be returning to their roots as a foursome, with guitarist Jeff Ford reprising his role as bass player.

On April 29, 2017, The Big Friendly Corporation returned to the stage after a long hiatus, to perform music from Carry On, Carrion, a double vinyl album the band released earlier that month. They were joined on stage by new guitarist (and Melissa Marth's husband) Andrew Karasa of The Clydesdale, and Dustin Apodaca of Dusty Rhodes and the River Band.

The 24-song double album was recorded and mixed by Karasa over a period of five years, beginning with the death of Tommy Marth, and was released on the fifth anniversary of his death. It serves as what the band describes as "a diary of our grieving process [over the past 5 years]", and includes guest performances from members of the Las Vegas music community, including Halloween Town's Ryan Pardey and Black Camaro's Tom Miller.

== Albums ==
=== Studio albums ===
- Carry On, Carrion (2017)
- Nocturne (2012)
- ...And So It Goes (2010)
- Building Better Machines To Replace Us All (2007)

=== Unofficial release ===
- Analog Prototypes vol. 1 (2004)

== Big Friendly Radio ==
As an offshoot of the band, bassist Timothy Styles and keyboardist Melissa Marth formed a web series they named Big Friendly Radio (BFR). The show, which premiered on December 18, 2011, is designed to premiere news about the band and for invited guests to make their own respective announcements. The one-hour show is divided into two segments. In the first half-hour, Styles discusses random subjects with the guest while Marth acts as co-host before beginning the second half-hour segment, where Marth reads the news while Styles and the guest comment.

With Styles' departure from the band, Big Friendly Radio was left in the hands of the Marth siblings. Styles' final episode was a two-part program entitled Episode 69 (pt. 1 & 2): So Long, Timothy Styles.
