= Tom Miller (musician) =

American singer-songwriter

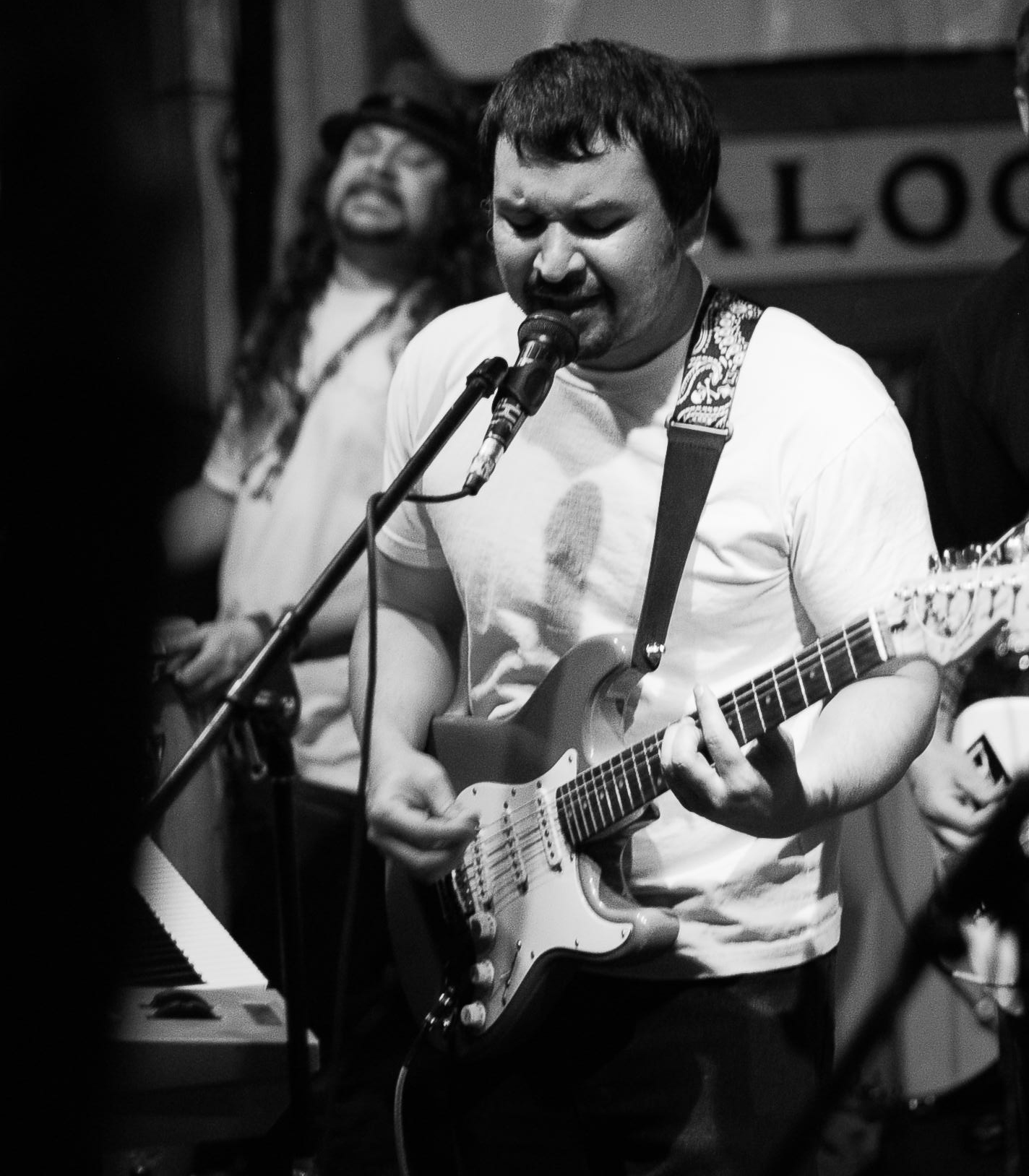
- Black Camaro's Tom Miller (center) and Jimi "Fuzz" Berg (left) performing live

Background information
- Born: September 2, 1976 (age 49); Southeast Asia
- Genres: indie folk, indie rock
- Instruments: Vocals, keyboards, guitar, bass, drum machines
- Years active: 2001–present
- Website: tgmillerart.com

Thomas G. Miller II (born September 2, 1976) is an American musician and visual artist from Las Vegas, Nevada best known as the lead singer and co-creator of Black Camaro. Miller shares songwriting duties with co-creator Brian Garth, while also providing the visual aesthetic for Black Camaro's album art and live concert posters. Miller holds a Bachelor of Fine Arts from UNLV and is an active member of the arts community in Las Vegas.

== Early life ==
Miller was born Thomas Gilbert Miller II in Southeast Asia on September 2, 1976. His father was a helicopter pilot in the US Airforce, and Miller spent most of his early life growing up on military bases. His family relocated to Las Vegas where Tom graduated from the University of Nevada, Las Vegas in 2001.

== Black Camaro ==
Miller formed Black Camaro with Garth in 2001 and began writing and recording songs for the band's first album White People Fucked Up The Blues (2003). A close bond formed during the two-year writing experience between Miller and Garth, who continued to write and record original music together. Black Camaro would take on several US tours and release four more albums (Hang Glider, Miniature Panthers, Pistachio Moustachio, Radio Capricorn), and a DVD that spans the first five years of their career titled What's Your Favorite Movie?. Around the same time, Black Camaro also released a soundtrack to the DVD, composed of previously unreleased material, titled B-Sides and C-Sides (2003–2008). As a mainstay in the Las Vegas music community, Black Camaro has influenced other notable local bands to cover their songs during live shows.

On July 4, 2012, Black Camaro released their long-awaited 6th studio album, Black Camaricans. Garth told a reporter, "To me, this is a gift to whoever's been listening to us for this long...In my mind, my goal was to completely please our fan base with it." On January 31, 2013 the band released B-Sides & C-Sides Vol. 2, a 20 track follow-up to Black Camaricans, which consisted mostly of the band's "large back catalog of unrecorded or unreleased material".

Since the release of B-Sides & C-Sides, Vol. 2, Black Camaro has released several LPs, singles, a podcast, and multiple music videos, which include: The Last Menagerie (2014), Xmas Jings (holiday single), The Holy Landfill (holiday single), the 4-part podcast miniseries Standing in Your Shadow (2017), a vinyl release of Protocol of Dreams (2019), and most recently their 2020 LP Daydream Delphi, from which the band donated the sales to charity.

== Visual art ==
On September 3, 2010, Miller premiered Plexiglass Miracle Scab in Hillary Salon in the arts district of downtown Las Vegas. A CityLife reporter described the show as one that, "places an emphasis on animals as silent commentators of humanity accompanied by a variety of other inscrutable slogans such as 'pineapple corduroy bone,' matched with bold color and graphic schemes." Black Camaro performed at the event on its opening night.

In November 2012 Miller (as T.G. Miller) premiered Acrylic Satanic featuring "the materials and simplifying aesthetic of sign-making – including wood, vinyl, straightforward text – to the production of gallery art."

== Tito Mojito ==
On August 31, 2015, Miller released his first solo album under the pseudonym Tito Mojito and the New Conquerors. The nine song album Infinite Love borrows its sound from surf and garage-rock bands, and was released "lazily and on the down low" according to Miller, whose press release was designed to appear as though its namesake stole Miller's computer and used his email list to invite people to listen.
