= Saab Lofton =

American novelist

Saab Lofton (born March 13, 1969) is an author, cartoonist and radio personality. He lives in Seattle, Washington, United States.

Lofton graduated from The Evergreen State College in Olympia, Washington. After graduation, Lofton moved to Las Vegas where he hosted the "Saab Lofton Power Hour" for KLAV 1230 AM radio and wrote a column for the Las Vegas CityLife. In 2002 and 2003, he won of the three awards for "Best Local Non-Staff Column" from the Nevada Press Association.

Lofton's work includes A.D., a novel he wrote while a student at San Francisco State University. Lofton's second novel is called Battle Neverending. Lofton formerly published a column in the discontinued Seattle Sinner, an alternative newspaper, and self-publishes an underground comic book called "Rufus the Black Cat".

== Publications ==
- A.D, Gualala, CA, US: III Pub, 1995, ISBN 978-0-9622937-8-8, OCLC 34039004
- Battle Neverending, Seattle, WA: Share the Wealth Production, 1997, OCLC 42058586
- Defend the Archive!, Share the Wealth Production, 2017, ASIN B074VFVGQZ
- Helen of Melbourne, Share the Wealth Production, 2020, ASIN B08DLFX217
