= Chip Mosher =

American writer (1947–2021)

- Born: Charles Jon Mosher; June 23, 1947; Chillicothe, Ohio
- Died: November 15, 2021 (aged 74); Las Vegas, Nevada
- Occupations: Newspaper columnist Novelist; Poet; Teacher
- Writing career
- Genres: Nonfiction, fiction, poetry
- Subjects: Education, current affairs
- Notable works: America, Please!
- Notable awards: Nobel Educator of Distinction; Nevada Arts Council fellowship
- Website: lasvegascitylife.com/sections/opinion/socrates-sodom

Charles Jon "Chip" Mosher (June 23, 1947 – November 15, 2021) was an educator, poet, author and newspaper columnist who wrote social commentary about education and history, as well as satirical fiction.

== Early life and education ==
Mosher, who grew up in Chillicothe in Southern Ohio, spent the 10th grade at Staunton Military Academy, and then transferred to Salem High School, where he wrote for the school newspaper, graduating in 1965.

In 1969, Mosher received a bachelor's degree in philosophy from Mount Union College in Alliance, Ohio. He attended a master's program at Duke Divinity School, where he played basketball and acted in the Duke Players, from 1969 to 1972. He earned a master's in education from the University of Nevada, Las Vegas in 1998.

== Career ==
Mosher was a volunteer teacher in Thessaloniki, Greece from 1972 to 1974. In 1988, he began teaching history at a high-risk school within the Clark County School District in Las Vegas.

Beginning in 2005, he wrote a weekly column titled "Socrates in Sodom" for Las Vegas CityLife, an alternative newsweekly, until the paper folded in 2014. The tag line at the end of his column stated that he was "a simple classroom teacher." He also wrote a monthly almanac for CityLife. In 2018, he began writing an almanac for Desert Companion magazine. The column, titled "Random Access Memory," also appears on Nevada Public Radio's website, which publishes the monthly magazine.

As a teacher who wrote about the school district he worked for, the opinions in his column caused controversy. As a result, he was regularly interviewed about education issues. In the early 2000s, Mosher predicted cheating would occur on a national scale with the corporate reform of education. "It’s no longer about the students or teachers. It’s all about money,” the Las Vegas Weekly quoted him as saying after a Washington, D.C. cheating scandal and another one in Nevada in 2014.

=== Bibliography ===
Mosher's chapter “Memoir of a Modern Woman in the Modern World” was included in the book The Anarchy of Memories: Short Fiction Featuring Las Vegas Icons, which was released by Huntington Press in October 2015. The book was part of a Las Vegas Writes project, a compilation of short fiction featured at the annual Vegas Valley Book Festival (since renamed the Las Vegas Book Festival).

Mosher's contribution to the 2010 fictional book Dead Neon: Tales of Near-future Las Vegas, published by the University of Nevada Press, was described by Publishers Weekly as "a parody of Harlan Ellison in C.J. Mosher's "A Girl and Her Cat... ."

In 2005, he released a CD titled America, Please!, which includes 26 poems and one sci-fi short story.

== Awards ==
- 2011 Nobel Educator of Distinction Award for "excellence in teaching" from the National Society of High School Scholars.
- 2009 3rd-place award in the Nevada Press Association's “Better Newspaper Contest" for a CityLife column.
- 2008 1st-place journalism award from the Nevada Press Association for his CityLife education column.
- In 2004 Honorable Mention for a 2005 Nevada Arts Council fellowship.
