= Majestic Repertory Theatre =

American theater in Nevada

- Interactive map of Majestic Repertory Theatre
- Address: 1217 S Main St; Las Vegas, Nevada
- Coordinates: 36.156872°N 115.153545°W
- Owner: Troy Heard

Construction
- Opened: 2016

Website
- Majestic Repertory Theatre

Majestic Repertory Theatre is a storefront theater in Las Vegas, Nevada, located within 18b The Las Vegas Arts District. It was founded in 2016 by Troy Heard, following creative differences with his then employer Onyx Theatre.

Majestic Rep has premiered works including Amber Ruffin's Bigfoot: The Musical in 2018 along with The Sandman by Richard Oberacker and Robert Taylor in 2021.

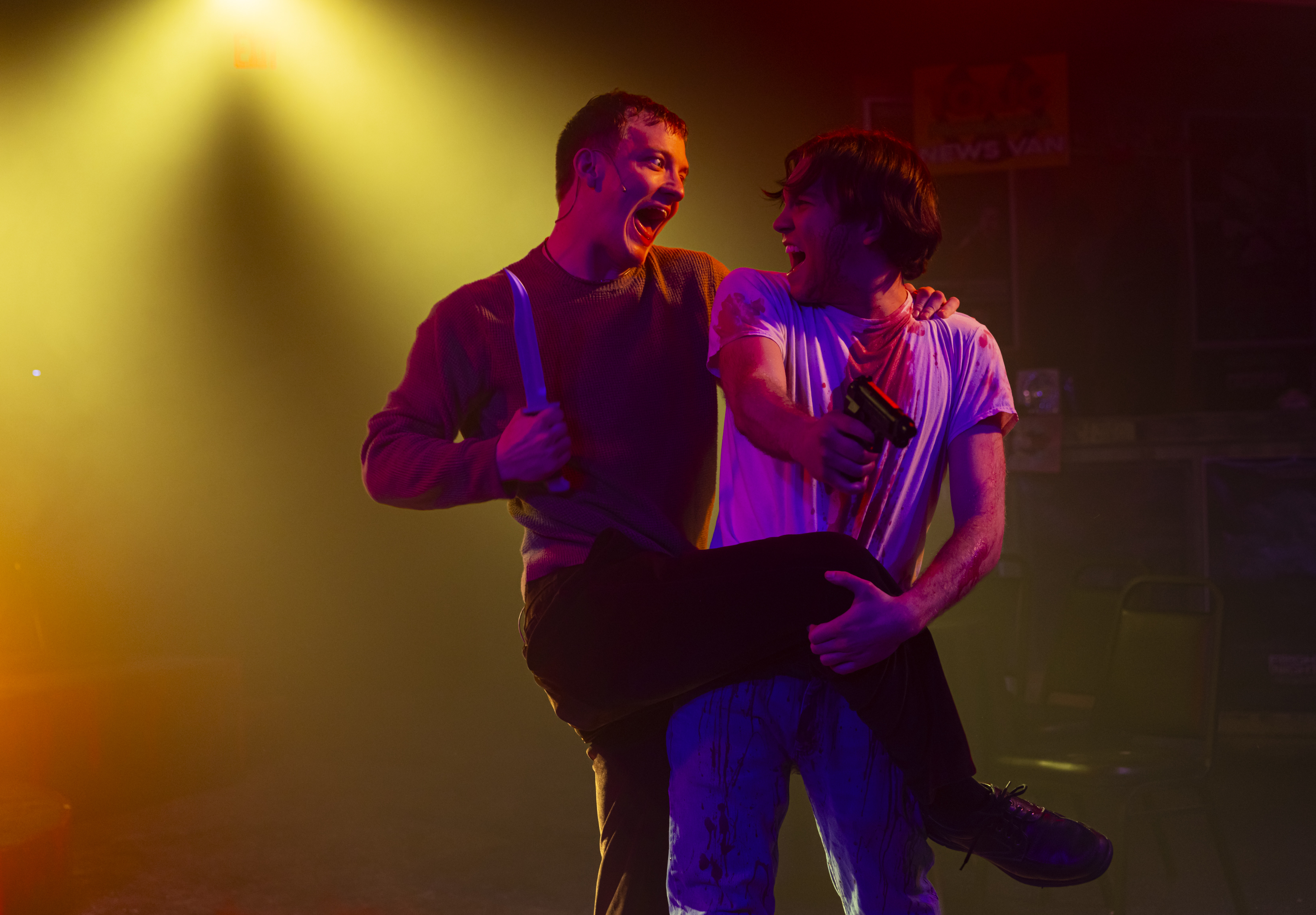
Joey Derby and Ray Winters in SCREAM'D

Majestic Rep gained a large following in 2023 when Heard's world premiere production SCREAM'D: An Unauthorized Musical Parody went viral on TikTok earning millions of views.

Majestic Repertory Theater is one of the first theatre companies in Nevada to create original immersive theater productions, including collaborations with headliner Usher and art collective Meow Wolf.
