= Casey Weldon (artist) =

American artist

Casey Weldon is an American artist best known for his use of melancholy and humor in conjunction with the iconography of modern pop culture, leading his critics to designate his style as "post-pop surrealism." Weldon's style has been likened to that of André Breton and René Magritte. His most famous work is a series of paintings known as Four-Eyed Cats. Weldon also hand painted and animated Black Camaro's music video for their song Zebraska.

== Early life ==
Weldon was born in southern California where he attended the Art Center College of Design in Pasadena, California. After graduating, he moved to Las Vegas, Nevada, where he opened his own studio. Weldon later relocated to Brooklyn, New York and Portland, Oregon.
