= Echopark Guitars =

American guitar and base manufacturer

- Industry: Musical instrument manufacturing
- Founded: In Echo Park, Los Angeles, California
- Headquarters: Detroit, Michigan, United States

Echopark Guitars is an American guitar and bass manufacturer which started in Echo Park, Los Angeles, CA. Now located in Detroit, Michigan, the instruments are made by Gabriel Currie, who previously worked for G&L Musical Instruments and Tak Hosono at Hosono Guitar Works before starting Echopark Guitars. Echopark players include Joe Perry and Bradley Whitford of Aerosmith, Josh Homme of Queens of the Stone Age, actor Johnny Depp, and the German guitarist Azhar Kamal. A limited number of Echopark guitars are produced each year. Currie utilizes aged and in some cases, ancient woods in the production of the instruments.
