= Black Camaro =

American indie rock band

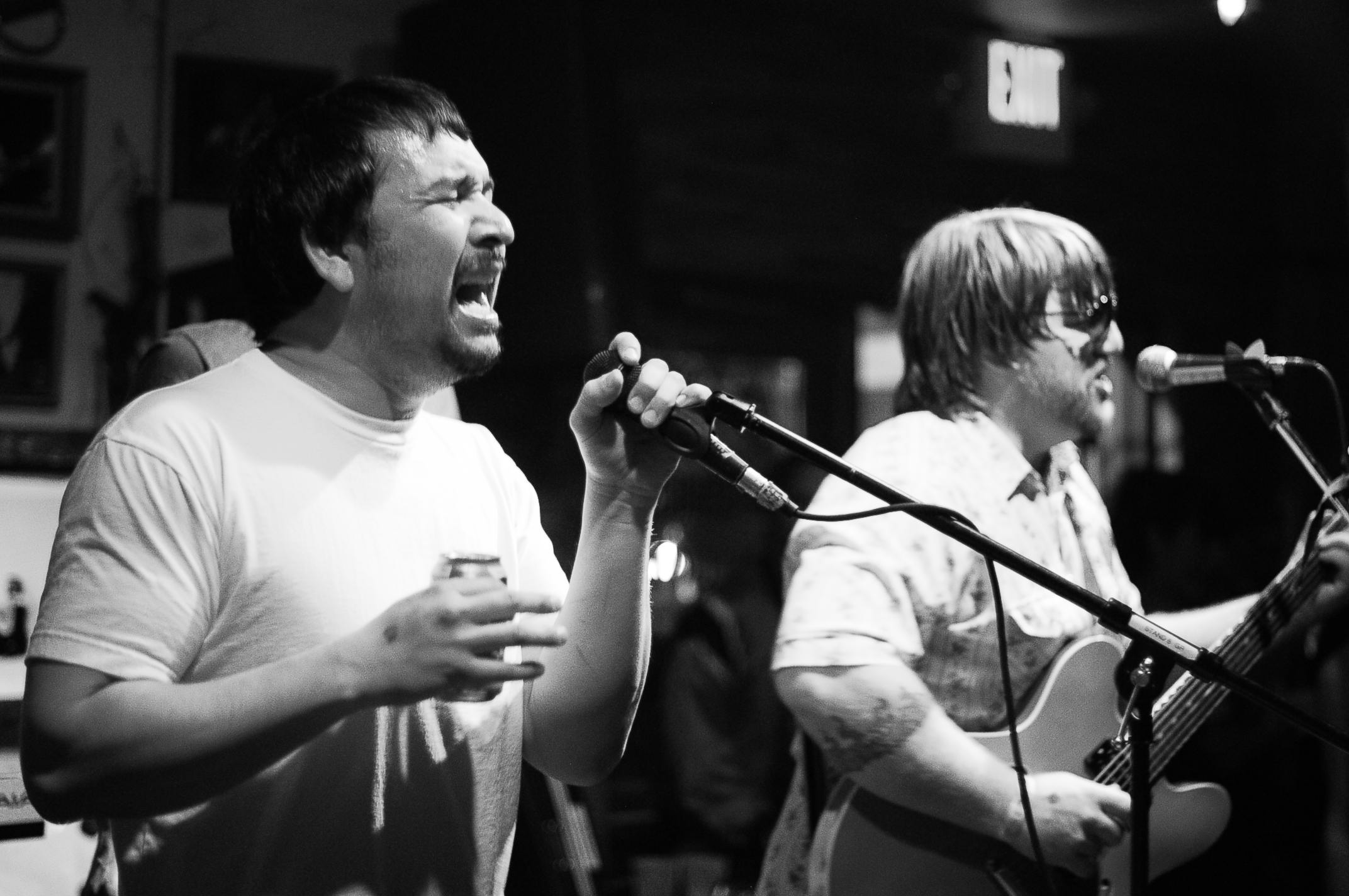
- Black Camaro's Tom Miller (left) and Brian Garth (right) performing live

Background information
- Origin: Las Vegas, Nevada, United States
- Genres: Indie folk, indie rock, alternative rock
- Years active: 2003 - present
- Label: Running in Place Records
- Members: Brian Garth; James "Fuzz" Berg; Jordan Robins; Scott Trujillo; Tom Miller
- Past members: See "Band Members"
- Website: www.blackcamaromusic.com

Black Camaro is an American indie rock band that formed in Las Vegas, Nevada in 2001. The band's founding members are guitarist and vocalist Brian Garth and keyboardist and vocalist Tom Miller.

== Career ==
=== White People Fucked Up The Blues ===
In 2001, Garth and Miller began recording Black Camaro’s first album, White People Fucked up the Blues in a living room in North Las Vegas on a 16 track digital recorder. In 2003, the two members self-released the album in a handmade run of 300 CDs, which were eventually discovered by music journalist Jarret Keene in Balcony Lights, a local record store the duo frequented. Soon after the release, Las Vegas CityLife alternative-weekly newspaper published an album review, written by Keene, exposing the music to a larger fan base.

Black Camaro's first live performance came in the winter of 2003. Musical artist and writer Ted Sablay then conducted an interview with the band for CityLife during which the duo attempted to scare Sablay by assembling a tower of Budweiser cans, bongs and a double-barreled shotgun on a coffee table in their garage where the interview took place.

With the addition of Chris Rogers (bass), Gary Wright (drums), Jimi "Fuzz" Berg (Percussion), and Mike “Lazer” Lavin (sound), Black Camaro embarked on its first tour in Spring 2004. The members of the band collaborated on a diary of their tour that appeared on their website. Keene, who would later write about Black Camaro in his book The Underground Guide to Las Vegas, published the diary in CityLife's music issue.

=== Hang Glider ===
After returning home from the tour, Black Camaro moved their equipment into the 910, which were two side-by-side storage units converted into a recording studio that also served as a rehearsal space for the band, and had no bathroom and no air conditioning. Rogers and Wright left the band shortly after the tour, and the remaining members welcomed drummer Jeremy Lamanna into the band, as well as bass player Jason Wilda from Recess Records bands Civic Minded Five and The Mapes.

After being approached by film director Kelly Schwarze about creating a soundtrack for his independent film, Black Camaro immediately began working on recordings of original score for the Vision Dynamics Entertainment film The Indie-Pendant. The soundtrack later became Black Camaro’s second LP Hang Glider, and was released in June 2005 along with the film.

One review of the album alludes to the band's silliness by making several marijuana related puns, while a writer for Tucson Weekly mentions how the band created "this wild musical world teeming with seedy characters," and compared Hang Glider to the band's first album calling it "darker, more subversive and a heck of a lot longer, although the sense of humor is still intact."

Hang Glider 2025

To celebrate the 10th anniversary of Hang Glider (2005), the band “remixed and actually mastered” the songs that appeared on the original release, and claim on their website that the new version "presents the same lengthy album sans the lazy mistakes and gratuitous secret tracks", blaming the crude nature of the original release on the naivete of their younger selves, and the apparent laziness that is inherent in young musicians.

=== Miniature Panthers ===
In October 2005, Black Camaro released Miniature Panthers, an EP of all new material. Written and recorded in under a month, Miniature Panthers marked the first time Black Camaro would record an entire release as a full band, with Jason Wilda joining on bass and Jeremy Lamanna on drums. Album credits show previous albums having been mainly tracked by Garth and Miller with the addition of several guest players. In August 2008, the album reached #2 on Tucson’s Toxic Ranch Records top sales list.

Miniature Panthers: The Motion Picture

In 2006, the band again worked with director Kelly Schwarze on Miniature Panthers: The Motion Picture. After renting a warehouse next door to their local Sam Ash Music, Black Camaro constructed sets and began filming scenes written by the band to coincide with the EP. The majority of the project was shot as live action starring Jeff Ford of The Big Friendly Corporation in the lead role, while the midpoint of the video veers off into a cartoon sequence that was hand painted and animated by artist Casey Weldon. Behind-the-scenes footage of the production shows Black Camaro’s film crew traveling to Hollywood, CA to shoot some scenes.

The Black Camaro Variety Show

In February 2008, the band performed at the Black Camaro Variety Show, an event that was part of a larger event known as Black Camaro Weekend, held at The Bunkhouse in the Fremont East district of Las Vegas. The show consisted of several acts that incorporated Black Camaro’s material in some way. Created to look like a game show, the Variety Show was hosted by Jewish Dave and included three acts of Black Camaraoke (karaoke versions of the band's songs), a spoken word artist reading lyrics from one of the band’s songs, and actors dressed as God and Satan. During the event, the band raffled off a custom Black Camaro iPod and finally premiered Miniature Panthers: The Motion Picture as the final act before performing a full live set. The Variety Show would mark the band’s first live performance with drummer Trujillo, and it helped to fund their next project, which would find the band traveling to Eugene, OR to record tracks for Pistachio Moustachio.

=== Pistachio Moustachio ===
In June 2008, after several months of writing and pre-production, Garth and Miller traveled to Eugene, OR, met with sound engineer Mike “Lazer” Lavin, and the band entered Gung-Ho Studio. Gung-Ho provided the duo with access to high-end studio equipment, vintage instruments, and a change of environment from the living rooms and storage sheds. Garth would later recall, “Most of the record was recorded in Eugene, Oregon, to have that rainy influence” which helped give the album a “more psychedelic-y” sound.

After the sessions, the tracks were brought back to Las Vegas for additional tracking with the rest of the band at the 910. Once the sessions were complete, Black Camaro released their new EP Pistachio Moustachio at a dual CD release party with Las Vegas band The Skooners, who released their EP Blow On My Ha Ha. The event cost $10 and attendees received an EP and a live set from each band.

=== Radio Capricorn ===
In June 2009, the band was asked to play an all ages birthday show at The Gypsy Den on First Friday the following July 3. The band recorded Radio Capricorn to give away to 200 people at the event who had never heard Black Camaro before. The 25 track CD is designed to sound like a radio show that plays Black Camaro’s catalog all day long. With several hosted shows and guest appearances, as well as comical commercials for phony drug stores and 12 of the band's songs, the best-of album quickly received praise from as far north as Oregon.

On July 13, 2009, KPSU college radio in Portland played the entire album from beginning to end, only stopping to remind listeners that they were in fact not tuned in to KDIG, which are the call letters to the station on the album. The album also appears on multiple 2009 top ten lists.

=== What's Your Favorite Movie? ===
In 2011 Black Camaro compiled their first four studio albums, a slew of outtakes, some live recordings, two music videos and a short film on their DVD What's Your Favorite Movie?. The DVD spans the band's career from 2003’s White People Fucked Up the Blues through 2008’s Pistachio Moustachio, and includes all of the band's music video, including Miniature Panthers: The Motion Picture and a making-of featurette called Behind The Claws: The making of Miniature Panthers.

B-Sides and C-Sides (2003-2008)

To coincide with the release of the DVD, Black Camaro released B-Sides and C-Sides (2003-2008), a compilation album that also spans the first five years of the band, and consists of live tracks from the Spring 2004 tour and unreleased B-sides and outtakes.

=== Black Camaricans ===
On July 4, 2012 Black Camaro released their third LP Black Camaricans. The album is Black Camaro's first LP since 2005's Hang Glider. The band recorded the album over a three-year period that spanned two recording studios and multiple lineup changes.

The album features members of The Big Friendly Corporation, Melissa and Ryan Marth, on the song Phantom of the Moon, as well as their late brother Tommy Marth, who also played saxophone with the Killers. Garth asked the Marth siblings to record parts on the song after their brother Tommy committed suicide shortly before the album's release. Tommy had already performed saxophone on the song.

Once released, the album received praise from several music writers and was featured on UK label Choose My Music's New Music For Monday blog. Las Vegas CityLife's Mike Prevatt voted it one of the best albums of 2012 and the album won the band the Best of Las Vegas title in the Las Vegas Review-Journal in early 2013.

The song Summer of Dirt from the album appears on the Zia Records compilation You Heard Us Back When Vol. 7 that was released to coincide with Record Store Day 2013. The album sold for $3 with proceeds from the sales going to HALO Animal Rescue, an organization that helps with animal adoptions.

The song Charlemagne from the album appears on the Choose My Music Records compilation album New Music For Mondays Vol. 2 that was released on May 11, 2013.

=== B-Sides & C-Sides Vol. 2 ===
In January 2013 Black Camaro released their second B-sides record B-Sides & C-Sides Vol.2 that brought together leftovers from the Black Camarican sessions as well as songs from the previous 5 years. Where their first B-Sides record left off, Vol. 2 began. Though an outtakes album, critics still praised the "consistently fresh" and "immaculate production."

Michael Landon 2004 Western Region Semi-Finals

In July 2013 Black Camaro released a 60-minute video on YouTube documenting the band’s 2004 tour across the U.S. in support of debut album White People Fucked Up the Blues. Michael Landon 2004 Western Region Semi-Finals is a collage of live video footage combined with audio mixes from a 16-track recorder that accompanied the band on the road, and quirky “on the bus” moments sprinkled throughout. The band told a writer that they admired the actor of the same name and that the title was intentionally "quirky and confusing".

The Black Camaro Variety Show III

On New Year's Eve 2013, Black Camaro partook in their third installment of the Black Camaro Variety Show. The event was described by Jason Bracelin of the Las Vegas Review-Journal as having "skits involving dudes with boxes on their heads playing UNO, a Navajo version of Auld Lang Syne, some stand-up comedy that may or may not be deliberately unfunny and plenty more. As with the other two installments of the Black Camaro Variety Show, the band ended the event with a live performance.

=== The Last Menagerie ===
On December 25, 2014 Black Camaro released The Last Menagerie to surprised fans, as the 11 song album was kept under wraps until it appeared on the band's website at midnight on Christmas morning with a "name your price" option. With Miller describing the sound of Menagerie as being "like dust," and Garth describing it as "gray," the album was written to evoke the chill and gloom of the winter season in which it was released. Opting for a more stripped down record, the band wrote the songs quickly, and in November 2014 gave themselves a Christmas deadline.

While recording the bulk of the album in about a week, Garth and Miller utilized their home recording studios as well as a professional studio, Digital Insight in Las Vegas, to create what Miller later described as a "lonely, far-off...earthy" record, while Garth claims to have derived his inspiration for the album from the band's past recordings on 4-track cassette, invoking the "clicks and pops and snaps and ugly hissing sounds" of that medium.

=== Protocol of Dreams ===
On Valentine's Day 2019, Black Camaro released the 12-song Protocol of Dreams on vinyl, their first vinyl release, and their first endeavor with Las Vegas-based label Running In Place Records (RIP). The album's single Out in the Rain appears on several streaming playlists, including the new Slingshot playlist by NPR, the KNPR State of Nevada Playlist, and the Doubtful Sounds Web Stream. The band released a music video for the single in April 2019, written and animated by guitarist Brian Garth, with artwork hand drawn by singer TG Miller.

Protocol of Dreams was well received by critics, being described as "incredibly palatable" by Razorcake magazine, who praised the "slick production, and thoughtful songs", while comparing the album's sound to Beatles pop and Oasis. The album drew comparisons to Oingo Boingo, Ariel Pink, and The Oh Sees by punk magazine Maximum Rock and Roll, who referred to the album's "always poppy and somewhat unconventional" songs as "unexpected", while Doubtful Sounds said of the album's single Out in the Rain, "It's knotty, dynamic and burns a hole in your synapses".

=== Daydream Delphi ===
Released on July 4, 2020, Daydream Delphi is loosely based on the band's 2016 live residency at Las Vegas venue The Bunkhouse Saloon, and includes recorded dialog in the form of scenes from a fictional television soap opera, sandwiched between 10 original songs. The album was promoted with an animated advertisement resembling the intro to a television show.

On May 18, 2021, Las Vegas-based NHL team the Vegas Golden Knights chose ‘’Guest Star in a One Man Show’’ from Daydream Delphi as the featured track of the night at their play-off game at T-Mobile Arena.

== Band members ==
Current

- Brian Garth – vocals, lead guitar, bass, engineering (2001–present)
- Jimi “Fuzz” Berg – percussion, guitar, vocals (2003–present)
- Jordan Robins - bass, vocals (2012–present)
- Scott Trujillo – drums, vocals (2008–present)
- Tom Miller – vocals, keyboards, guitar (2001–present)

Former

- Alan Norris (2005-2012)
- Christian Rogers - bass (2004)
- Dave Avillion - drums (2006)
- Gary Wright - drums, drum machines (2004)
- Jason Wilda - bass, vocals (2004-2011)
- Jeremy Lamanna - drums (2004-2006)
- Rick Miller - bass (2009)

Non-member album credits

- Adam Mullin – bass on Where Dead People Live
- Ashley Mein - listed as cast member on Daydream Delphi
- Blair Dewane - vocals on Mama Nature
- Brian Thornton – drums on Andramada, water bottle on Wait Until Dark, beat and vocal on Candy Corns
- Brooke Latham - spoken words on Meet Me In Vietnam
- Carey Kaplan – tambourine on Where Dead People Live and spoken words on Baby Alligators
- Chani Riiell Leavitt - vocal on Convergence of the Twain
- Christy Graviet – vocal on JoJo’s Theme and The Ballad of Reggie Black
- Conrad Lochner - spoken words on Put That Bottle Down
- D. Lorean - papes on I'll Kill You If You Scream
- Dave Post - backup vocals on Summer of Dirt
- David "Jewish Dave" Rosen - voice acting on Radio Capricorn
- Eduardo Bejarano – didgeridoo on Miniature Panthers
- Giorgio Castaldo - voice acting on Radio Capricorn
- James Norman - Drums on Daydream Delphi tracks When You're Finally Home, The Edge of an Edge, Black is Black is Black, and People in the Sandstone
- Jason Dickinson - Hammond B3 on Sal's Drugs 2, electric piano/celesta/clarinet on Serenade of Phantoms
- Jason Trujillo - backup vocals on Meet Me In Vietnam
- Jeff Murphy - stalkings and stockings on Karaoke Killed The Colonel
- Joseph Brailsford – accordion on Meet Me In Vietnam
- Joseph “JoJo” Arcuri – bass on Wait Until Dark, Dressed In Gold, Silver Switchblade
- Justin Plehn - backup vocals on JoJo’s Theme
- K. Kilfeather - Drums on Dead Generation as it appears on Protocol of Dreams, and listed as cast member on Daydream Delphi
- Karoline Khamis - strings on Bronze Metal
- Kelly Schwarze - backup vocals on Meet Me In Vietnam
- Kendall Poe - speaks French on Bronze Metal
- Maryam Haddad - violin on The Drop
- Melissa Marth - Rhodes Piano, and vocals on Phantom of the Moon
- Melysa Espino - voice acting on Radio Capricorn
- Mike Garth - drums on Apple Core
- Richard De La Riva – trumpet on Rendezvous and Apple Core
- Richard Ortiz - backup vocals on Meet Me In Vietnam
- Ryan Marth - Suzuki Q Chord on Phantom of the Moon
- Ryan P. Farnsworth - backup vocals on Meet Me In Vietnam
- Skylar Roach - trumpet on Buffalo Road
- Ted Rader - listed as cast member on Daydream Delphi
- Theta Naught - Improvisational musical performance on Hang Glider
- Timothy Styles - voice acting on Radio Capricorn
- Tommy Marth – saxophone on Volcano and Phantom of the Moon
- Trinity Edmundson - voice acting on Radio Capricorn, vocal on (There's a) Narc In Lorenzi Park

== Discography ==
Studio LPs

- Daydream Delphi (2020)
- Protocol of Dreams (2019)
- Standing In Your Shadow: A Podcast (2017)
- Hang Glider 2025 (2015)
- The Last Menagerie (2014)
- B-Sides & C-Sides Vol.2 (2013)
- Black Camaricans (2012)
- B-sides and C-sides (2003-2008) (2011)
- Radio Capricorn (2009)
- Hang Glider (2005)
- White People F****d Up The Blues (2003)

Studio EPs

- Chrome Werewolf (unofficial) (2012)
- Pistachio Moustachio (2008)
- Miniature Panthers (2005)

Holiday

- Christmas, Carol (Dec-2021)
- The Holy Landfill (Dec-2017)
- Xmas Jings (Dec-2015)

Compilations

- New Music For Mondays Vol. 2 (2013) (released by: Choose My Music Records)
- You Heard Us Back When Vol. 7 (2013) (released by: Zia Records for Record Store Day 2013)
- Show Me Blurry Lines: a tribute to Jacob Smigel (2011)

Music Videos

- Daydream Delphi Intro (animated short)
- Out in the Rain (animated video)
- Miniature Panthers: The Motion Picture (video)
- The Drip (video)
- The Trouble With Pain (video)
- What's Your Favorite Movie? (DVD)
- Michael Landon 2004 Western Region Semi-Finals (video)
- This Is Your Life James "Fuzz" Berg (mockumentary style video)
- Convergence of the Twain (video)
- The Cave (video)

Feature film, television, & documentary appearances

- America The Wright Way (television)
- Ride Report (documentary)
- The Indie-Pendant (film)
