= The Clydesdale =

- Origin: Las Vegas, Nevada
- Genres: Rock
- Years active: 2005–present
- Members: Paige Overton; Andrew Karasa; Jason Aragon; Courtney Carroll; Kid Meets Cougar

The Clydesdale was an indie band from Las Vegas, Nevada who grew prominent in the independent Las Vegas alt country and cowpunk community. Their sound is described by Rolling Stone as "bluegrass rock" fit for "the soundtrack to a western directed by Quentin Tarantino." Their members, who perform dressed in western wear, include Paige Overton and her trademark "ever-evolving beehive" hairdo (vocals, guitar), Andrew Karasa, a carpenter who builds his own instruments and once cut his middle finger off with a table saw a mere week before performing with the band (vocals, guitar), Jason Aragon, who co-created Las Vegas' Neon Reverb Music Festival (bass), and Courtney Carroll, who has played in several Las Vegas bands including Venus Diablo (formerly Smurfette's Whorehouse) and Kid Meets Cougar (drums).

In 2013, the band celebrated the release of their album The Trail of the Painted Pony when they performed at Las Vegas' Neon Reverb music festival with Coastwest Unrest, who also released a new album at the event. The band was working on a self-produced LP due out sometime in 2015.

== Albums ==
- The Trail of the Painted Pony (2013)
- Clementine (2009)
- Dia De Los Muertos (2007)
- Horse Feathers (2007)
- All By Yer Lonesome (2005)
