= 18b The Las Vegas Arts District =

Downtown district in Nevada, U.S.

Coordinates: 36.159°N 115.151°W

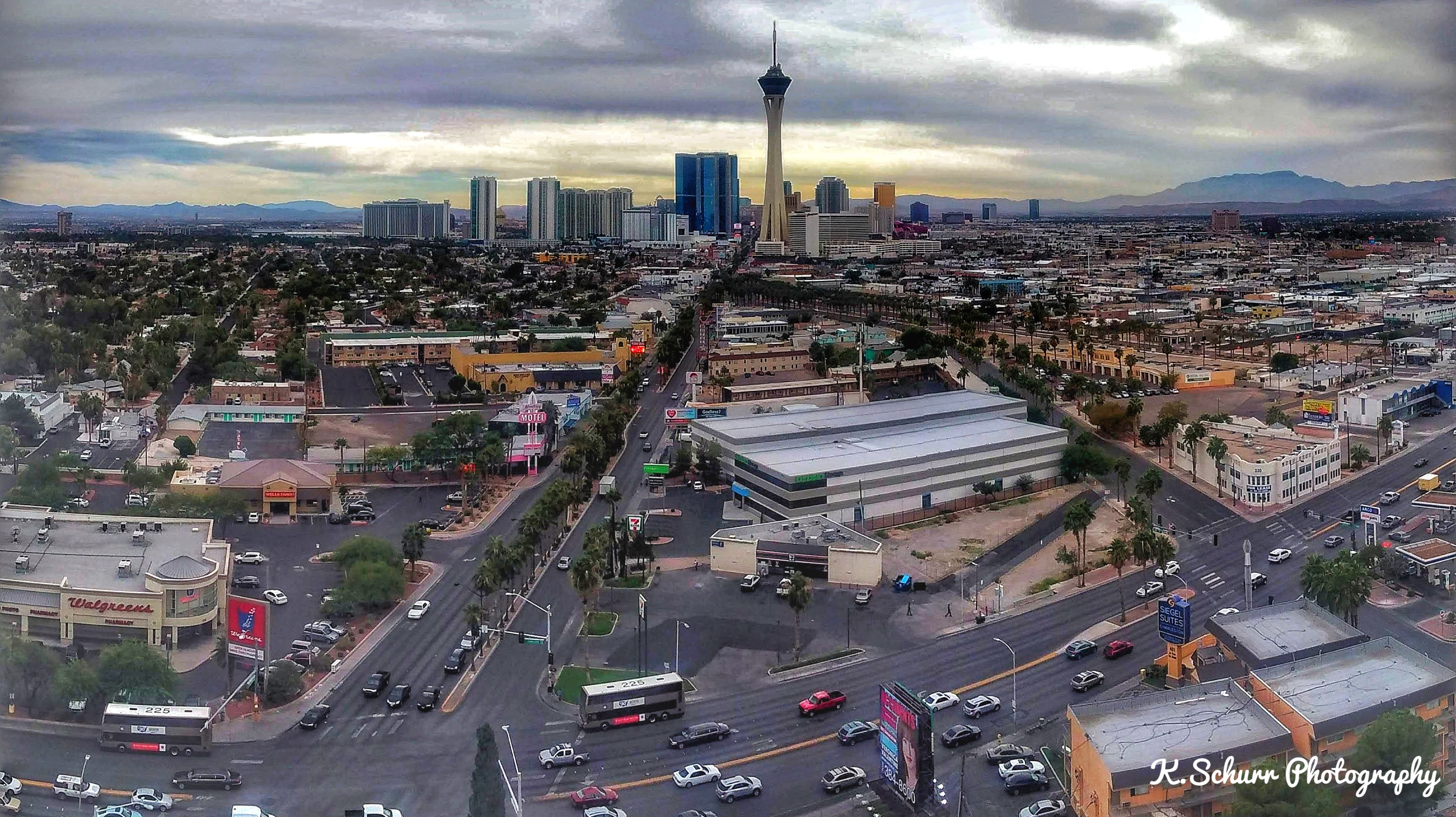
Looking south over the intersection of Charleston and Las Vegas Boulevard in 2015. A portion of the Arts District is seen along the right half.

18b The Las Vegas Arts District is located in downtown Las Vegas, Nevada. The district includes art galleries, clothing and antique stores, restaurants, bars, and breweries.

The Arts District is located north of the Las Vegas Strip. East Charleston Boulevard runs through the center of the district from west to east. According to the city, the district is officially bounded by Hoover Avenue to the north and Commerce Street to the west. The southern boundary runs just past Colorado Avenue, while the east border runs along 4th Street up until Charleston, continuing along South Las Vegas Boulevard the rest of the way to Hoover.

The idea of an arts district in Las Vegas dates to 1998, and slowly developed in the years to come. A First Friday event was launched in 2002, to promote the new district. The event proved to be a success, eventually helping to transform the area. The Arts District rose to prominence in the mid-2010s, with the opening of various businesses.

== History ==
The Arts District was conceived by Wes Myles (formerly Wes Isbutt), who opened the Arts Factory in 1997. Located at 107 East Charleston Boulevard, in what used to be an office supply warehouse, the Arts Factory housed several galleries. A year after opening, Myles partnered with the city to throw a street festival in the immediate area known as the Gateway Music & Arts Experience. Myles hoped that the festival would demonstrate the potential for an arts district in the downtown area. Mayor Oscar Goodman, elected in 1999, became a prominent supporter of the idea. A year later, the Las Vegas City Council was in discussions to make the district a reality.

S2 Art, an art publisher and retailer, opened next to the Arts Factory in 2001, but progress on an arts district was otherwise slow-moving. Las Vegas, up to that point, had not been known as an art-centric city. Other factors were high rent rates and a common belief that the downtown area was crime-ridden. Myles estimated that it would take four more art businesses for the district to flourish. With a $100,000 loan from the city council, S2 co-owner Jack Solomon moved his company's headquarters to the area to help spur additional development. Proponents hoped to transform the area into a SoHo-style neighborhood.

The name Gateway Arts District was in use as of 2001, and the area was renamed a year later as the Las Vegas Arts District. By the end of 2002, numerous shops and restaurants had opened in the area, and further development was in the planning stage. In 2005, the former Holsum bread factory was renovated into Holsum Lofts, housing numerous businesses.

In 2006, artists voiced opposition to new high-rise condominium projects in the area, including Newport Lofts, expressing concern that real-estate prices would rise as a result. Proponents such as Solomon argued that the projects would bring foot traffic to the Arts District, while the artists believed that most units would be used as vacation homes rather than full-time residences. Aside from the condo projects, progress remained sluggish in the Arts District. By 2008, businesses in the area had been featured in television commercials for several companies, including McDonald's.

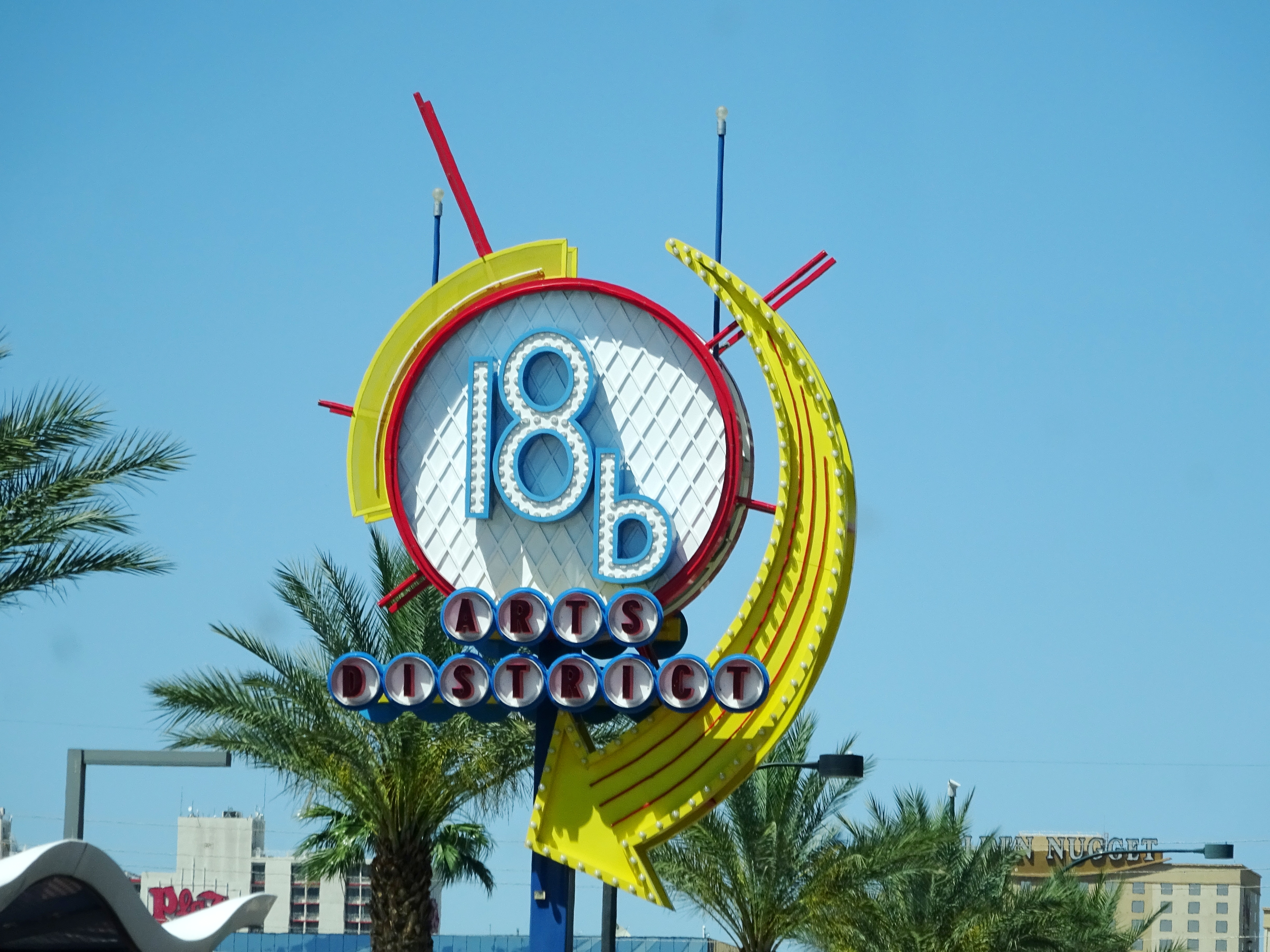
18b sign on Casino Center Boulevard

In 2009, a sign was installed on Casino Center Boulevard for the newly named 18b Arts District, a reference to the original number of city blocks in the area. Because of zoning changes, the district made up 21 blocks at the time of the sign's installation.

In 2010, RTC Transit established a bus route through the Arts District, a project accompanied by new trees and wider sidewalks. The route was expected to bring 6,000 riders through the district daily. It was intended to replace an older route served by RTC's Deuce buses. However, RTC restored the old route due to popular demand, while retaining the new route as well. Artists were upset by the change, as it reduced visitation to the district.

S2 Art moved out of the district in 2011, and Myles had become tired of battling with the city over codes and permits. He also felt the city was giving more attention to other downtown projects, including the World Market Center and the Smith Center for the Performing Arts. He announced in 2012 that he would sell the Arts Factory. After several failed attempts, the building was sold in 2015, and continues to operate.

The Arts District became more prominent during the mid-2010s, as new businesses moved into the area. Its popularity increased further after a beautification project concluded in 2018. Property values in the area also increased. As growth continued, the Arts District began to struggle with an inadequate number of parking spaces. Between 2020 and 2023, the district saw 30 new businesses. The city purchased several parcels in order to build a parking garage for the district, with completion expected by late 2025. The city also partnered with Artspace Projects, hoping to eventually develop affordable living and commercial spaces for artists in the district.

In 2024, CNN called the Arts District "the most exciting neighborhood" in Las Vegas. It was also noted that the area is largely unknown to tourists, who typically spend most of their time on the nearby Las Vegas Strip.

== Events ==
A First Friday event was launched in 2002, to showcase artists' work and to promote the district, the existence of which was not well known. The monthly event was conceived by Cindy Funkhouser, who owned the antique store Funk House. Funkhouser was inspired to start the event after visiting her son in Portland, where she learned of a local event known as First Thursday.

In 2003, the city provided a $5,000 grant for billboards promoting First Friday. By the end of 2005, the event was bringing 8,000 to 10,000 people to the Arts District monthly. First Friday soon grew to include musical performances, and eventually became too large for Funkhouser to handle. The event was scaled back as a result of this and of financial problems brought on by the Great Recession. Businessman Tony Hsieh and several investors purchased the rights to First Friday in 2011. First Friday is a free event and continues to be held monthly. It is credited with helping transform the area into an arts district.

Life Is Beautiful, an annual festival held in downtown Las Vegas, announced that a scaled-back side event would take place at the Arts District in September 2024.

== Features ==
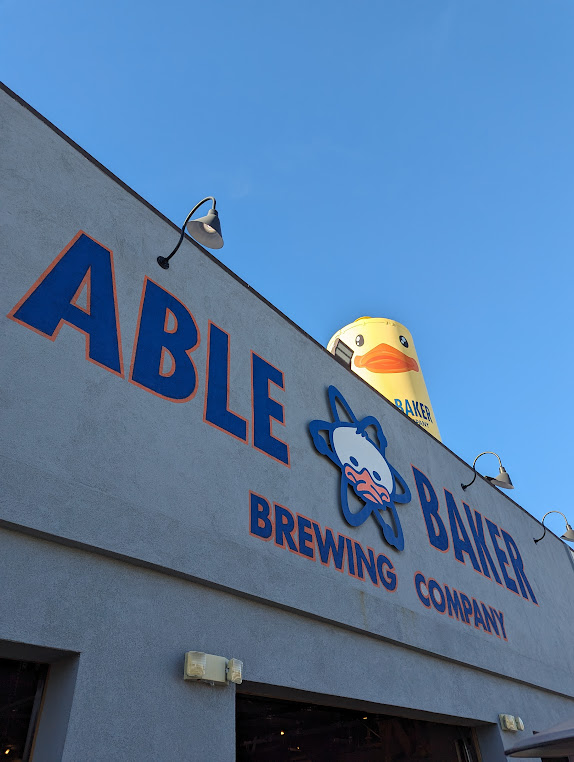
Able Baker Brewing Company

The Arts District is home to various galleries, clothing and antique stores, restaurants, bars, and breweries. Hop Nuts Brewing was the first to open in the Arts District, debuting in 2014. This was followed five years later by Able Baker Brewing Company, named in reference to the Able and Baker atomic tests.

Esther's Kitchen, a popular Italian restaurant by chef James Trees, opened in 2018. Six years later, it moved to a larger location within the district. Chef Wolfgang Puck is also a co-owner in 1228 Main, another restaurant which opened in 2023.

A 63-unit apartment building, known as shareDowntown, opened in 2020. The English Hotel opened two years later, in partnership with chef Todd English. The four-story hotel includes 74 rooms and the Pepper Club, a restaurant by English. A condo hotel addition is scheduled to open by late 2025. Other hotel and apartment projects are also planned, with some potentially opening in 2025.

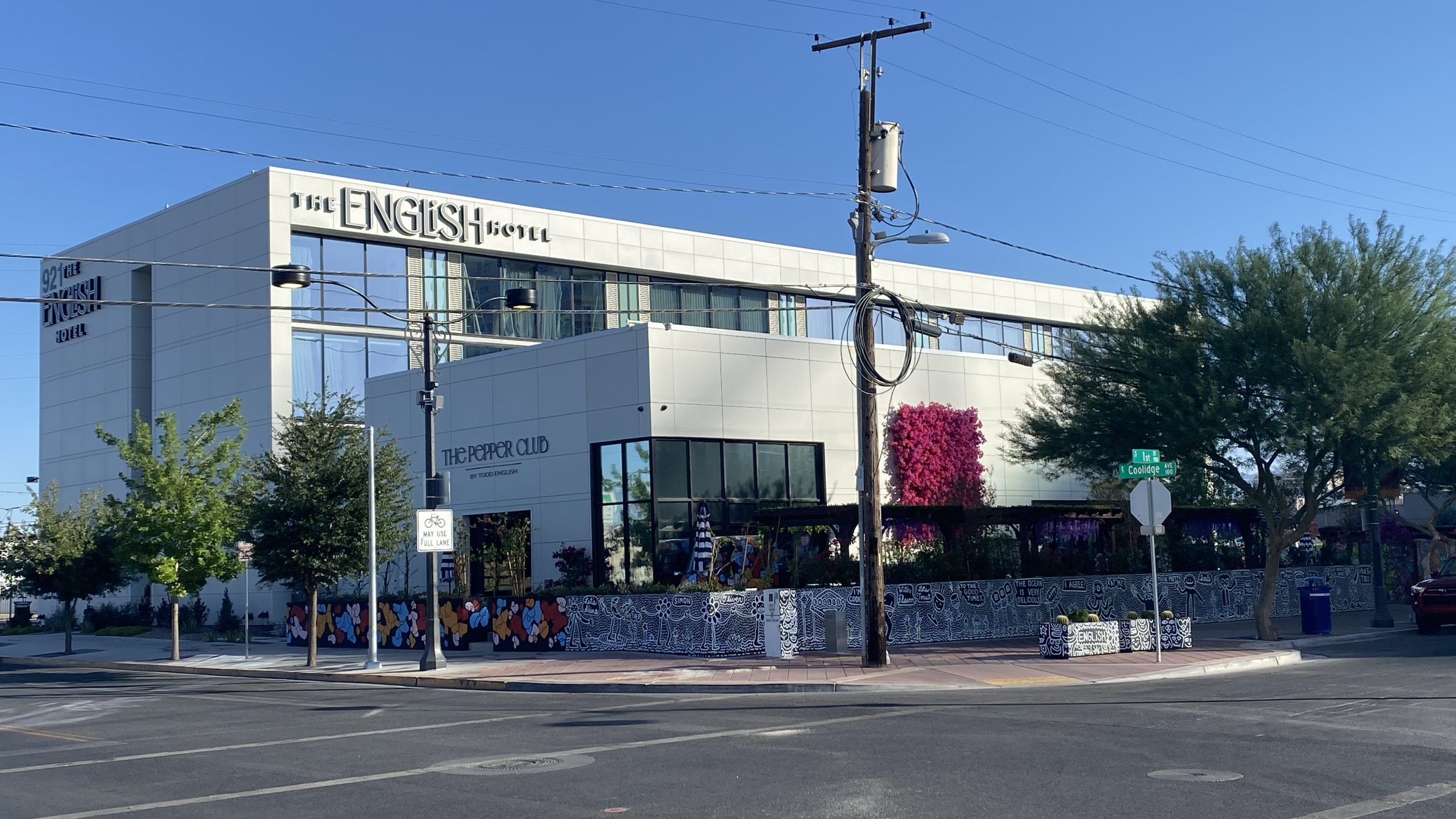
The English Hotel and Pepper Club

The Arts District has several performance theaters, including Majestic Repertory Theatre, opened in 2016. The Las Vegas Community Healing Garden was established shortly after the 2017 Las Vegas shooting, serving as a permanent memorial for victims.

The Arts District also includes a park known as Boulder Plaza, sometimes used for events. It is located on what used to be a portion of Boulder Avenue. It was originally planned as a sculpture park, intended as a signature attraction for the area. Artist Yaacov Agam was hired in 2004 to create dozens of 18-foot columns for the park. The columns would have inlays of colors and shapes that fluctuate as visitors walk past them. Agam's project was eventually canceled as a result of disagreement between local business owners, who were at odds with each other on what material to use for the columns. The park, however, had already been completed.

== Art ==
Art is featured throughout the district. In 2007, business owners wanted an art installation to mark the gateway to the area. Dennis Oppenheim was one of several artists who competed for the opportunity; none of their proposals were widely acclaimed, although Oppenheim's was considered the best: neon colors being poured from paint buckets, accompanied by flamingos. However, it was later determined that this project would cost too much at $3 million.

Oppenheim's eventual design consists of two slanted paintbrushes standing 45 feet. Colorful LED lights beam from the tops of the paintbrushes at night, referencing the city's history with neon signage. Some artists were disappointed with the design, criticizing its simplicity and questioning its relevance to the history of Las Vegas. Oppenheim's initial vision for this proposal consisted of four paintbrushes, but this too was scaled back because of budget constraints. The final project cost $700,000. The paintbrushes were installed in 2010, but one had to be realigned to get the angle correct. The LED lights had also yet to be programmed. Oppenheim died in 2011, and the project was finalized several months later. Both paintbrushes were installed along East Charleston Boulevard, one at the intersection of South Las Vegas Boulevard and the other located several blocks west. Originally, they were to be installed across from each other.

In 2018, another installation by local artist Luis Varela-Rico was added. Titled Radial Symmetry, it consists of two steel sculptures weighing 10 tons apiece. The project cost $246,000, and is located at Main and Commerce streets. In 2022, the Arts District added two neon signs in the form of 25-foot-tall showgirls, moved from an earlier location near the Strat observation tower.

The Arts District features numerous murals. One of them, designed to resemble a Las Vegas postcard, was painted in 2020. Known as Greetings from Las Vegas, it has since become a popular photo spot.
