= Music of Nevada =

The music in Nevada is often associated with the Rat Pack and lounge singers like Wayne Newton playing in Las Vegas, Reno, and Carson City. However, Nevada has launched many other notable artists and bands from a variety of genres.

== Alternative rock ==
The Killers formed in Las Vegas in 2001. They are seen as one of the biggest rock bands of the 21st century, and the most successful rock act to ever emerge from the state of Nevada, having sold an estimated 35 million albums worldwide. Their album Wonderful Wonderful topped the Billboard 200 in 2017, while their 2006 album Sam's Town peaked at No. 2. They have achieved worldwide success as a live band, performing in over fifty countries and on six continents, headlining venues such as Madison Square Garden and Wembley Stadium. The Killers' lead vocalist Brandon Flowers, born in Henderson, Nevada, has additionally released three solo albums (2010's Flamingo, 2015's The Desired Effect and 2026's Thrasher), the former two of which charted in the top 20 of the Billboard 200, as well as topped the UK Albums Chart.

Imagine Dragons is a Grammy Award-winning band based in Las Vegas. They have enjoyed immense international success and acclaim. Imagine Dragons is the only artist or group with two songs in the Top Ten Most Downloaded Songs in Rock History "Radioactive" (No. 1) and "Demons" (No. 8). They have had a No. 1 album with the alternative Smoke + Mirrors in 2015, and two No. 2 albums on the Billboard 200. Lead singer Dan Reynolds attended the University of Nevada, Las Vegas.

Big Talk is a rock band from Las Vegas formed by Ronnie Vannucci Jr, best known as the drummer of the Killers. The band released a self-titled album in 2011 and a second album titled Straight In No Kissin' in 2015. Big Talk made their live television debut on Jimmy Kimmel Live! on July 25, 2011.

Panic! at the Disco was a rock band from Las Vegas, Nevada formed in 2004 which featured vocalist and multi-instrumentalist Brendon Urie. They have had two No. 1 albums on the Billboard 200 with the pop rock Death of a Bachelor in 2016, and Pray for the Wicked in 2018.

The Cab is a pop rock band from Las Vegas, Nevada. They've been called "The Band You Need to Know 2008" by Alternative Press and were featured in the "100 Bands You Need to Know in 2010" by the magazine.

Bassist Branden Campbell of Neon Trees grew up in Las Vegas.

== Alt country ==
Several alt country bands including The Clydesdale and The Yeller Bellies, both of whom have released multiple albums each, are a part of the Las Vegas music scene.

== Blues ==
NBC's America's Got Talent winner Michael Grimm is a Las Vegas resident who regularly performs in the valley.

== Country ==
The city of Elko, Nevada is an important center for cowboy music and poetry. In 1985, Hal Cannon, director of the Western Folklife Center, founded the first Cowboy Poetry Gathering, which has since spread across the country; Elko is also home to the Cowboy Music Gathering. Las Vegas' music scene includes a number of country and cowboy-themed hotel shows, many of them featuring big stars like Reba McEntire, Willie Nelson and Dolly Parton.

== Dance ==
Dino graduated of University of Nevada, Las Vegas before releasing two top ten hits on the Billboard Hot 100.

Multiple members of the Grammy-nominated group The Jets relocated to Las Vegas, Nevada where they still perform.

== Folk ==
David Hopkins, a singer-songwriter from Ireland, relocated to Las Vegas where he released a 2010 album featuring Damien Rice and Laura Jansen. His recordings have landed on the Irish singles top 40 chart and Las Vegas Weekly dubbed him "an Ace singer-songwriter".

Jenny Lewis (of Rilo Kiley) grew up in Las Vegas and featured on the debut solo album of Brandon Flowers.

Jill & Julia are a local folk duo signed to Nashville indie label, Lamon Records.

== Garage rock ==
Several garage acts have gained notoriety in Las Vegas. The Mad Caps mix blues and rockabilly with garage rock, while Rob Bell (of The Yeller Bellies) mixes country with garage rock in his project known as The Psyatics

== Gospel ==
Rock and Roll Hall of Fame inductee Gladys Knight lives in Las Vegas and leads the Saints Unified Voices gospel music choir. Together with the choir, Knight earned a Grammy Award for Best Gospel Choir or Chorus Album.

== Hard rock ==
Post-hardcore group Escape the Fate have charted on the Billboard 200 three times. Two singles have charted on the Hot Rock Songs chart.

Post-hardcore group Falling in Reverse have charted on the Billboard 200 three times.

Adelitas Way have twice charted on the Billboard 200. Four singles have charted on the Hot Rock Songs chart.

Otherwise have charted on the Billboard 200 twice, and blend hard rock and alternative rock. They charted on the Hot Rock Songs chart with "Soldiers".

Slaughter have charted on the Billboard 200 three times, but more recent albums courtesy of an independent label have failed to chart.

Heavy metal group Hemlock have never charted on the Billboard 200.

In 2011, Five Finger Death Punch relocated to Las Vegas. They have had three No. 2 albums on the Billboard 200, most recently in 2015.

== Indie ==
As a result of the downtown Las Vegas restoration that began in 2006, mainly that of the Fremont East district, which spurred the opening of several new bars and clubs, a new music scene began sprouting up in Las Vegas. With the support of local press, independent musical artists such as the bands Black Camaro, The Big Friendly Corporation, Halloween Town, and A Crowd of Small Adventures grew large fan bases quickly in Las Vegas.

The Las Vegas indie music community would soon form its own music festival to parallel that of the SXSW festival in Austin, Texas. Founded by Thirry Harlin, James Woodbridge, and Jason Aragon, the music festival, known as Neon Reverb, which consisted of both national and local indie acts, experimented with genres such as Hip-Hop and punk rock as well as other culture related segments such as film and visual art that complement the music portion of the festival. The festival has grown to include a radio segment of the same name, founded by Donald Hickey and the Killers bassist, Mark Stoermer that broadcasts from 91.5 KUNV in Las Vegas.

As a result of the continuing revitalization of downtown Las Vegas, a second wave of indie acts have grown prominent in the local music scene. In December 2011, songwriter Zach Ryan premiered his new band Zach Ryan and the Rouge, which has since been renamed Zach Ryan and the Renegades. Other second wave Las Vegas Indie acts include Restless Suns, and Alaska, who both arrived in 2012. In October 2012, Las Vegas based band Bear With Me finished tracking an EP at Chrome Werewolf, a Las Vegas studio opened in 2011 by Black Camaro's Brian Garth. The EP marks Bear With Me's second release and features the song I Am a Fiesta.

== Pop ==
Amadour, has worked in pop music alongside their visual art practice, releasing the EP Western Movie Dream (2023) and developing the orchestral pop project The Myth of Amadour: Odyssey of a High Desert Balladeer.

Leah Dizon released an album that reached the top ten albums in Japan in 2007 and included two top ten singles on the Oricon Singles Chart.

== Psychedelic ==
In December 2012 Trevor and The Joneses self-released There Was Lightning, their first LP. The band formed in early 2012, has performed over 150 shows, and has shared the stage with acts such as The Warlocks. The band was the last to record in Brian Garth's now defunct studio Chrome Werewolf in downtown Las Vegas.

== Punk rock ==
Las Vegas is home to notable punk and hardcore bands such as Caravels and Stolas.

=== Punks in Vegas ===
Punksinvegas.com is a website founded by Emily Matview in 2011. The website publishes news, concert photographs and album reviews relating to punk rock, hardcore punk, ska, emo and indie rock with a specific emphasis on bands from or playing in the Las Vegas and Henderson area. The website began as a simple database of punk shows coming to the Las Vegas area and quickly expanded to include original content, most notably a series of acoustic videos called The Stripped Down Sessions. The Stripped Down Session have featured such notable acts as Less Than Jake, The Bouncing Souls and Dead to Me playing acoustic versions of their songs, often debuting songs for the first time through the Sessions. In late 2011 the website released their first music compilation, featuring new, acoustic holiday-themed songs from Forever Came Calling, Last Call and The Sheds. More recently, Punksinvegas.com has begun re-releasing out of print punk and hardcore albums digitally under the Vegas Archive banner.

== Rap ==
Dizzy Wright's second album reached No. 47 on the Billboard 200.

== R&B ==
Ne-Yo is the only solo act from Las Vegas to have topped the Billboard 200, which he did twice, including with In My Own Words in 2006. He has released five studio albums that topped the R&B Albums Chart and three singles that topped the R&B Singles Chart.

702 is an American girl group from Las Vegas, named after the area code for Las Vegas. They released a platinum selling album by the same name and had two top ten hits on the Billboard Hot 100.

Gladys Knight of Gladys Knight & the Pips also resides in Las Vegas. She and the Pips have released six studio albums that topped the R&B Albums Chart and eleven singles that topped the R&B Singles Chart.

== Producers in and from Nevada ==
- Ron Aniello (Lifehouse, Jars of Clay, Bruce Springsteen) – Grammy Award nominee
- Steve Aoki - Grammy Award nominee
- Kevin Churko (Five Finger Death Punch, Hinder, Ozzy Osbourne) – Grammy Award nominee
- Chris Cox (Cher, Hannah Montana) – Grammy Award nominee
- Mark Stoermer (Howling Bells, The Killers) – Grammy Award nominee
- Bjorn Thorsrud (Smashing Pumpkins, Billy Corgan, The Dandy Warhols)

== Major label artists (signed from Nevada) ==
=== Groups ===
- Adelitas Way (Virgin Records)
- Branden Campbell (of Neon Trees) (Mercury Records)
- Big Talk (Epitaph Records)
- The Cab (Universal Republic Records)
- The Crystal Method (V2 Records) – Grammy Award nominee, had an album called Vegas in 1997
- Five Finger Death Punch (Prospect Park Records)
- Escape the Fate (Interscope Records)
- Falling in Reverse (Epitaph Records)
- The Higher (Epitaph, Sony Records)
- Imagine Dragons (Interscope Records) – Grammy Award winner, Dan Reynolds inducted into Songwriter Hall of Fame
- The Killers (Island Records) – Grammy Award nominee
- Otherwise (Century Media Records)
- Panic! at the Disco (Fueled by Ramen) – Grammy Award nominee
- Slaughter (Chrysalis Records)

=== Solo acts ===
- Toni Basil (Chrysalis Records) – Grammy Award nominee
- Brandon Flowers (Island Records)
- Michael Grimm (Epic Records)
- Jenny Lewis (Warner Bros Records)
- Ne-Yo (Universal Motown Records) – Grammy Award winner.
- Eric Whitacre (Decca Records) – Grammy Award winner
- Dizzy Wright (Warner Bros. Records)

== Nevada music venues ==
=== Pioneer Center for the Performing Arts ===
The Pioneer Center for the Performing Arts is one of Nevada's most significant cultural venues, known for its distinctive gold-anodized geodesic dome designed by Buckminster Fuller's collaborators. Since opening in 1967, it has hosted major performances and remains a landmark of Reno's performing arts scene. It is the home of the Reno Philharmonic Orchestra.

=== The Smith Center for the Performing Arts ===
In 2012, Smith Center for the Performing Arts, a $470 million facility opened. The center is free of slots and gambling. Instead, it features fine arts productions including symphonies, Broadway performances, and international talents. It is also the home of the Las Vegas Philharmonic Orchestra and Nevada Ballet Theatre.

=== Other venues ===
- Artemus Ham Hall at University of Nevada, Las Vegas
- Brooklyn Bowl
- The Colosseum at Caesars Palace
- Downtown Las Vegas Events Center
- The Joint
- The Huntridge (Performing Arts Center)
- Grand Theater
- Knitting Factory
- Lawlor Events Center at University of Nevada, Reno
- Mandalay Bay Events Center
- MGM Grand Garden Arena
- Pearl Concert Theater
- Thomas & Mack Center
- T-Mobile Arena
- Zappos Theater at Planet Hollywood Las Vegas

=== Music festivals ===
- Life Is Beautiful (2013–present)
- Las Vegas Bluegrass Festival (2013–present)
- Neon Reverb Music Festival
- Punk Rock Bowling Festival

== Recording studios ==
- Battle Born Studios (owned and operated by The Killers)
- Studio at the Palms
- WM Studios
