= Las Vegas CityLife =

- Type: Alternative weekly
- Owner: Stephens Media
- Editor: Scott Dickensheets
- Founded: 1996
- Ceased publication: 2014
- Headquarters: 1111 W. Bonanza Road, Las Vegas, NV, 89106
- Circulation: 70,000
- Website: www.lasvegascitylife.com

Las Vegas CityLife was an American alternative weekly newspaper founded in August 1996. It was the oldest such newspaper in Southern Nevada and covered news about the Las Vegas Valley and surrounding areas. Coverage included news, politics, arts, and culture reporting in print and online formats. It folded in 2014.

== History ==
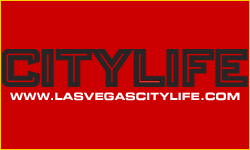
An older version of the CityLife banner.

The precursor to CityLife was a publication called the Las Vegas New Times. Started in September 1992, Las Vegas New Times was quickly sold to Wick Communications, also known as Las Vegas Press, which published three newspapers in the Las Vegas area - the Las Vegas Business Press, Las Vegas CityLife and the Las Vegas Senior Press. On August 1, 1996, the Las Vegas New Times' name was changed to Las Vegas CityLife to avoid legal conflicts with another publication, the Phoenix New Times. Rod Smith published CityLife from August 1998 to January 2002.

Over the course of the newspaper's history, two large Las Vegas casino corporations, the MGM and Station Casinos, pulled their advertising because of news stories about their properties and managers which the businesses felt were condemnatory. Rod Smith, the publisher at the time, called the actions of the MGM, in particular, "petty private censorship."

In March 2004, Portland-based designer Kat Topaz redesigned the CityLife logo and layout to give the publication an updated feel. The current design is the work of Maureen Adamo.

The offices of CityLife were housed alongside the Las Vegas Review-Journal building, at 1111 W. Bonanza Road, Las Vegas, NV, 89106. Formerly, the paper was located on Pama Lane in Green Valley, Henderson, and before that, on Wynn Road near Chinatown, Las Vegas. The publication was owned by Stephens Media Group but was initially owned by Wick Communications. Its primary competitors were Scope Magazine (first published in April 1992), Las Vegas Weekly (which emerged in 1998 after a majority interest in Scope Magazine was sold to Daniel Greenspun in 1996) and Vegas Seven (founded in 2010).

Its editor, Scott Dickensheets, took the position in February 2011 after then-Editor Steve Sebelius returned to the Las Vegas Review-Journal as a political columnist. Former managing editors include Larry Lane, Bill Hughes, Geoff Schumacher, Hugh Jackson, Matthew O'Brien and Steve Sebelius. Former writers include Sarah Jane Woodall, Chad Plummer, Launce Rake, Pj Perez, Heidi Walters, Amy Kingsley, Chip Mosher, George Knapp, Saab Lofton, Mike Prevatt, Cathy Scott, Quentin Bufogle, and columnist James P. Reza, previously the editor of Scope Magazine. Syndicated columns included Savage Love and Free Will Astrology by Rob Brezsny.

In September 2006, CityLife earned more awards than the other weekly newspapers in the state in the Nevada Press Association's annual Better Newspapers Contest, which competed against 40 weekly NPA member publications.

In 2009, CityLife was accepted for membership in the Association of Alternative Newsweeklies, an organization of alternative weekly newspapers in the United States and Canada. The newspaper had applied unsuccessfully for membership in 2007. In 2010, the newspaper won a first-place award from AAN in the "format buster" category for a report on disparate redevelopment spending between downtown Las Vegas and the heavily minority West Las Vegas area. Staffers recognized for the award were Amy Kingsley, Maureen Adamo and videographer Justin Yurkanin.

On January 30, 2014, the paper ceased production, and shut down its website a year later.

== Recurring features ==
Recurring features in CityLife included:

- "Fear No Evil," Saab Lofton's far leftist news column
- "CityLife Picks," top event listings for the week
- "Best of the Valley," yearly listing of readers' choices for favorite restaurants and other venues in various categories
- "On The Scene," short feature about a clubbing or event pick for the week
- "Fear and Lounging," weekly music performance pick
- "Dining Out," weekly restaurant pick
- "Socrates in Sodom," opinion piece by Clark County educator Chip Mosher
- "Crime & Punishment," column by journalist and author Cathy Scott
- "Smart Guy," weekly column by James P. Reza

== Publication distribution ==
Las Vegas CityLife was free to the public and went to press every Wednesday for publication and distribution citywide on Thursdays. As of September 2011, circulation was 70,000 copies per week at more than 2,200 sites, including University of Nevada, Las Vegas, Barnes & Noble, Terrible Herbst, and 7-Eleven.
