= 2007 in American music =

The following is a list of events and releases that have happened in 2007 in music in the United States.

== Notable events ==
=== January ===
- 23 – John Mellencamp released his first studio album in four years, Freedom's Road.
  - The Shins released their first studio album in almost four years, Wincing the Night Away.

=== February ===
- 4 – Billy Joel performed the National Anthem and Prince performed the halftime show during Super Bowl XLI at Dolphins Stadium in Miami Gardens, Florida.
- 11 – The 49th Annual Grammy Awards took place at the Staples Center in Los Angeles. The Dixie Chicks won the most awards with five including Album of the Year for Taking the Long Way, and Record of the Year and Song of the Year for "Not Ready to Make Nice". This comes four years after the backlash they faced after criticizing former President George W. Bush.
- 13 – Lucinda Williams released her first studio album in four years, West.
- 15 – Chris Cornell announces his departure from Audioslave, and states that the band has disbanded. The band briefly reunited in 2017, a few months before Cornell's death in May 2017.
- 26 – From First to Last frontman Sonny Moore left the band to begin his solo career as an EDM and electronic music DJ under the name Skrillex.

=== March ===
- 9 – Boston lead singer and founding member Brad Delp died by suicide at his home in New Hampshire. He was 55.
- 13 – Musiq Soulchild released his first studio album in almost four years, Luvanmusiq.

=== April ===
- 3 – Timbaland released his first solo studio album in nine years, Shock Value.
- 24 – The first Idol Gives Back charity special happens during the Top 6 week of the sixth season of American Idol. There were performances by Kelly Clarkson with Jeff Beck, Carrie Underwood, Celine Dion, Earth, Wind & Fire, Annie Lennox, Il Divo, Rascal Flatts, Fergie, Josh Groban, Green Day, Jack Black, and the Top 6 contestants. In total $76 million was raised.
- 26 – The Latin Billboard Music Awards took place at the BankUnited Center in Coral Gables, Florida.

=== May ===
- 12 – Maroon 5 breaks the record for a song's biggest jump to number one on the Billboard Hot 100 with "Makes Me Wonder", which jumped from 64–1. They held the record until September 2008, when it was broken by T.I..
- 15 – The 42nd Academy of Country Music Awards took place at the MGM Grand Garden Arena in Las Vegas. Carrie Underwood won the most awards with three. Kenny Chesney was named Entertainer of the Year.
  - Tank released his first studio album in almost five years, Sex, Love & Pain.
- 17 – Will Hunt and Troy McLawhorn, formerly of Dark New Day, join Evanescence as drummer and guitarist, replacing Rocky Gray and John LeCompt, respectively.
- 23 – Jordin Sparks won the sixth season of American Idol. Blake Lewis was named runner-up.

=== June ===
- 5 – Marilyn Manson released their first studio album in four years, Eat Me, Drink Me.
- 14 – Kelly Clarkson cancelled her tour due to low ticket sales. This comes on the heels of her public feud with the head of Sony BMG, Clive Davis who was dissatisfied with her third studio album My December. A smaller second incarnation of the tour began in September 2007.
- 15 – The White Stripes released their sixth and final studio album, Icky Thump.
- 24 – American rapper T.I is involved in a physical altercation with Chaka Zulu, the manager of Ludacris, at the Sunset Tower Hotel in West Hollywood, California.

=== July ===
- 7 – Giants Stadium in East Rutherford, New Jersey and the National Mall in Washington, D.C. were two of the many locations to host the Live Earth benefit concert. Some of the American artists who performed were; Garth Brooks, Metallica, Kelly Clarkson, John Legend, John Mayer, Melissa Ethridge, Fall Out Boy, Red Hot Chili Peppers, Alicia Keys, and others.
- 9 – Buffalo Tom released their first studio album in nine years, Three Easy Pieces.
- 10 – The Smashing Pumpkins released their first studio album in almost seven years, Zeitgeist.

=== August ===
- 7 – Buck-O-Nine released their first studio album in six years, Sustain.
- 14 – Blaqk Audio, the electronic side project of AFI members Davey Havok and Jade Puget, released their debut album, CexCells.
- 28 – Ledisi released her first studio album in five years, Lost & Found.

=== September ===
- 7 – The MTV Video Music Awards took place at The Palms in Paradise, Nevada. Justin Timberlake won the most awards with four. Rihanna and Jay-Z won Video of the Year for "Umbrella".
- 18 – Pearl Jam frontman Eddie Vedder released his debut solo album, Into the Wild.
  - Thurston Moore of Sonic Youth released his first solo album in twelve years, Trees Outside the Academy.
- 21 – Kanye West's third studio album Graduation set the record for the longest week of an album digitally downloaded with over 130,000 paid downloads registered.
- 25 – Bruce Springsteen released Magic, his first studio album with the E Street Band in five years.

=== October ===
- 22 – System of a Down frontman Serj Tankian released his debut solo album, Elect the Dead.
- 30 – The Backstreet Boys released Unbreakable, their first studio album without Kevin Richardson, who left the group in 2006. This is also their first album without the involvement of longtime producer Max Martin.
  - The Eagles released their first studio album in 28 years, Long Road Out of Eden.
  - Tool and A Perfect Circle frontman Maynard James Keenan's side project, Puscifer, released its debut album, "V" Is for Vagina.
  - Britney Spears released her first studio album in four years, Blackout. It was supposed to be released two weeks later on November 13, but its release was rushed after it was leaked online.

=== November ===
- 7 – The Country Music Association Awards took place at the Sommet Center in Nashville, Tennessee.
- 9 – Alicia Keys released her first studio album in four years, As I Am.
- 18 – American Music Awards took place at the Nokia Theater in Los Angeles. Both Daughtry and Carrie Underwood won the most awards with three each with Underwood winning Artist of the Year.
- 24 – Hawthorne Heights guitarist and unclean vocalist Casey Calvert was found dead on the band's tour bus in Washington, D.C. at the age of 26.
- 25 – Kevin DuBrow, lead singer of Quiet Riot, was found dead in his home in Las Vegas, his death having occurred six days earlier. He was 52.

=== December ===
- 11 – Wu-Tang Clan released their first studio album in six years, 8 Diagrams. This their first album with new member Cappadonna.
- 12 – Singer Ike Turner died at his home in San Marcos, California at the age of 76.

== Bands formed ==
- 2AM Club
- 8 Legged Monster
- 1476
- Aaron & Amanda Crabb
- Above the Golden State
- The Abyss
- Acid Witch
- The Active Set
- After Hours
- Against All Will
- Alphabet Rockers
- AM Taxi
- American Babies
- Among the Thirsty
- Andy Frasco & The U.N.
- Angelical Tears
- Animals as Leaders
- Anthem Lights
- Apache Beat
- Arms Aloft
- Artist vs. Poet
- As Yet Unbroken
- Asia featuring John Payne
- The Atlas Moth
- Attack Attack!
- The Audibles
- Austins Bridge
- Balance and Composure
- Breathe Carolina
- Cimorelli
- Company of Thieves
- Dirty Little Rabbits
- Fit for a King
- Foxboro Hot Tubs
- Garfunkel and Oates
- Girls
- Go Radio
- Haim
- Holy Ghost!
- Hurray for the Riff Raff
- Krewella
- The Maine
- Monster in the Machine
- Myka Relocate
- The Narrative
- Never Shout Never
- Owl City
- The Pains of Being Pure at Heart
- Paper Tongues
- Passion Pit
- Phantogram
- Plushgun
- The Revivalists
- Saul
- School of Seven Bells
- Sixx:A.M.
- The Soft Pack
- The Story So Far
- The Summer Set
- Touché Amoré
- We Are the In Crowd

== Bands reformed ==
- Eve 6
- Simon & Garfunkel
- Sixpence None the Richer

== Bands on hiatus ==
- Abigail Williams
- Burden Brothers
- Deadsy
- The Early November
- Quiet Riot

== Bands disbanded ==
- 3LW
- The Actual
- Adair
- Adelphi
- Allister
- Army of Anyone
- Asesino
- Audio Adrenaline
- Audioslave
- Avenue D
- Bacilos
- The Blood Brothers
- Blood Circus
- Blue County
- Bluegrass Student Union
- Boys Choir of Harlem
- Burden Brothers
- Calico System
- Cornbugs
- Council of the Fallen
- The Crabb Family
- Cries Hannah
- Cycle Sluts from Hell
- Dead Poetic
- Deathray
- Dispatch
- The Divorce
- Dog Fashion Disco
- Dolour
- DramaGods
- Eighteen Visions
- Epoxies
- The Exit
- The Explosion
- Fabulous Disaster
- Funeral Diner
- Good Riddance
- Groovie Ghoulies
- The Heathens
- The Hidden Hand
- Hidden in Plain View
- Hot Cross
- Hot Rod Circuit
- I Would Set Myself on Fire for You
- Inked in Blood
- Jane
- Junior M.A.F.I.A.
- The Junior Varsity
- Jurassic 5
- Last Tuesday
- Latterman
- Le Tigre
- Lokomotiv
- Los Abandoned
- Matchbook Romance
- Much the Same
- N17
- The New Cars
- Nickel Creek
- Nodes of Ranvier
- Odd Project
- OutKast
- Park
- Pirates of the Mississippi
- Pretty Girls Make Graves
- Recon
- Scars of Tomorrow
- Sister Machine Gun
- Slim & the Supreme Angels
- Slingshot 57
- Slumber Party Girls
- Socialburn
- Some Girls
- Spitalfield
- The String Cheese Incident
- Sullivan
- Sultans
- Tait
- Time of Orchids
- Unpersons
- UGK
- U.S. Maple
- UTP
- Van Zant
- Vaux
- Victory at Sea
- Waking Ashland
- Wet Confetti
- With Passion
- The Wreckers

== List of albums released ==
=== January ===
Date	Album	Artist	Genre(s)
2	The Hit List	Unwritten Law	Alternative rock; pop-punk; punk rock
22	For Those Who Have Heart	A Day to Remember	Metalcore
23	The Bird and the Bee	The Bird and the Bee	Indie pop; indie rock
23	Freedom's Road	John Mellencamp	Rock; country rock
23	Late Night Special	Pretty Ricky	R&B; hip-hop
23	Blood Stained Love Story	Saliva	Nu metal; rap rock; rock; post-grunge
23	Wincing the Night Away	The Shins	Indie rock; indie pop; post-punk revival
30	At the Movies	Dave Koz	Smooth jazz
30	For the Love	Tracy Lawrence	Country
30	Katharine McPhee	Katharine McPhee	Pop

=== February ===
Date	Album	Artist	Genre(s)
6	The Walking Wounded	Bayside	Alternative rock; emo; pop-punk
6	Infinity on High	Fall Out Boy	Pop-punk; pop rock; emo; alternative rock
6	Awake	Secondhand Serenade	Acoustic rock; emo
13	In My Songs	Gerald Levert	R&B; soul
13	West	Lucinda Williams	Rock; folk; country
20	Cities	Anberlin	Alternative rock; emo; pop-punk
20	Welcome the Night	The Ataris	Alternative rock; indie rock

=== March ===
Date	Album	Artist	Genre(s)
6	Four Winds (EP)	Bright Eyes	Indie rock
6	On Fire	The Higher	Pop-punk; emo; pop rock
6	Five Score and Seven Years Ago	Relient K	Christian rock; pop-punk; power pop
6	Alpha	Sevendust	Alternative metal; rock; hard rock
12	Walk a Mile in My Shoes	Otis Clay	Blues
13	Secrets of the Lost Satellite	Ken Andrews	Alternative rock; electronic rock
13	Because I'm Awesome	The Dollyrots	Punk rock; pop-punk
13	Street Love	Lloyd	R&B
13	Luvanmusiq	Musiq Soulchild	R&B; neo soul
13	Rich Boy	Rich Boy	Southern hip-hop; gangsta rap
13	A Different Light	Sherwood	Alternative rock; pop rock; pop-punk
20	Pressure the Hinges	Haste the Day	Metalcore; Christian metal
20	Beautiful Tragedy	In This Moment	Metalcore; hard rock; post-hardcore
20	Sound of Silver	LCD Soundsystem	Dance-punk; electronic rock; electronica; indie rock; dance-rock
20	We Were Dead Before the Ship Even Sank	Modest Mouse	Alternative rock; indie pop; indie rock
20	Elliott Yamin	Elliott Yamin	Pop; R&B
21	Dignity	Hilary Duff	Electropop; Synthrock
26	From Them, Through Us, to You	Madina Lake	Alternative rock; emo; post-hardcore
27	Good Morning Revival	Good Charlotte	Alternative rock; dance-punk; pop-punk
27	The Blackening	Machine Head	Thrash metal; groove metal; progressive metal
27	Let It Go	Tim McGraw	Country
27	Music Is My Savior	Mims	Hip-hop

=== April ===
Date	Album	Artist	Genre(s)
2	Santi	The Academy Is...	Alternative rock; emo; pop-punk
2	Because of the Times	Kings of Leon	Alternative rock; rock
3	Southern Weather	The Almost	Alternative rock; emo; pop-punk
3	Vena Sera	Chevelle	Alternative metal; hard rock; rock; alternative rock
3	Traffic and Weather	Fountains of Wayne	Power pop; pop-punk; pop rock
3	Waking Up Laughing	Martina McBride	Country
3	Versions	Poison the Well	Metalcore; post-hardcore
3	Threads of Life	Shadows Fall	Metalcore; thrash metal; death metal
3	Cannibal	Static-X	Industrial metal; nu metal; hard rock
3	Shock Value	Timbaland	Hip-hop; R&B; pop
6	Hail Mega Boys	J. Roddy Walston and the Business	Southern rock; roots rock
10	Cassadaga	Bright Eyes	Indie rock; indie folk; indie pop
10	Holding a Wolf by the Ears	From Autumn to Ashes	Post-hardcore; emo; screamo; metalcore; Christian metal
10	Anhedonia	The Graduate	Indie rock
17	Travelin' On	Scott Blasey	Rock; folk rock
17	Bucky Covington	Bucky Covington	Country
17	Year Zero	Nine Inch Nails	Industrial rock; alternative rock; electronic rock
17	This Is Ryan Shaw	Ryan Shaw	R&B
24	One More Bullet	The Toasters	Ska
27	Baby 81	Black Rebel Motorcycle Club	Alternative rock; garage rock; punk rock

=== May ===
Date	Album	Artist	Genre(s)
1	Manipulator	The Fall of Troy	Post-hardcore; progressive rock
1	Crazy Ex-Girlfriend	Miranda Lambert	Country
1	Based on a True Story	Kimberly Locke	Pop; R&B
1	Because of You	Ne-Yo	R&B; hip-hop soul; pop
8	Princess P	Paris Bennett	R&B; pop
8	Strength & Loyalty	Bone Thugs-n-Harmony	Hip-hop; gangsta rap; R&B
15	Emotionalism	The Avett Brothers	Folk rock
15	Before Their Eyes	Before Their Eyes	Post-hardcore; emo
15	Downtown Battle Mountain	Dance Gavin Dance	Post-hardcore; experimental rock; progressive rock
15	The Moment	Framing Hanley	Alternative rock; post-hardcore; emo
15	Minutes to Midnight	Linkin Park	Alternative rock; alternative metal; hard rock
15	Sex, Love & Pain	Tank	R&B
15	The Else	They Might Be Giants	Alternative rock
15	Sky Blue Sky	Wilco	Alternative country; folk rock; indie rock
15	One of the Boys	Gretchen Wilson	Country
16	It Won't Be Soon Before Long	Maroon 5	Pop; pop rock
21	A Poet's Life	Tim Armstrong	Ska; alternative rock; indie rock
22	Truth in Sincerity	Amber Pacific	Pop-punk; emo
22	The Sun and the Moon	The Bravery	Alternative rock; indie rock
22	Lies for the Liars	The Used	Alternative rock; emo; post-hardcore
29	Relentless	Jason Aldean	Country
29	On Letting Go	Circa Survive	Progressive rock; emo; post-hardcore
29	Sink or Swim	The Gaslight Anthem	Punk rock
29	Double Up	R. Kelly	R&B; hip-hop
29	Ultra Payloaded	Satellite Party	Alternative rock

=== June ===
Date	Album	Artist	Genre(s)
5	Between Raising Hell and Amazing Grace	Big & Rich	Country
5	Cruel Melody	Black Light Burns	Industrial rock; alternative metal
5	Eat Me, Drink Me	Marilyn Manson	Industrial rock; hard rock; alternative rock
5	The Last of the International Playboys	Stroke 9	Alternative rock
5	Epiphany	T-Pain	R&B; hip-hop
5	Ciao, Baby	theSTART	Alternative rock; indie pop; synth-pop
12	From Nothin' to Somethin'	Fabolous	Hip-hop
12	Big Dog Daddy	Toby Keith	Country
12	Riot!	Paramore	Alternative rock; pop rock; pop-punk
12	Era Vulgaris	Queens of the Stone Age	Alternative rock; desert rock; garage rock; hard rock
12	Good to Go-Go	Spyro Gyra	Jazz; jazz fusion
15	Icky Thump	The White Stripes	Garage rock; alternative rock; punk blues; blues rock
18	Who We Are	Lifehouse	Alternative rock; pop rock
19	Lost Highway	Bon Jovi	Country rock; country; pop rock
19	Notebook Paper	Huey	Hip-hop
19	5th Gear	Brad Paisley	Country
19	Rival Factions	Project 86	Christian rock; nu metal; alternative metal
19	Rockstar Mentality	Shop Boyz	Southern hip-hop; rap rock
19	The Needles the Space	Straylight Run	Alternative rock; indie rock
25	Greatest Hits	Social Distortion	Punk rock; alternative rock
26	The Mix-Up	Beastie Boys	Instrumental rock; jazz-funk; funk rock; funk; soul jazz
26	My December	Kelly Clarkson	Pop rock; rock
26	Hannah Montana 2: Meet Miley Cyrus	Miley Cyrus	Pop rock
26	Hiding Inside the Horrible Weather	My American Heart	Alternative rock; indie rock; emo
26	A Flair for the Dramatic	Pierce the Veil	Emo; punk rock; post-hardcore

=== July ===
Date	Album	Artist	Genre(s)
3	3OH!3	3OH!3	Synth-pop; electronic rock
3	T.I. vs. T.I.P.	T.I.	Hip-hop
3	Libertad	Velvet Revolver	Hard rock; rock
9	Three Easy Pieces	Buffalo Tom	Alternative rock
10	New Wave	Against Me!	Alternative rock; punk rock
10	New Maps of Hell	Bad Religion	Melodic hardcore; skate punk
10	Coco	Colbie Caillat	Pop; pop rock; folk pop
10	Our Love to Admire	Interpol	Alternative rock; indie rock; rock
10	A Lesson in Romantics	Mayday Parade	Alternative rock; emo; pop-punk
10	Zeitgeist	The Smashing Pumpkins	Alternative rock; rock
10	Ga Ga Ga Ga Ga	Spoon	Indie rock; indie pop; alternative rock
16	Secret Weapon	MxPx	Punk rock; pop-punk; skate punk
17	Ameritown	Eastern Conference Champions	Indie rock
17	One Cell in the Sea	A Fine Frenzy	Indie pop; indie rock; pop rock
17	Insomnia	Hed PE	Nu metal; rap metal
17	Do You Feel	The Rocket Summer	Alternative rock; pop rock; pop-punk
17	Calling the World	Rooney	Alternative rock; pop rock; power pop
17	Paper Walls	Yellowcard	Emo; pop-punk
23	Absolute Garbage	Garbage	Alternative rock
24	Church Mouth	Portugal. The Man	Indie rock; blues rock
24	Planet Earth	Prince	R&B; pop; funk; rock
24	Hands Across the Void	Tiny Vipers	Folk; folk rock; indie pop
31	Finding Forever	Common	Hip-hop; neo soul
31	The Way of the Fist	Five Finger Death Punch	Groove metal; heavy metal; alternative metal
31	Untitled	Korn	Nu metal; alternative metal; rock
31	True Beauty	Mandisa	Gospel; CCM; R&B
31	Direction	The Starting Line	Alternative rock; pop-punk

=== August ===
Date	Album	Artist	Genre(s)
7	Sustain	Buck-O-Nine	Ska punk
7	Full Circle	Drowning Pool	Post-grunge; alternative metal
7	Lucy Gray	Envy on the Coast	Pop-punk; emo; post-hardcore
7	Constantine	Constantine Maroulis	Rock
7	The Real Testament	Plies	Southern hip hop; dirty rap; gangsta rap
7	The Earth Sings Mi Fa Mi	The Receiving End of Sirens	Emo; progressive rock; post-hardcore
7	Chronchitis	Slightly Stoopid	Reggae; reggae rock
7	Underground Kingz	UGK	Southern hip hop; hip-hop
14	CexCells	Blaqk Audio	Electronic rock; synth-pop; alternative rock
14	Combinations	Eisley	Indie pop; Christian pop
14	Singularity	Mae	Power pop; alternative rock; indie rock
17	Under the Blacklight	Rilo Kiley	Indie pop; indie rock; alternative rock
20	Wolves	Idiot Pilot	Alternative rock; post-hardcore; electronic rock
20	Planet of Ice	Minus the Bear	Indie rock; progressive rock
20	The World Has Made Me the Man of My Dreams	Meshell Ndegeocello	Jazz
21	Kill the Headlights	Adema	Nu metal
21	An Ocean Between Us	As I Lay Dying	Melodic metalcore
21	Cartel	Cartel	Pop-punk; power pop
21	We're in Like Sin	Just Surrender	Pop-punk; emo; power pop; post-hardcore
21	Butterfly Pinned	Monster in the Machine	Alternative rock; rock
21	All Day	The Pietasters	Ska
28	Lead Sails Paper Anchor	Atreyu	Metalcore; alternative metal; hard rock
28	Scream & Light Up the Sky	The Honorary Title	Alternative rock; emo; indie rock
28	East Side Story	Emily King	R&B; soul; hip-hop
28	Lost & Found	Ledisi	R&B
28	Scary Kids Scaring Kids	Scary Kids Scaring Kids	Post-hardcore; emo; alternative rock
28	Bring on the Comets	VHS or Beta	Electronic rock; alternative rock

=== September ===
Date	Album	Artist	Genre(s)
4	Bone Palace Ballet	Chiodos	Alternative rock; emo; post-hardcore
4	Love Grenade	Ted Nugent	Hard rock; rock
11	Just Who I Am: Poets & Pirates	Kenny Chesney	Country
11	Curtis	50 Cent	East coast hip-hop
11	Autumn of the Seraphs	Pinback	Indie rock
11	Graduation	Kanye West	Hip-hop
18	Bitchin'	The Donnas	Alternative rock; rock; punk rock
18	The Meanest of Times	Dropkick Murphys	Celtic punk; punk rock; alternative rock
18	Rise or Die Trying	Four Year Strong	Pop-punk; punk rock
18	Let's Stay Friends	Les Savy Fav	Indie rock
18	Reba: Duets	Reba McEntire	Country
18	Metro Station	Metro Station	Pop rock; synth-pop; alternative rock
18	Trees Outside the Academy	Thurston Moore	Alternative rock; rock
18	Even If It Kills Me	Motion City Soundtrack	Alternative rock; pop-punk; emo
18	From the Screen to Your Stereo Part II	New Found Glory	Pop-punk; pop rock; covers
18	Asleep at Heaven's Gate	Rogue Wave	Indie rock; alternative rock
18	Into the Wild	Eddie Vedder	Folk rock
19	Songs About Girls	will.i.am	Hip-hop; electronic
25	So Wrong, It's Right	All Time Low	Pop-punk; emo; alternative rock; pop rock
25	Silent Treatment	The Bled	Metalcore; post-hardcore
25	Italia	Chris Botti	Jazz
25	Just Like You	Keyshia Cole	R&B
25	Echoes, Silence, Patience & Grace	Foo Fighters	Alternative rock; post-grunge; hard rock
25	River: The Joni Letters	Herbie Hancock	Jazz
25	Funk This	Chaka Khan	R&B; soul
25	This Is Love	Ann Nesby	Funk; soul
25	Trav'lin' Light	Queen Latifah	Vocal jazz; R&B
25	Still Feels Good	Rascal Flatts	Country pop
25	The Real Thing: Words and Sounds Vol. 3	Jill Scott	Neo-soul
25	Magic	Bruce Springsteen	Rock

=== October ===
Date	Album	Artist	Genre(s)
2	Another Animal	Another Animal	Post-grunge; alternative metal; hard rock
2	Cowboy Town	Brooks & Dunn	Country; rock
2	The Shade of Poison Trees	Dashboard Confessional	Emo; pop rock
2	Revival	John Fogerty	Roots rock; Americana; heartland rock
2	Back of My Lac'	J. Holiday	R&B; hip-hop
2	Oracular Spectacular	MGMT	Electronic rock; synth-pop; psychedelic pop; alternative rock
2	Souljaboytellem.com	Soulja Boy Tell 'Em	Snap
2	No Really, I'm Fine	The Spill Canvas	Alternative rock; emo; pop-punk
2	We the Kings	We the Kings	Pop-punk; pop rock; alternative rock
5	Blackbird	Alter Bridge	Alternative metal; hard rock
9	Cease to Begin	Band of Horses	Indie rock
9	Heroes & Thieves	Vanessa Carlton	Pop rock
9	Rock n Roll Jesus	Kid Rock	Rock; hard rock; heartland rock
9	Famous	Puddle of Mudd	Post-grunge; rock; hard rock
9	Family	LeAnn Rimes	Country
9	This Is Forever	She Wants Revenge	Alternative rock; dark wave
14	Sounds of the Season	Elliott Yamin	Christmas
16	Fight with Tools	Flobots	Rap rock; alternative hip-hop; alternative rock
16	Chase This Light	Jimmy Eat World	Alternative rock; pop rock; pop-punk; power pop
16	Make Sure They See My Face	Kenna	Electronic; electronic rock
16	Trampoline	Steel Train	Folk rock; indie folk
16	The Alchemy Index Vols. I & II	Thrice	Post-hardcore; Christian hardcore; ambient; electronic; trip hop
22	Elect the Dead	Serj Tankian	Rock; hard rock; alternative rock
23	Living Hard	Gary Allan	Country
23	See the Light	Bo Bice	Rock; southern rock; country rock
23	¡Viva la Cobra!	Cobra Starship	Pop-punk; pop rock; dance-rock; dance-punk
23	Good Apollo, I'm Burning Star IV, Volume Two: No World for Tomorrow	Coheed and Cambria	Alternative rock; progressive rock; emo; pop-punk
23	51/50 Ratchet	Hurricane Chris	Hip-hop; southern hip-hop; crunk; R&B
23	Raising Sand	Robert Plant & Alison Krauss	Americana; folk; country
23	In Defense of the Genre	Say Anything	Alternative rock; emo; pop rock; pop-punk
23	Carnival Ride	Carrie Underwood	Country
23	La Cucaracha	Ween	Experimental rock; alternative rock
30	Smile for Them	Armor for Sleep	Alternative rock; emo; pop-punk; post-hardcore
30	Avenged Sevenfold	Avenged Sevenfold	Heavy metal; alternative metal; rock
30	Cyclone	Baby Bash	Hip-hop; crunk; R&B
30	Unbreakable	Backstreet Boys	Pop; R&B; dance-pop
30	Bend to Break	The Color Fred	Alternative rock; emo; power pop; indie rock
30	Long Road Out of Eden	Eagles	Rock
30	Don't Let Go	Justin McBride	Country
30	"V" Is for Vagina	Puscifer	Alternative rock; electronic
30	Under the Boards	Saves the Day	Pop-punk; emo; alternative rock
30	Blackout	Britney Spears	Dance-pop; electropop; techno; avant-disco
30	Kill the House Lights	Thursday	Emo; post-hardcore; alternative rock
30	Everything Is Fine	Josh Turner	Country
30	Get Stoked on It!	The Wonder Years	Easycore; pop-punk

=== November ===
Date	Album	Artist	Genre(s)
1	I-Empire	Angels & Airwaves	Alternative rock; space rock
1	The Inevitable Rise and Liberation of NiggyTardust!	Saul Williams	Industrial hip-hop; alternative rock
5	Ire Works	The Dillinger Escape Plan	Metalcore; post-hardcore
5	Friend (EP)	Grizzly Bear	Indie rock
6	Exclusive	Chris Brown	R&B
6	Kingdom Come	Jay-Z	Hip-hop
6	A Place to Land	Little Big Town	Country
6	4-Way Diablo	Monster Magnet	Stoner rock; rock
6	Vengeance	Nonpoint	Nu metal
8	Like a Waterfall	James Marsters	Blues; blues rock
9	As I Am	Alicia Keys	R&B
9	Sawdust	The Killers	Alternative rock
13	Somewhere in the Between	Streetlight Manifesto	Ska punk
13	Heaven, Heartache and the Power of Love	Trisha Yearwood	Country
20	Dreaming Out Loud	OneRepublic	Pop; R&B
20	Jordin Sparks	Jordin Sparks	Pop; R&B

=== December ===
Date	Album	Artist	Genre(s)
4	A.D.D. (Audio Day Dream)	Blake Lewis	Pop rock; hip-hop; electronic; soul
4	Galore Galore	Sponge	Alternative rock
11	8 Diagrams	Wu-Tang Clan	Hip-hop
18	Growing Pains	Mary J. Blige	R&B
18	Lupe Fiasco's The Cool	Lupe Fiasco	Progressive rap
25	Strictly Leakage	Atmosphere	Hip-hop

== Top Songs on Record ==
=== Billboard Hot 100 No. 1 Songs ===
- "Beautiful Girls" – Sean Kingston (4 weeks)
- "Big Girls Don't Cry" – Fergie (1 week)
- "Buy U a Drank (Shawty Snappin')" – T-Pain feat. Yung Joc (1 week)
- "Crank That (Soulja Boy)" – Soulja Boy Tell 'Em (7 weeks)
- "Don't Matter" – Akon (2 weeks)
- "Girlfriend" – Avril Lavigne (1 week)
- "Give It to Me" – Timbaland feat. Nelly Furtado and Justin Timberlake (2 weeks)
- "Glamorous" – Fergie ft. Ludacris (2 weeks)
- "Hey There Delilah" – Plain White T's (2 weeks)
- "Irreplaceable" – Beyoncé (3 weeks in 2006, 7 weeks in 2007)
- "Kiss Kiss" – Chris Brown ft. T-Pain (3 weeks)
- "Makes Me Wonder" – Maroon 5 (3 weeks)
- "No One" – Alicia Keys (5 weeks)
- "Say It Right" – Nelly Furtado (1week)
- "Stronger" – Kanye West (1 week)
- "This Is Why I'm Hot" – Mims (2 weeks)
- "Umbrella" – Rihanna ft. Jay-Z (7 weeks)
- "What Goes Around... Comes Around" – Justin Timberlake (1 week)

=== Billboard Hot 100 Top 20 Hits ===
All songs that reached the Top 20 on the Billboard Hot 100 chart during the year, complete with peak chart placement.

- "1234" – Feist (#8)
- "A Bay Bay" – Hurricane Chris (#7)
- "Apologize" – Timbaland feat. OneRepublic (#2)
- "Ayo Technology" – 50 Cent (#5)
- "Bartender" – T-Pain feat. Akon (#5)
- "Because of You" – Ne-Yo (#2)
- "Bed" – J. Holiday (#5)
- "Beautiful Girls" – Sean Kingston (#1)
- "Beautiful Liar" – Beyoncé and Shakira (#3)
- "Before He Cheats" – Carrie Underwood (#8)
- "Big Girls Don't Cry" – Fergie (#1)
- "Big Shit Poppin' (Do It)" – T.I. (#9)
- "Bubbly" – Colbie Caillat (#5)
- "Buy U a Drank (Shawty Snappin')" – T-Pain feat. Yung Joc (#1)
- "Crank That (Soulja Boy)" – Soulja Boy Tell 'Em (#1)
- "Clumsy" – Fergie (#5)
- "Cupid's Chokehold" – Gym Class Heroes ft. Patrick Stump (#4)
- "Cyclone" – Baby Bash ft. T-Pain (#7)
- "Don't Matter" – Akon (#1)
- "Fergalicious" – Fergie (#6 in 2006, #2 in 2007)
- "Get It Shawty" – Lloyd (#16)
- "Gimme More" – Britney Spears (#3)
- "Girlfriend" – Avril Lavigne (#1)
- "Give It to Me" – Timbaland feat. Nelly Furtado and Justin Timberlake (#1)
- "Glamorous" – Fergie ft. Ludacris (#1)
- "Good Life" – Kanye West ft. T-Pain (#7)
- "Hate That I Love You" – Rihanna feat. Ne-Yo (#7)
- "Hey There Delilah" – Plain White T's (#1)
- "Home" – Daughtry (#5)
- "Hypnotized" – Plies feat. Akon (#14)
- "I Get Money" – 50 Cent (#20)
- "I Tried" – Bone Thugs-n-Harmony ft. Akon (#6)
- "Ice Box" – Omarion (#12)
- "If Everyone Cared" – Nickelback (#17)
- "It Ends Tonight" – The All-American Rejects (#8)
- "It's Not Over" – Daughtry (#4)
- "I'm a Flirt" – R. Kelly / Bow Wow feat. T.I. & T-Pain (#12
- "I'll Stand by You" – Carrie Underwood (#6
- "Irreplaceable" – Beyoncé (#1)
- "Last Night" – Diddy ft. Keyshia Cole (#10)
- "Let It Go" – Keyshia Cole (#7)
- "Lip Gloss" – Lil Mama (#10)
- "Lost Without U" – Robin Thicke (#14)
- "LoveStoned" – Justin Timberlake (#17)
- "Kiss Kiss" – Chris Brown ft. T-Pain (#1)
- "Make It Rain" – Fat Joe feat. Lil Wayne (#13)
- "Make Me Better" – Fabolous feat. Ne-Yo (#8)
- "Makes Me Wonder" – Maroon 5 (#1)
- "Never Again" – Kelly Clarkson (#8)
- "No One" – Alicia Keys (#1)
- "Not Ready to Make Nice" – Dixie Chicks (#4)
- "On the Hotline" – Pretty Ricky (#12)
- "Over You" – Daughtry (#18)
- "Paralyzer" – Finger Eleven (#10)
- "Party Like a Rockstar" – Shop Boyz (#2)
- "Pop, Lock & Drop It" – Huey (#6)
- "Rehab" – Amy Winehouse (#9)
- "Rockstar" – Nickelback (#6)
- "Runaway Love" – Ludacris ft. Mary J. Blige (#2)
- "Same Girl" – R. Kelly & Usher (#20)
- "Say It Right" – Nelly Furtado (#1)
- "Shawty" – Plies feat. T-Pain (#9)
- "Stronger" – Kanye West (#1)
- "So Small" – Carrie Underwood (#17)
- "Sorry, Blame It on Me" – Akon (#7)
- "Superstar" – Lupe Fiasco feat. Matthew Santos (#10)
- "The Sweet Escape" – Gwen Stefani feat. Akon (#2)
- "Take Me There" – Rascal Flatts (#19)
- "Tattoo" – Jordin Sparks (#8)
- "This Ain't a Scene, It's an Arms Race" – Fall Out Boy (#2)
- "Thnks Fr Th Mmrs" – Fall Out Boy (#11)
- "This Is My Now" – Jordin Sparks (#15)
- "This Is Why I'm Hot" – Mims (#1)
- "Throw Some D's" – Rich Boy feat. Polow da Don (#6)
- "Summer Love" – Justin Timberlake (#6)
- "U + Ur Hand" – Pink (#2)
- "Umbrella" – Rihanna ft. Jay-Z (#1)
- "Until the End of Time" – Justin Timberlake feat. Beyoncé (#17)
- "Wait for You" – Elliott Yamin (#13)
- "Waiting on the World to Change" – John Mayer (#3)
- "Walk It Out" – Unk (#10)
- "Wake Up Call" – Maroon 5 (#19)
- "The Way I Are" – Timbaland feat. Keri Hilson (#3)
- "We Fly High" – Jim Jones (#5)
- "Welcome to the Black Parade" – My Chemical Romance (#9)
- "What Goes Around... Comes Around" – Justin Timberlake (#1)
- "What I've Done" – Linkin Park (#7)
- "White & Nerdy" – "Weird Al" Yankovic (#9)
- "Who Knew" – Pink (#9)
- "You" – Lloyd ft. Lil Wayne (#9)

== Deaths ==
- January 1 – Julius Hegyi, 83, conductor and violinist
  - Tad Jones, 54, jazz music historian
  - Del Reeves, 74, country music singer
- January 6 – Sneaky Pete Kleinow, 72, country rock musician (The Flying Burrito Brothers)
- January 7 – Alice Coltrane, 69, jazz musician
- January 13 – Doyle Holly, 70, bass player and songwriter (The Buckaroos)
- March 9 – Brad Delp, 55, rock singer (Boston)
- November 19 – Kevin DuBrow, 52, heavy metal singer (Quiet Riot)
- November 24 – Casey Calvert, 26, alternative rock guitarist (Hawthorne Heights)
- December 12 – Ike Turner, 76, rock and roll & R&B singer, songwriter and bandleader
