= The Rocket Summer discography =

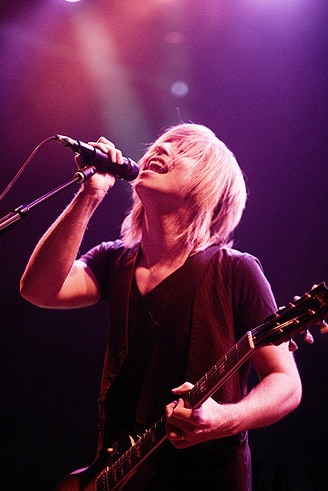
- The Rocket Summer live during AP Tour 2008.
- Studio albums: 6
- Extended plays: 5
- Live albums: 2
- Singles: 16
- Music videos: 15

The discography of the Rocket Summer, the rock solo project of Stephen Bryce Avary, consists of seven studio albums, five EPs, one compilation album, one live album and twenty-three singles.

== Albums ==
=== Studio albums ===
Year	Album details	Peak chart positions					
Year	Album details	US	US Rock	US Christian	US Heatseekers	US Independent	CAN
2003	Calendar Days: Released: February 8, 2003; Label: Militia Muzik; Producers: Bryce Avary	—	—	—	—	—	—
2005	Hello, Good Friend: Released: May 17, 2005; Label: Militia Muzik; Producer: Bryce Avary / Tim O'Heir	—	—	—	26	26	—
2007	Do You Feel: Released: July 17, 2007; Label: Island Def Jam; Producer: Bryce Avary / Jim Wirt	44	16	—	—	—	—
2010	Of Men and Angels: Released: February 23, 2010; Label: Island Def Jam; Producer: Bryce Avary / CJ Eiriksson	38	4	2	—	—	—
2012	Life Will Write the Words: Released: June 5, 2012; Label: Aviate Records; Producer: Bryce Avary	58	23	2	—	12	175
2016	Zoetic: Released: February 26, 2016; Label: Aviate Records; Producer: Bryce Avary	—	31	—	—	17	—
2019	Sweet Shivers: Released: August 2, 2019; Label: Aviate Records; Producer: Bryce Avary	—	—	—	—	—	—
2023	Shadowkasters: Released: May 12, 2023; Label: Aviate Records; Producers: Bryce Avary	—	—	—	—	—	—

=== Live albums ===
Title	Album details
Connect Sets	Released: 2006; Label: Sony Music Distribution; Formats: CD
Bryce Avary, His Instruments and Your Voices	Released: May 24, 2011; Label: Bryce Avary; Formats: Digital download

== Extended plays ==
Year	Album details	Peak chart positions		
Year	Album details	US	US Digital	US Ind.
2000	The Rocket Summer: Released March 2000; Label: The Rocket Summer	—	—	—
2006	The Early Years: Released on 14 November 2006; Label: Militia Muzik	—	—	—
2007	Do You Feel iTunes EP: Released on 22 May 2007; Label: Island Def Jam	—	—	—
2009	You Gotta Believe: Released on 26 October 2009; Label: Island Def Jam	114	23	—
2010	Of Men and Angels: B-Sides: Released 10 October 2010; Label: Island Def jam			
2013	Christmas Madness: Released on 3 December 2013; Label: Aviate Records	—	—	45

== Singles ==
Year	Single	Album
2003	"Skies So Blue"	Calendar Days
2004	"This Is Me"	Calendar Days
2005	"Brat Pack"	Hello, Good Friend
2007	"So Much Love"	Do You Feel
2007	"Do You Feel"	Do You Feel
2009	"You Gotta Believe"	Of Men and Angels
2010	"Walls"	Of Men and Angels
2010	"Hills and Valleys"	Of Men and Angels
2012	"Run and Don't Stop"	Life Will Write the Words
2012	"Revival"	Life Will Write the Words
2012	"200,000"	Life Will Write the Words
2013	"Just For A Moment Forget Who You Are"	Life Will Write the Words
2013	"Soldiers"	Life Will Write the Words
2013	"Underrated"	Life Will Write the Words
2016	"Same Air"	Zoetic
2016	"FL, CA"	Zoetic
2017	"Gone Too Long"	Non-album
2019	"Shatter Us"	Sweet Shivers
2019	"Morning Light"	Sweet Shivers
2019	"Peace Signs"	Sweet Shivers
2019	"Blankets"	Sweet Shivers
2022	"M4U"	Shadowkasters
2023	"Stuck Inside Your Light"	Shadowkasters
2024	"Don't Be Yourself"	Non-album

== Compilation appearances ==
Year	Song(s)	Album
2003	"Skies So Blue"	The Militia Group
2003	"This is Me"	The Militia Group
2004	"High Life"	Dead and Dreaming: An Indie Tribute to Counting Crows (Counting Crows cover)
2004	"What We Hate We Make"	Hello, We Are The Militia Group
2008	"Bitter Sweet Symphony"	Digital single for VH1 Save the Music Foundation (The Verve cover)
2011	"MAPS"	Hello Somebody, Vol. 1 (Yeah Yeah Yeahs cover)
2018	"Another Day"	Digital single, co-written and co-performed with Sleeping with Sirens

== Videography ==
=== Music videos ===
Year	Title	Director
2003	"Skies So Blue"	
2004	"This is Me"	
2006	"Brat Pack"	
2007	"So Much Love"	Shane Drake
2008	"Do You Feel"	Nate Weaver / Bryce Avary
2009	"You Gotta Believe"	Randy Scott Slavin
2010	"Hills and Valleys"	
2012	"Run and Don't Stop"	
2012	"Revival"	
2012	"200,000"	Marshall Burnette
2013	"Just For A Moment Forget Who You Are"	Jade Ehlers
2013	"Soldiers"	Jade Ehlers
2013	"Underrated"	Jade Ehlers
2016	"Same Air"	Justin Giritlian and Nathan Sam
2016	"FL, CA"	Greg Hunter
2017	"Gone Too Long"	Morgan Freed and Jon Ryan
2019	"Shatter Us"	Ben Busch and Dillon Slack
2019	"Morning Light"	Ben Busch and Dillon Slack
2019	"Blankets"	Ben Busch and Dillon Slack
2019	"Peace Signs"	Ben Busch and Dillon Slack
2019	"5 4 3 2 1 Z"	Ben Busch and Dillon Slack
2022	"M4U"	Nicky Parks
2023	"Stuck Inside Your Light"	Seth Ringger
