= Walls (The Rocket Summer song) =

Single by The Rocket Summer

from the album Of Men and Angels
- Released: February 2010
- Recorded: 2009
- Genre: Pop rock Power pop
- Length: 4:48
- Label: Island Def Jam
- Songwriter: Bryce Avary

The Rocket Summer singles chronology
"Do You Feel" (2006)	"Walls" (2010)

"Walls" is the lead single from The Rocket Summer's album Of Men and Angels. The song was written by The Rocket Summer frontman-and sole member-Bryce Avary, and was released in February 2010. In an interview with AOL, Avary stated that the song is "about struggles and about having issues in your life that you just can't seem to quite get a grip on, whether that's depression or whether that's anything."

== Promotion ==
The Rocket Summer premiered the single in an acoustic performance at To Write Love On Her Arms' Heavy and Light on January 9, 2010. On January 13, 2010, "Walls" became available for listening on the band's MySpace. Shortly after Of Men and Angels's release, Avary performed the album's lead single "Walls" on KDFW's Good Day Dallas and KTBC's Good Day Austin to promote the album.

In April 2010, the song was used as the backing track in NBC's television show Friday Night Lights' promotional ads, and was featured later that month on NBC's The Biggest Loser.
