= Splashh =

Indie rock band based in London, England

- Origin: Hackney, London, England
- Genres: Indie rock, alternative rock
- Years active: 2012–2018
- Labels: Cinematic Music Group; Inertia; Luv Luv Luv; Kissabillity; Kanine; Breakaway Recordings
- Past members: Sasha Frantz Carlson; Taddeo "Toto" Vivian MacDonald; Thomas Beal; Jaie Gonzalez; Jacob Moore
- Website: www.splashhband.com

Splashh were an Anglo-Australian indie rock band, formed in 2012 in Hackney, East London. The band was composed of frontman and guitarist Sasha Frantz Carlson, guitarist/synth player Taddeo "Toto" Vivian MacDonald, bassist Thomas Beal, and synth player Jaie Gonzalez.

Although formed in London, none of the band were from the city. Carlson is from Auckland, New Zealand, Vivian born in Italy and raised in Byron Bay, Australia, Beal from Shifnal, England and Gonzalez from Australia.

In June 2018, the band announced they were going on an indefinite hiatus.

== History ==
=== Formation and Comfort (2012–2013) ===
At a New Year's Eve party in December 2011, Sasha Carlson, formerly of Pineapple Head, Colours and The Coshercot Honeys/Brain Slaves first brought up the idea of forming a band with Taddeo "Toto" Vivian, whom he had met on a previous trip to London in 2010. In February 2012, Carlson moved to London from Australia and began writing and recording songs with Vivian in Vivian's flat in Hackney. The duo then expanded their lineup to include Vivian's former INTL bandmate Tom Beal on bass, who had also previously been a member of Shropshire-based band Ripchord. INTL also featured both Oliver Burslem and Andy Jones, who went on to form Yak. The lineup was completed with drummer Jacob Moore, who was a member of Auckland-based band The Checks, and joined the band shortly before Splashh's first concert on 2 May 2012.

In 2012, the band signed to Luv Luv Luv and released three singles: "Need It", "Vacation" and "All I Wanna Do" in the UK. The band released their debut studio album Comfort in the US on 4 June 2013 via Kanine Records, and on 2 September 2013 via Luv Luv Luv in the UK. Despite recording songs as a full band with Death in Vegas' Richard Fearless producing, Comfort was compiled from the earliest demos recorded and produced by Vivian in his home studio setup in London with just he and Carlson performing. Vivian confirmed the band's second album would be recorded as a full band, that the band regularly jammed in soundchecks and were becoming a more collaborative unit.

Throughout 2013, the band toured extensively, playing festivals worldwide such as Field Day, Benicàssim, Liverpool Sound City, Best Kept Secret Festival, Midi Festival, Hultsfred Festival and Reading and Leeds Festivals. The band also undertook a full US tour in April 2013 playing with The Generationals and Blood Red Shoes.

=== Honey + Salt – discarded album (2013–2016) ===
In November 2013, Carlson re-located to New York City where he began working with producer and multi-instrumentalist Jaie Gonzalez, with the duo performing shows together as Splashh in Brooklyn from November to December 2013. In February 2014, Vivian and Beal joined the pair to continue work on their second album, with Carlson stating that it would be more synth and loop based than their debut album. On 1 March 2014, the band announced that they had parted ways with drummer Jacob Moore, the reason for his departure was not commented on.

The band sporadically toured the US throughout 2014, performing mostly new material, including shows at SXSW and the CMJ Festival in New York City. New songs premiered included: "646", "Comeback Soon", "Under The Moon", "Pure Blue", "Feel It 2" and "Colour It In".

On 29 September 2014, the band posted the music video for "Colour It In" and put the song on SoundCloud. On 10 October 2014, before Splashh's CMJ 2014 performances, the band announced that Brooklyn-based, Australian-born musician Angus Tarnawsky would join the group on drums. Tarnawsky is also a member of Apache Beat and has toured with Temples, Brian Chase and Au.Ra.

In March 2015, Splashh played their first shows in the UK since November 2013.

The band's comeback single "Pure Blue" was released as a single in November 2015 via Luv Luv Luv. The song was recorded in Vivian's London home studio and features Dominic Boyce, from Peace, on drums. It was mixed by New York City-based producer Nicolas Vernhes.

The band split time between London and New York City from 2014 to early 2016, working on material for their second album entitled Honey + Salt, commenting on the change in direction, Vivian commented that they had "always wanted to move into more experimental, synth-based dance music", with Carlson adding that they had become "massively bored" of their previous material. Honey + Salt was eventually scrapped in 2016.

=== Waiting a Lifetime and subsequent hiatus (2016–2018) ===
On 4 May 2016, the band announced that they had signed to the Cinematic Music Group label and were set to record their second album Waiting A Lifetime in New York City the following week, abandoning the previous work over the last two years and returning to their garage rock guitar sound. This time, the album featured bassist Beal and drummer Gonzalez's playing and songwriting contributions. The album was recorded in Vernhes' Rare Book Room studio and was completed in June 2016. Waiting A Lifetime was released 14 April 2017 via Cinematic Music Group and Pod / Inertia Music in Australia and New Zealand.

On 5 May 2018, the band announced they were going on an indefinite hiatus, stating in an online post: "It has come to the end of a era for us for now. For the time being we will be taking a possible indefinite hiatus to focus on our own separate projects".

== Band members ==
=== Members ===
- Sasha Frantz Carlson – lead vocals, guitar, tambourine (2012–2018)
- Taddeo "Toto" Vivian MacDonald – guitar, backing vocals, synthesizer (2012–2018)
- Thomas Beal – bass guitar (2012–2018)
- Jaie Gonzalez – keyboard, synthesizer (2013–2018)
- Jacob Moore – drums (2012–2014)

== Discography ==
=== Studio albums ===
- Comfort (2013)
- Waiting a Lifetime (2017)

=== Singles ===
- "All I Wanna Do" (2012)
- "Need It" / "Headspins" (2012)
- "Vacation" (2013)
- "All I Wanna Do" (re-release) / "Today Fade Away" (2013)
- "Feels Like You" (2013)
- "Sun Kissed Bliss" (2013)
- "Pure Blue" / "Nobody Loves You Like I Do" (2015)
- "Rings" (2016)
- "Waiting a Lifetime" (2017)
