= Angus Tarnawsky =

Australian artist and musician (born 1988)

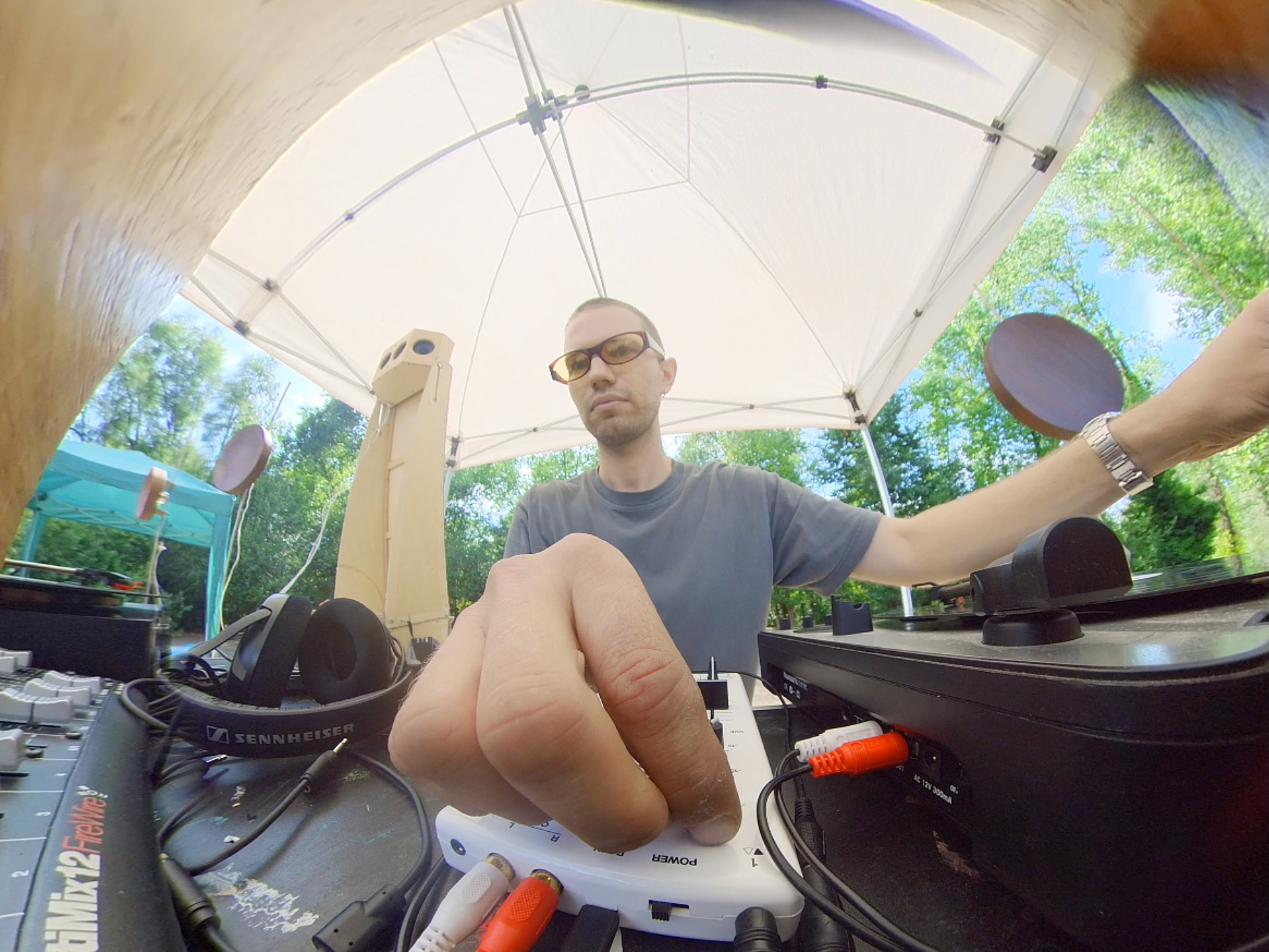

Background information
- Born: 1988 (age 37–38)
- Origin: Launceston, Tasmania
- Genres: Experimental, electronic, sound art, punk rock
- Occupations: Musician, artist, curator, researcher
- Instruments: Drums, modular synthesizer
- Years active: 2005–present
- Website: angustarnawsky.com

Angus Tarnawsky is an Australian-Canadian artist, musician, curator and researcher. He holds a PhD in Communication from Concordia University, an MFA in Interdisciplinary Media, Art and Design from OCAD University and a Bachelor of Music Performance (Honours) from the Victorian College of the Arts. He relocated from Australia to Brooklyn, New York in 2010 to join the motorik influenced rock band, Apache Beat, and since 2018, he has primarily lived and worked in Canada.

As a solo artist, he creates electro-acoustic/electronic music and exhibits sound installations. In 2014, his debut EP was released by the Berlin-based record label Inner Surface Music. That same year the Melbourne Next Wave Festival premiered his first installation project "Artifacts," with pianist Nathan Liow. He has collaborated on a wide range of projects, including work with visual artist, Stanislava Pinchuk, musician Brian Chase, and choreographer Duane Cyrus. He is also the curator of the experimental record label In Context Music.

Between 2015 and 2017 he was the drummer and recording engineer for the punk band Flowers of Evil, recording two full-length albums. As a session drummer he has toured and recorded with various artists including Crocodiles, Haunted Hearts, Devin Therriault, Temples, Au.Ra, Cleopold, Splashh, and Ballet School.
