= Natural Selection (Art Department album) =

2014 album by DJ Jonny White and Kenny Glasgow's project Art Department

Natural Selection is the second studio album by Canadian DJ Jonny White and Kenny Glasgow's project Art Department. It was released on November 18, 2014 on White's label No. 19 Music.

== Critical reception ==
Professional ratings
Aggregate scores
Source	Rating
Album of the Year	60/100
Metacritic	72/100
Review scores
Source	Rating
AllMusic	4/5 stars
Clash	7/10
Las Vegas Weekly	2/5 stars
musicOMH	2.5/5 stars
Now	3/5 stars
Q	4/5 stars
Resident Advisor	2/5

Critical reviews for Natural Selection were generally mixed. AllMusic's David Jeffries was positive towards the album as a unique mixture of a "nocturnal and cool profile" with mainstream pop music elements such as "hip-hop-styled shouts and quirky lyrics." As he stated in a nutshell, "Art Department shape all [their] influences into a sound that's entirely their own dream world, one where David Lynch, shoegaze, and dream pop are all touchstones, yet there's a youthful edge and their pointed, post-everything attitude is always ready to burst any pre-conceived bubbles." Differently, Clash, while considering it a decent house album, felt it was too traditional of its style to elevate it above similar records. In less favorable reviews, the Las Vegas Weekly criticized Natural Selection for possibly being too alienating to mainstream electronic dance listeners, primarily due to "its menacing basslines boasting an edge rather than fluidity and Glasgow rendering his vocals so melancholic that it pushes AD’s post-millennial electronic forays further into dystopia." musicOMH similarly summarized that, despite having the right "present and correct" sounds and structures, the album's potential was ruined by a lack of energy, where the listener feels "tired but not even being able to move to go to bed."

While Jeffries called Natural Selection an improvement over The Drawing Board and Renowned for Sound writer Mitchell Bozzetto claimed the Art Department's mission towards a more "mature" sound "definitely pays off," other critics found it inferior to the duo's debut. Tony Naylor of Resident Advisor dismissed Natural Selection as "a diffuse bunch of half-realised ideas," stating it was a far less "definitive statement" than The Drawing Board; in his opinion, it replaced the "devastatingly simple" pop house style of the prior album with "weak stylistic shifts," "banal collaborations," "pointless interludes," and a more limited use of Glasgow's singing. Now's Benjamin Boles was more appreciative of the group's move from a less danceable style to something more experimental; however, he still thought The Drawing Board was more of a "big impression" and that Natural Selection's risks "sometimes pay off but lead to mixed results overall"; he claimed the album worked best "when [the duo] let their experimental impulses coexist with their pop instincts."
