= Of Men and Angels: B-Sides =

Of Men And Angels: B-Sides

EP by The Rocket Summer
- Released: October 19, 2010
- Genres: Pop rock, alternative rock
- Label: Island Def Jam

The Rocket Summer chronology
Of Men and Angels (2010)	Of Men And Angels: B-Sides (2010)	Life Will Write The Words (2012)

Of Men And Angels: B-Sides is a 2010 EP by The Rocket Summer. It was released on October 19, 2010. It contain songs that didn't make the cut of The Rocket Summer album Of Men and Angels.

== Track listing ==
All tracks are written by Bryce Avary.

No.	Title	Length
1.	"Every If and Every Why"	4:03
2.	"The Fight"	3:14
3.	"Say"	4:06
4.	"How Many Times"	3:58
5.	"Peace Come Over You"	4:49
