= Daniel Bishop =

Daniel Bishop may refer to:

- Dan Bishop (born 1964), American attorney and politician; U.S. Representative from North Carolina
- Daniel Bishop, American drummer for Christian rock band Slingshot 57
- Daniel Bishop Meigs (1835–1916), Canadian politician
- Daniel Bishop (1875–1891), American Medal of Honor recipient
