= In Context Music =

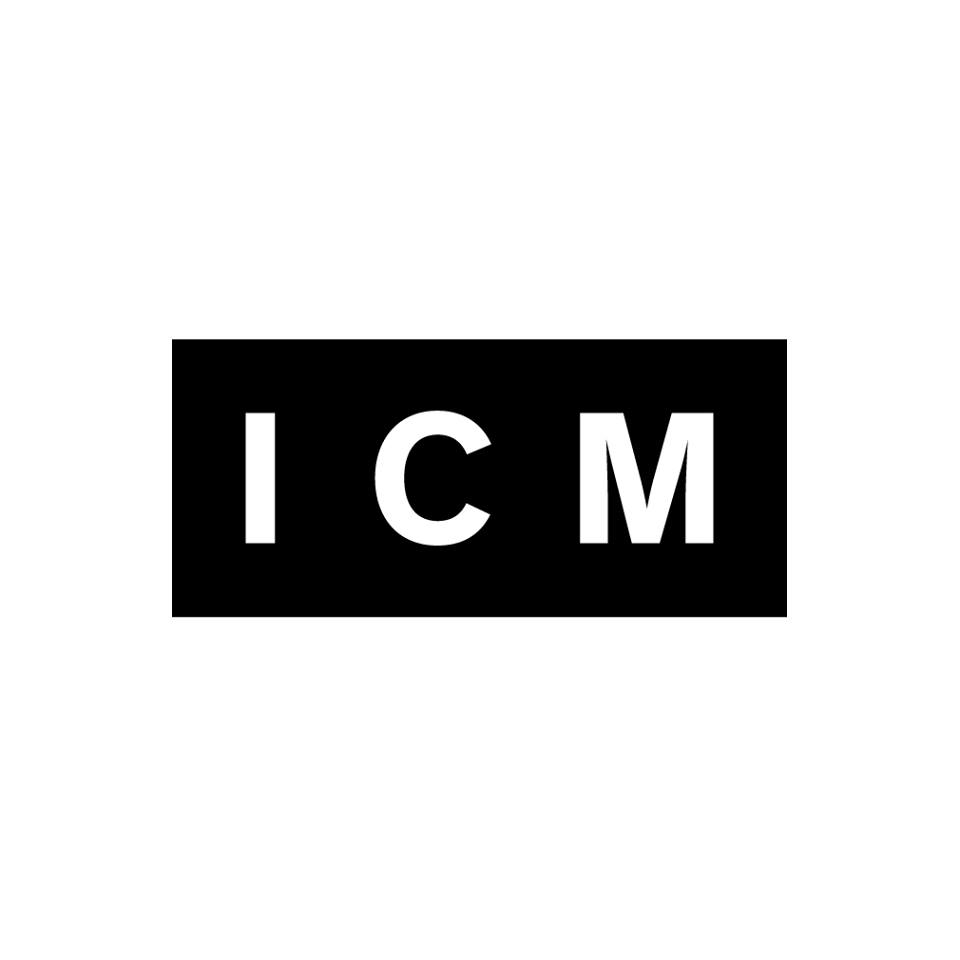
- Founded: 2013
- Founder: Angus Tarnawsky
- Genre: Electronic; Electro-acoustic; Experimental
- Location: New York City
- Official website: incontextmusic.com

In Context Music is an electro-acoustic music and electronic music record label established in 2013. Based in New York City, it is curated by Australian artist Angus Tarnawsky.

== Artists ==
- Shelley Burgon
- Brian Chase
- Che Chen
- James Conduit
- Daren Ho
- Nathan Liow
- monotope
- Helado Negro
- Angus Tarnawsky

== Catalogue ==
Title	Artist	Cat No	Year
LOVEHER	Shelley Burgon	ICM001	2013
Bus Passes By / Saturday (I Just Want To Go To Sleep)	Che Chen	ICM002	2013
Ride / Scratch	Brian Chase	ICM003	2013
Artifacts	Nathan Liow & Angus Tarnawsky	ICM004	2014
1 2 3 4 5 6	Daren Ho	ICM005	2014
Unsteady Scaffold / Voltaire's Dubs	monotope	ICM006	2014
Forthcoming	stroboyouth	ICM007	2017
Forthcoming	Joe Talia	ICM008	2017
LOVEHER Remixes	Shelley Burgon feat. James Conduit & Helado Negro	ICM009	2014
