= Las Vegas Weekly =

Free alternative weekly newspaper in Henderson, Nevada

- Type: Alternative weekly
- Owner: Greenspun Media Group
- Publisher: Mark De Pooter
- Editor: Spencer Patterson
- Founded: 1998
- Headquarters: 2275 Corporate Circle Drive; Third Floor; Henderson, NV 89074; United States
- Circulation: 42,000 (as of 2022)
- Website: lasvegasweekly.com

Las Vegas Weekly is a free alternative weekly newspaper based in Henderson, Nevada, covering Las Vegas arts, entertainment, culture and news. Las Vegas Weekly is published by Greenspun Media Group.

== History ==
The paper was founded in 1992 by James P. Reza, Greg Ryan and Robert Ringle as a free monthly publication called Scope Magazine covering Southern Nevada's culture, arts, music and lifestyle from a decidedly Generation X perspective.

Distributed freely throughout the greater Las Vegas area at bars, cafes, record stores, and other retail outlets, Scope published its first monthly issue in April 1992, featuring a familiar format of band interviews, news features, columns, a venue guide, and a 30-day calendar of music and arts events, presented in the New Journalism style and geared toward alternative culture. The 2021 documentary Parkway of Broken Dreams (directed by Pj Perez) highlights the rise and fall of that alternative culture in Las Vegas, including interviews with Reza and multiple Scope staffers. In its first year, Scope's primary competitors were the similar free newsprint tabloids In Music, and later in 1992, the first version of Las Vegas Weekly (published by Patrick Gaffey, and independent of the Las Vegas Weekly discussed here). Both In Music and Gaffey's version of Las Vegas Weekly ceased publication in 1993.

Anticipating the forthcoming decline of "alternative culture" and wishing to broaden the paper's reach and coverage, in 1996 Reza partnered with Daniel Greenspun, forming a new company (Radiant City Publications LLC) to publish Scope. During this partnership, Reza continued on as Managing Editor, expanding the paper's coverage to a more traditional alternative newsweekly style, and accelerating the publishing schedule to biweekly. In 1998, Reza sold his remaining interest in Scope to The Greenspun Corporation, who soon retooled it, increasing the frequency to weekly and renaming it Las Vegas Weekly.

As of December 2009, Las Vegas Weekly had a circulation of 65,000. In 2018, Greenspun merged sister publication The Sunday into Las Vegas Weekly. As of 2024, Senior Editor Geoff Carter is the sole staff member of the Las Vegas Weekly who also worked at Scope Magazine.
