= The Utopian =

Publication information
- Publisher: Pop! Goes the Icon
- Schedule: Quarterly
- Format: Limited series
- Publication date: (vol. 1); Summer 2009 - current
- Main character: James Douglas

Creative team
- Created by: Pj Perez

The Utopian is a webcomic and comic book created, written and drawn by Pj Perez. It is published by Pop! Goes the Icon.

== Synopsis ==
The Utopian tells the story of a high school senior, James Douglas, who adopts the anonymous identity of the "Utopian" in order to encourage young people to stand up for themselves. As the school's principal and other authorities attempt to determine the Utopian's identity, James tracks down corruption in the school and exposes a sordid scandal. Perez added a mystical side to the story, as James seems to die and be reborn with a spirit guide and unusual superpower.

== Publication history ==
The Utopian began running online on April 15, 2009, and was first collected in print in a limited-edition "number zero" issue, which was distributed at San Diego Comic-Con in 2009. The regular print comic book series began publishing in fall 2009, collecting material first shown online with new and unseen content. By August 2010, three regular issues had been published.

A trade paperback collecting the entire 109-page run of The Utopian was released in December 2010.

== Sequel ==
A sequel to The Utopian, a soap opera webcomic entitled The Utopian Foundation, is also written and drawn by Perez and published online.
