= So Much Love (The Rocket Summer song) =

Single by The Rocket Summer

from the album Do You Feel
- Released: July 17, 2007
- Recorded: 2007
- Genre: Power pop
- Length: 3:56
- Label: Island
- Songwriter(s): Bryce Avary

"So Much Love" is a song by rock artist The Rocket Summer. It was the lead single off his third studio album Do You Feel, released in 2007. The song charted in the Top 13 on R&R magazine's Christian Hit Radio chart as of December 15, 2007.

== Music video ==
The music video consisted of Bryce Avary singing and playing the piano, with a series of people climbing out of grand piano and onto the dance floor. The video later shows Avary switching back and forth between the piano and lead guitar, as he does in his live performances.
