= Josh Ostrander =

American singer-songwriter (born 1979)

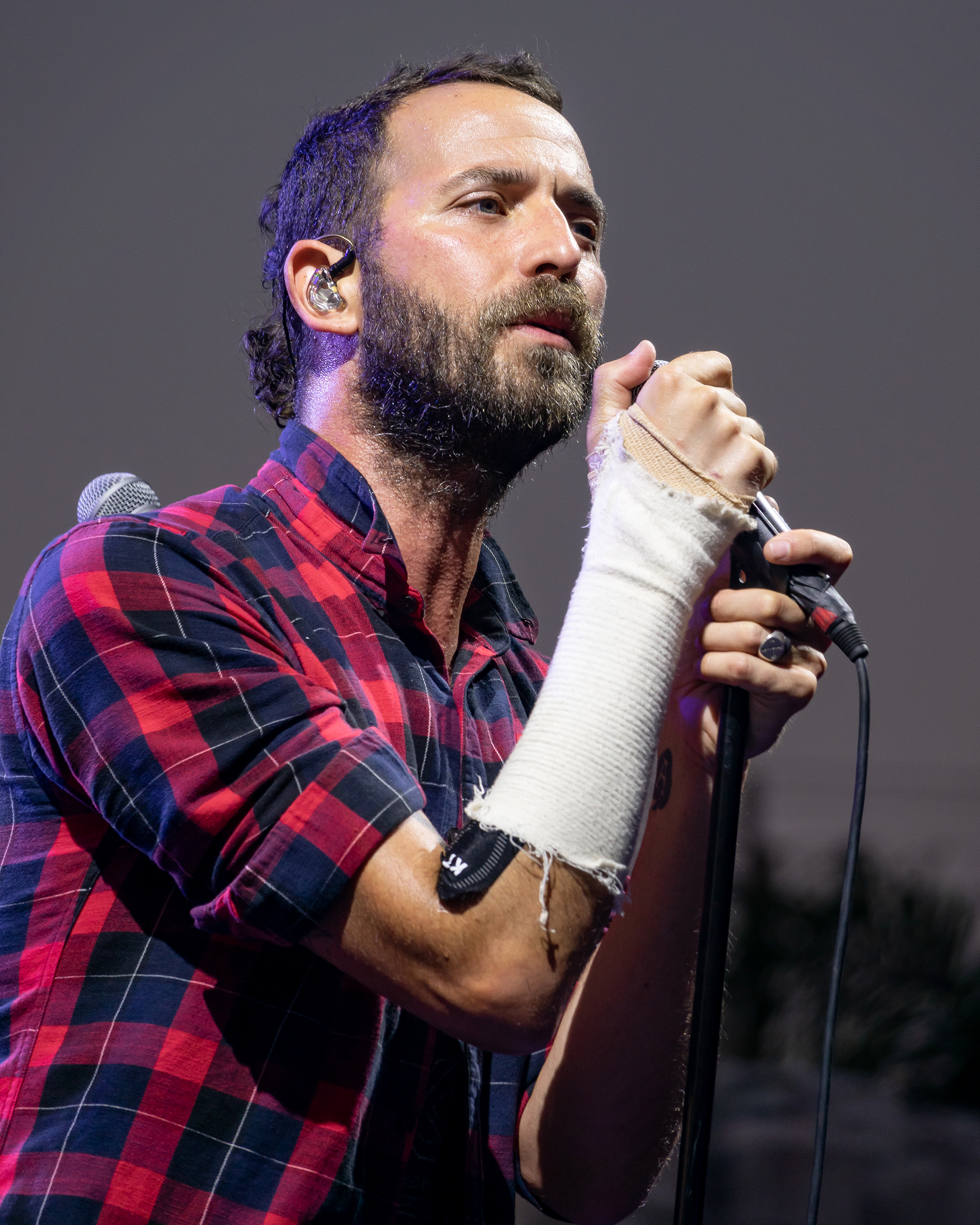
- Ostrander in 2016

Background information
- Also known as: Mondo Cozmo
- Born: Joshua Keith Ostrander; April 8, 1979 (age 47)
- Origin: Philadelphia, Pennsylvania, U.S.
- Genre: Folk rock
- Occupations: Singer; songwriter
- Instruments: Vocals; guitar; piano
- Years active: 2000–present
- Labels: Republic; Universal Republic; Universal
- Website: mondocozmo.com

Joshua Keith Ostrander (born April 8, 1979), also known as Mondo Cozmo, is an American singer-songwriter and record producer from Philadelphia, Pennsylvania. He is now based in Los Angeles, California. His solo music has been described as "chorus-heavy folk-rock."

== Biography and career ==
=== Laguardia (2000–2005) ===
Ostrander fronted the alt-rock band Laguardia from 2000 to 2005. It included Joshua Ostrander, Greg Lyons, Lee Bernstein and Michael Morpurgo and was signed to Universal Records and Republic Records released the album Welcome to the Middle in 2003 with "Holy Ghost" from the album released as a single. Ostrander's band, Laguardia, should not be confused with the famous Spanish Pop rock band La Guardia active 1983–1997 and relaunched in 2003.

=== Eastern Conference Champions (2005–2015) ===
Ostrander later became the front man of Eastern Conference Champions (ECC), which he started with his friend and collaborator Greg Lyons from Laguardia and Vern Zaborowski from CKY. The band also included Melissa Dougherty. The band came about when Ostrander and Lyons signed with Geffen Records and released the EP called The Southampton Collection under the ECC moniker. Three studio albums followed: Ameritown in 2007, Santa Fe in 2009 and SPEAK-AHH in 2010, and a number of EPs as Eastern Conference Champions. ECC disbanded in August 2015.

=== Other collaborations ===
Along with producing their own releases, Ostrander produced for such bands as Voxhaul Broadcast and worked on projects with such producers as Brendan O'Brien, Owen Morris, Brad Wood, Thom Panunzio, Jimmy Jam and Terry Lewis. Ostrander works out of his downtown LA studio called Santa Fe Studios.

=== Mondo Cozmo (2015–present) ===
Ostrander began recording under the name Mondo Cozmo in 2016, and his single "Shine" hit No. 1 on Billboard's Adult Alternative Songs chart in January 2017. His name comes from a combination of his dog's name, Cozmo, and the 1969 John Waters comedy "Mondo Trasho." His debut album "Plastic Soul" was released on August 4, 2017.

Ostrander's debut headlining tour as Mondo Cozmo began on July 12, 2017 at the Exit/In in Nashville, Tennessee. The tour ran nineteen shows and concluded on October 28, 2017. The touring band was composed of Drew "The Kid" Beck on electric guitar, Chris Null on acoustic guitar and bass, James Gordon on synth and keys, and Andrew Tolman on drums. Mondo Cozmo continues to tour and opened for Vance Joy in summer 2018.

== Discography ==
=== Albums ===
with Laguardia

- 2004: Welcome to the Middle, Universal Republic – Singer/Songwriter Co-Production

with Eastern Conference Champions

- 2005: The Southampton Collection, Geffen Records – Singer/Songwriter-Producer
- 2007: Ameritown, Interscope Records – Singer/Songwriter – Co-Production
- 2009: Santa Fe, RockHampton Records – Singer/Songwriter- Production
- 2010: Akustiks, RockHampton Records - Singer/Songwriter - Production
- 2010: SPEAK-AHH, RockHampton Records – Singer/Songwriter – Production
- 2015: Love in Wartime, RockHampton Records - Singer/Songwriter - Production

as Producer

- 2009: "Blaggers and Liars", KAV – 2009 – Producer/Engineer/Mixer
- 2009: "Fact, Fiction and Turquoise", Voxhaul Broadcast – Producer/Engineer/Mixer
- 2009: "Mios", Corband – Producer/Engineer/Mixer
- 2009: "Untitled", Two Years Before The Mast – Producer/Engineer/Mixer
- 2009: "Lay Alone" single, The Brothers Movement – Mixer
- 2010: "Untitled", KAV – 2010 – Producer/Engineer/Mixer
- 2017: "Plastic Soul", Republic Records - Producer
- 2020: “New Medicine”, Last Gang Records - Executive Producer
- 2022: "This Is For The Barbarians", Last Gang Records - Executive Producer
- 2024: "It's PRINCIPLE!", Last Gang Records - Executive producer

=== Singles ===
as Mondo Cozmo

Title	Year	Peak chart positions						Album
Title	Year	US AAA	US Alt.	US Rock	AUS Digi.	CAN Rock	UK Sales	Album
"Hold On to Me"	2016	—	—	—	—	—	—	Plastic Soul
"Shine"	2016	1	17	40	35	31	87	Plastic Soul
"Automatic"	2017	13	—	— (Note: "Automatic" did not enter the Hot Rock & Alternative Songs chart, but peaked at number 49 on the Rock & Alternative Airplay chart.)	—	49	—	Plastic Soul
"Plastic Soul"	2017	29	—	—	—	—	—	Plastic Soul
"Tonight Tonight"	2018	28	—	—	—	—	—	Your Motherfucker EP
"Black Cadillac"	2019	—	—	—	—	—	—	New Medicine
"Come On"	2019	—	—	—	—	—	—	New Medicine
"Generator"	2019	—	—	—	—	—	—	New Medicine
"Upside Down"	2020	31	—	—	—	—	—	New Medicine
"Feel Good"	2021	—	—	—	—	—	—	This Is for the Barbarians
"Meant for Livin'"	2022	—	—	—	—	—	—	This Is for the Barbarians
"Electrify My Love"	2022	—	—	—	—	—	—	This Is for the Barbarians
"Wild Horses"	2024	—	—	—	—	—	—	It's PRINCIPLE!
"Sweet Forever"	2026	—	—	—	—	—	96	Sweet Forever
"—" denotes a single that did not chart or was not released in that territory.
