= Calendar Days =

Studio album by The Rocket Summer
- Released: February 8, 2003
- Recorded: July–August 2002 at: Red House Recording (Eudora, KS, United States)
- Genre: Alternative rock
- Length: 38:46 (United States/UK); 43:06 (JP)
- Label: The Militia Group
- Producer: Bryce Avary

The Rocket Summer chronology
The Rocket Summer (EP) (2000)	Calendar Days (2003)	Hello, Good Friend (2005)

Professional ratings
Review scores
Source	Rating
AllMusic	4/5 stars

Calendar Days is The Rocket Summer's first full-length album, released in 2003. In Japan, this album included a bonus track titled "She's a Seven" which was later released in the US on The Early Years EP. The album title comes from the track "TV Family".

== Track listing ==
No.	Title	Writer(s)	Length
1.	"Cross My Heart"	Bryce Avary	4:48
2.	"Skies So Blue"	Bryce Avary	4:42
3.	"This Is Me"	Bryce Avary	3:47
4.	"Saturday"	Bryce Avary	2:32
5.	"She's My Baby"	Bryce Avary	3:55
6.	"That's So You"	Bryce Avary	3:01
7.	"Mean Thoughts and Cheap Shots"	Bryce Avary	3:46
8.	"Movie Stars and Super Models"	Bryce Avary	3:32
9.	"What We Hate, We Make"	Bryce Avary	4:34
10.	"TV Family"	Bryce Avary	4:13

Japanese bonus track
No.	Title	Writer(s)	Length
11.	"She's a Seven"	Bryce Avary	4:20

== Personnel ==
The Rocket Summer

- Bryce Avary – vocals, guitar, bass, drums, piano, keyboard, production

Additional personnel

- Duane Deering – mixing
- Darrell LaCour – mixing
- Gavin Lurssen – mastering
- Adrian Hulet – backing vocals on tracks 1 and 5
- The 02-03 Colleyville Middle School 6th Grade Concert Girls' Choir – vocals on track 9
