= Hello, Good Friend =

Studio album by The Rocket Summer
- Released: May 17, 2005
- Recorded: 2004
- Genre: Rock, power pop
- Length: 55:23
- Label: The Militia Group
- Producer: Bryce Avary and Tim O'Heir

The Rocket Summer chronology
Calendar Days (2003)	Hello, Good Friend (2005)	The Early Years EP (2006)

Professional ratings
Review scores
Source	Rating
Allmusic	3.5/5 stars

Hello, Good Friend is The Rocket Summer's second full-length album, released in 2005. It reached #26 on the Top Heatseekers Chart. The title of the album is from the track "Never Knew".

== Track listing ==
1. Move to the Other Side of the Block (1:28)
2. I Was So Alone (2:35)
3. Around The Clock (3:59)
4. I'm Doing Everything (For You) (4:27)
5. Tell Me Something Good (3:52)
6. Never Knew (4:17)
7. Brat Pack (3:47)
8. Treasures (2:09)
9. Story (4:16)
10. Goodbye Waves and Driveways (5:05)
11. Show Me Everything You've Got (4:46)
12. Destiny (3:51)
13. Christmas Present/Good News (Hidden Track) (11:46)

== Charts ==
Chart (2012)	Peak position
US Heatseekers Albums (Billboard)	26
US Independent Albums (Billboard)	26
