= Pop! Goes the Icon =

- Industry: Comics
- Founded: 2009
- Founder: Pj Perez
- Headquarters: Las Vegas, Nevada
- Key people: Pj Perez, publisher/editor-in-chief
- Website: PopGoesTheIcon.com

Pop! Goes the Icon or PGTI, is an independent American comic book publisher based in Las Vegas, Nevada.

== Company history ==
Pop! Goes the Icon started as a blog by Las Vegas-based writer Pj Perez in 2007, whose topics included comic books and popular culture. After turning over the day-to-day updating of the blog to fellow Las Vegas writer Jarret Keene, Perez worked in secret to revamp PGTI as a boutique publisher of comic books, webcomics and other works of pop culture.

The blog was relaunched as the new PGTI website in April, 2009, announcing a forthcoming webcomic by Perez called The Utopian.

The first print comic published by PGTI was The Utopian #0, a limited-edition (only 50 copies were produced) sampler comic distributed for free at the 2009 San Diego Comic-Con, which collected the first 16 pages from the Utopian webcomic. The regular print series of The Utopian began in the fall of 2009 and continues to publish quarterly, presenting collections of the web series alongside previously unpublished material.

PGTI launched its second title, Omega Comics Presents, an anthology series modeled after precursors such as the similarly named Dark Horse Presents, in February 2010. Published quarterly, it features multiple short, standalone and episodic stories each issue from underexposed creators of independent comics.

In 2014, PGTI began publishing San Hannibal, a ″pulp crime comic″ written by Dan Schkade. The five-issue series was named ″book of the year″ by comic book blog Comic Bastards. It was collected into a paperback volume called San Hannibal: The City of Love and Fear.

== Titles ==
- The Utopian (2009–present)
- Omega Comics Presents (2010–present)
- Tales From The Boneyard (November 2010)
- Tales From Fremont Street (November 2011)
- Tales From Lost Vegas (November 2013)
- San Hannibal (April 2014-January 2015)
- Old Wounds (April 2015 – present)
