= Comfort (Splashh album) =

Studio album by Splashh
- Released: 4 June 2013
- Recorded: February – July 2012 in Stevens Avenue and 1234 Studios; London, United Kingdom
- Genre: Psychedelic rock, shoegazing, indie rock
- Length: 33:00
- Label: Luv Luv Luv, Kanine Records
- Producer: Toto Vivian

Splashh chronology
Comfort (2013)	Waiting a Lifetime (2017)

Singles from Comfort
- 1. "Need It" Released: 13 July 2012; 2. "Vacation" Released: 5 November 2012; 3. "All I Wanna Do" Released: 24 May 2013; 4. "Feels Like You" Released: 5 July 2013

Comfort is the debut studio album by British band Splashh, first released on 4 June 2013 in the US on Kanine Records, then on 2 September 2013 through Luv Luv Luv Records in the UK. It was released as a digital download, Digipak CD and on transparent blue vinyl. A limited-edition version was released on transparent blue vinyl with a bonus 10-inch EP, in which some copies were signed.

The first single to be released from the album was "Need It", released in July 2012. The second single was "Vacation" released in November 2012, which was followed by "All I Wanna Do" in May 2013, and then "Feels Like You" in July 2013.

== Track listing ==
All tracks are written by Sasha Carlson and Toto Vivian.

No.	Title	Length
1.	"Headspins"	3:07
2.	"All I Wanna Do"	3:38
3.	"Need It"	3:02
4.	"Vacation"	2:56
5.	"So Young"	2:41
6.	"Lemonade"	2:56
7.	"Feels Like You"	3:02
8.	"Green & Blue"	4:29
9.	"Strange Fruit"	3:06
10.	"Lost Your Cool"	4:03

Bonus 10"
No.	Title	Length
1.	"Washed Up"	3:09
2.	"Re-hash"	3:38
3.	"Sun Kissed Bliss"	3:52
4.	"Something's Here"	2:53

== Release history ==
Region	Date	Label
Brazil/South America	20 September 2013	Balaclava Records
United States	4 June 2013	Kanine Records
Australia	7 June 2013	Breakaway Records
United Kingdom	2 September 2013	Luv Luv Luv
