= Pj Perez =

American musician and writer (born 1976)

- Born: August 4, 1976 (age 50)
- Occupations: Writer, Filmmaker
- Writing career
- Genres: non-fiction, commentary, comic books
- Notable works: The Utopian, Parkway of Broken Dreams
- Website: www.pjperez.com

Pj Perez (born August 4, 1976) is an American editor, writer, musician and filmmaker, best known for his reports and commentary on Las Vegas culture in such publications as Rolling Stone. Perez was the founding managing editor of Las Vegas-based Racket Magazine.

== Writing ==
Perez made his first forays into publishing with self-published 'zines and poetry chapbooks in the early and mid-1990s while performing on the Las Vegas poetry circuit and singing in short-lived bands before beginning his freelance writing career with Las Vegas CityLife in 2000. After writing for a number of local and regional publications including Las Vegas Weekly and Las Vegas Mercury, Perez was recruited in late 2006 to launch a monthly lifestyle magazine called Racket. After Racket went on indefinite hiatus, Perez returned to freelance journalism, writing for publications such as Six Degrees and HRH magazines. He was previously the Las Vegas Fine Arts Examiner for Examiner.com.

== Comics ==
In April 2009, Perez re-launched his comic book and pop culture website, Pop! Goes the Icon, as a boutique publishing label, and began writing and illustrating a weekly webcomic, The Utopian. The Utopian was collected in a trade paperback released in 2011, and a sequel collection called The Utopian Foundation followed in 2018.

== Music ==
In the late 1990s, Perez played guitar in Morgana Athena, a Las Vegas-based gothic rock band whose single "E.S.P." was featured on Dim View of the Future, a gothic rock compilation released by a subsidiary of Triple X Records. He previously played drums and guitar in Las Vegas-based rock band As Yet Unbroken, and most recently, played bass guitar in Vegas-based indie rock band MOONBOOTS, which released a self-titled extended play record in 2016. Moonboots broke up later that year.

== Filmmaking ==
Perez first ventured into filmmaking with the 2011 48 Hour Film Project short film Sugarhook. In August 2018, he posted a teaser trailer for Parkway of Broken Dreams, a documentary film about the cultural scene that developed near the University of Nevada, Las Vegas in the early 1990s. Parkway of Broken Dreams premiered in Las Vegas on October 13, 2021. It won the Audience Award for Best Documentary at the 2021 Silver State Film Festival.

In 2020, Perez released a television pilot for a proposed series called Notepads & Bar Tabs, developed with screenwriter Matthew Sorvillo.

Perez is currently in production on a documentary film about the 1998 murders of anti-racist skinheads Lin Newborn and Daniel Shersty tentatively titled Murdered on the Fourth of July. A crowdfunding campaign to support production of the film was launched in October 2023, raising $11,100 from 92 backers.

== Education ==
Perez graduated from the University of Nevada, Las Vegas with a dual bachelor's degree in journalism and sociology. While at UNLV, he temporarily served as editor in chief of The Rebel Yell, the campus' award-winning newspaper.
