= As Yet Unbroken =

American alternative rock band

- Origin: Las Vegas, Nevada, U.S.
- Genres: Alternative rock
- Years active: 2007-present
- Labels: None
- Members: Tim Beck; Mark T. Zeilman; Jackie Pope; Pj Perez
- Past members: Richard Espe; Peter Stauber
- Website: www.asyetunbroken.com

As Yet Unbroken is an American alternative rock band from Las Vegas, Nevada. Formed in late 2007, the current members of the band are Tim Beck (vocals), Mark T. Zeilman (bass), Pj Perez (guitar) and Jackie Pope (drums). The band describes its sound as "bridging punk rock energy with addictive melodies and aggressive rhythms."

== Band history ==
After going through a string of guitarists, the band made its public debut at a battle of the bands competition in Las Vegas in 2008. As Yet Unbroken won the first round and went on to finish second in the regional semi-finals.

Since then, the band has self-released a three-song EP, from which the title song, "Alone," has been played on radio stations such as Las Vegas' Area 107.9-FM. As Yet Unbroken's songs have also been the top downloaded MP3s numerous times at the Las Vegas Weekly's website. Guitarist Peter Stauber joined the group in early 2010. Currently, Perez has switched from drums to guitar and Jackie Pope has taken over on drums.

== Discography ==
Studio albums

- Unknown (2012)
