= The Abyss (band) =

American rock band

- Origin: Houston, Texas, U.S.
- Genres: Alternative rock, post-punk, gothic rock, darkwave
- Years active: 2007–present
- Label: Unsigned
- Members: Sean Ozz
- Website: theabyssband.com

The Abyss is an American alternative rock band based out of Houston, Texas, that was founded in 2007 by Sean Ozz and Ronnie Kopal.

== Musical development ==
The band has appeared in performances with PiL (Public Image Limited), ORGY, Boys Don't Cry, The Razorblade Dolls, and The Scars Heal in Time. They have appeared at multiple performances for the Houston Zombie Walk and The Houston Press Music Awards.

== Awards and recognitions ==
The Abyss was nominated for Best Modern Rock Band at the 2013 Houston Press Music Awards, for Best Modern Rock Band at the 2012 Houston Press Music Awards, and for Best Modern Rock Band at the 2011 Houston Press Music Awards.

== Band members ==
=== Current ===
- Sean Ozz — lead vocals, guitar, and founding member of The Abyss. He also played keyboards/synth on the band's earlier releases (2007–2013). Former frontman and bassist for Stranger Than Fiction, Ozz has been writing and performing his arts for over 25 years. He is also an award-winning visual artist and a renowned freelance tattooist. He also paints and airbrushes everything from canvas to guitars. Ozz's musical influences include Jane's Addiction, The Cure, Joy Division, and Radiohead. Ozz takes a lot of his influence from the visual arts and incorporates this into the songwriting and vocal performance within The Abyss.

=== Former ===
Paul Cannon — drums, percussion, and songwriter (2010–2012) Paul was a driving member along with Sean and Ronnie. He departed the music scene to focus on his family and law practice in 2012.

- Tray Chester — drums, a former member of Stranger Than Fiction where he had first begun performing with Sean Ozz, prior to joining The Abyss during the band's forming years. Chester was unable to continue performing with the band for medical reasons.
- Ronnie Kopal — bass guitar, lead guitar, rhythm guitar, songwriter, and co-founder. (2007–2012). Kopal founded The Abyss with Sean Ozz in 2007 and was a co-songwriter until he left in 2012 to focus on his family. Since then Ronnie has joined on occasion for live shows.
- David Swetnam — drums. (2010)Dave jumped in to continue in Chester's footsteps and was with the band until he joined the police academy in 2010.
- Bill Curtner — Lead guitar, (2009, 2013) Bill has worked on and off with The Abyss since he met Sean. He was unable to continue due to family commitments and time restraints in 2013.
- Brent Lee — bass guitar, (2012); Brent contributed to the writing of one unreleased track before his departure in May 2013. He has since appeared at occasional live performances with the band.
- Chad Pleasant — drums, (2013–2014) With The Abyss doing fewer live shows through late 2014 and early 2015 Chad has taken this time to work on side projects. He appears at live performances occasionally with the band.

== Discography ==
- It's About Time (2011, US) Limited edition, five-track EP
- Liquid/Screams for Help (2012, US) Dual, single EP
