= Ameritown =

Studio album by Eastern Conference Champions
- Released: July 17, 2007
- Genre: Indie rock
- Label: Suretone Records
- Producer: Ian Cross, Owen Morris, Thom Panunzio

Eastern Conference Champions chronology
The Southampton Collection (EP) (2006)	Ameritown (2007)	Santa Fe (EP) (2009)

Professional ratings
Review scores
Source	Rating
Allmusic	3.5/5 stars

Ameritown is the debut album by indie rock band Eastern Conference Champions. It was released on July 17, 2007 through Suretone Records, an imprint of Geffen Records.

== Track listing ==
1. The Box – 4:12
2. Noah – 3:33
3. Some Sorta Light – 4:12
4. Stutter – 3:12
5. Single Sedative – 2:45
6. Yuppy Hipster Fuck – 5:02
7. To the Wind – 2:50
8. Pitch a Fit – 3:05
9. Gucci No. 3 – 3:10
10. Nice Clean Shirt – 2:59
11. Rabbit Hole – 5:04
12. Hollywood.... – 9:08
