= Zoetic =

Studio album by The Rocket Summer
- Released: February 26, 2016
- Recorded: Los Angeles, California
- Genre: Alternative rock, indie rock, pop rock
- Length: 40:44
- Label: Aviate
- Producer: Bryce Avary

The Rocket Summer chronology
Life Will Write the Words (2012)	Zoetic (2016)	Sweet Shivers (2019)

Zoetic is the sixth studio album by The Rocket Summer. Aviate Records released the album on February 26, 2016.

== Background ==
Avary made the album in Los Angeles, California, where he did all the work on this album by himself, while he wrote 50 songs for the album, eventually whittling it down to the eleven tracks on the record. The word "Zoetic" is an adjective meaning alive or living.

== Critical reception ==
Professional ratings
Review scores
Source	Rating
Alternative Press	4.5/5 stars
New Release Today	4.5/5 stars
New Noise Magazine	4.5/5 stars
Substream Magazine	4/5 stars

Awarding the album four and a half stars at Alternative Press, Alyson Stokes wrote, "The Rocket Summer's first full-length album in nearly four years proves true to its namesake by roaring to life with unyielding passion, authenticity and a whole lot of guitars...Zoetic is not an average everyday 'love' album; it's a 'life' album that evokes a sense of urgency not only to live but to live inspired." Jessica Klinner, giving the album four stars from Substream Magazine, states, "Even with the second run through, it takes concentration to warm up to the songs and grasp what Avary has built—a powerful collection of songs that surpasses all of his previous releases in power and musical finesse." Putting a four and a half star rating upon the album by New Noise Magazine, Nicholas Senior describes, "It’s an album that feels true to what The Rocket Summer have always done, yet it shows off a wonderful sense of sonic daring and zeal."

New Noise Magazine wrote, "This is undoubtedly The Rocket Summer's best release, and it's an album that no one expected." HM Magazine states "The intimacy of his performances is impossible to shake, and with a new record that will no doubt be labeled his boldest, Zoetic's bravery will go down in history." Paste Magazine wrote "The Rocket Summer's new album Zoetic proves Bryce a master at creating catchy, upbeat anthems."

Mary Nikkel, rating the album four and a half stars for New Release Today, said, "Fiercely alive, comfortable in its own skin and effortlessly embodying the best of the alt rock ethos, The Rocket Summer's Zoetic promises to hold up to countless repeat plays."

== Track listing ==
All tracks are written by Bryce Avary.

No.	Title	Length
1.	"Cold War"	2:59
2.	"Same Air"	3:58
3.	"UNI"	3:19
4.	"Help Me Out"	2:44
5.	"Get Over It"	4:09
6.	"White Fireworks"	3:29
7.	"You Are, You Are"	4:24
8.	"FL, CA"	3:49
9.	"Rule of Thirds Kind of Life"	3:22
10.	"Sharks"	4:16
11.	"Emergency Landings"	4:15
Total length:		40:44

== Chart performance ==
Chart (2016)	Peak position
US Top Alternative Albums (Billboard)	20
US Independent Albums (Billboard)	17
US Top Rock Albums (Billboard)	31
