= Eastern Conference Champions =

- Origin: Philadelphia, Pennsylvania, United States
- Genre: Indie rock
- Years active: 2005-2015
- Labels: Suretone Records, MapleMusic Recordings (Canada), RockHampton Records
- Past members: Joshua Ostrander; Greg Lyons; Melissa Dougherty; Vern Zaborowski
- Website: www.easternconferencechampions.com www.eccforums.com

Eastern Conference Champions (often abbreviated ECC) was an American Indie rock band originally from Philadelphia and later residing in Los Angeles, CA, they consisted of Joshua Ostrander, Greg Lyons, and Melissa Dougherty. The band gained attention when it was announced that they would be featured on the Twilight Saga: Eclipse soundtrack in May, 2010.

== Band history ==
Eastern Conference Champions (also known as ECC) was formed by Joshua Ostrander and Greg Lyons in 2005, shortly after leaving the rock band Laguardia. They released The Southampton Collection EP on Retone Records in March 2006.

In late 2006 the band was signed to Geffen/Suretone Records, a subsidiary of Geffen Records.

The band worked with British producer Owen Morris, on recording their first full-length album Ameritown, which was released on July 17, 2007. The release was a critical success but the band felt out of place at the major label and decided to opt out of their contract for the second record. Taking the exit fee and putting it towards self-releasing their own records under their imprint "RockHampton". A name Greg Lyons came up citing the town he and Josh grew up in, Southampton, PA.

They were featured as the musical guests on Last Call with Carson Daly on August 9, 2007. They released a behind the scenes video, chronicling their performance, which can be found on their Myspace.

Melissa Dougherty joined the band in 2009 after the departure of founding bassist, former CKY bassist Vern Zaborowski. Ostrander, Lyons and Dougherty recorded The Santa Fe EP, which they self-released on September 30. The band sold limited edition signed artwork copies off of their website. The EP gained more exposure when it landed TV placements for 'Friday Night Lights' and 'Melrose Place'. Both shows featuring 'Sideways Walking', a song Ostrander says is about trying to quit smoking. The band was also featured on the season finale of Gossip Girl on May 17, 2010 with their rendition of Bob Dylan's 'Don't Think Twice, It's All Right'. The song quickly became the band's number one seller on iTunes.

Based on the success of the Santa Fe EP the band decided to release another EP in early 2010, but then decided to record a full length once they realized they were going to be on the upcoming Twilight Eclipse soundtrack. The album, entitled Speak-ahh, was to be released on April 26 via RockHampton Records. It was said to be the biggest departure to date from the band's already unique sound. In an interview with Ostrander he stated the first single, "Bull in The Wild" was without a doubt the "biggest song of their career."

The band was thinking of shortening their name to just 'ECC' in the Spring of 2010 until realizing they forgot to tell the producers of Twilight who then shipped the record with the full name. The band has made reference to the reason they never gained great success was because their "name was too long" and that nobody wanted to type it and jokingly that "we came up with the name before the internet took off."

The band prided themselves on being a 'one stop shop' for anything band related. They record, produce, mix and master their own records and Ostrander designs all artwork and posters. He has made reference to being an "un-qualified hack at everything" and that he "should have been a lawyer."

On August 24, 2015, Josh Ostrander announced that Eastern Conference Champions was disbanding following their release "Love in Wartime" on iTunes.

== Discography ==
=== Albums ===
- Ameritown (2007)
- Akustiks (2010)
- SPEAK-AHH (2011)
- Love in Wartime (2015)

=== EPs ===
- The Southampton Collection EP (2006)
- Home Away EP (2007) Vinyl 7'
- Santa Fe EP (2009)

=== Soundtracks ===
- The Twilight Saga: Eclipse (soundtrack) (2010)
