= Parkway of Broken Dreams =

2021 American documentary film

- Directed by: Pj Perez
- Produced by: Pj Perez
- Edited by: Pj Perez
- Production company: PKWY Media
- Distributed by: Filmhub, National Educational Telecommunications Association
- Release date: October 13, 2021
- Running time: 79 min.
- Language: English

Parkway of Broken Dreams is a 2021 documentary film produced and directed by filmmaker Pj Perez. The documentary follows the rise and fall of the independent art and music scene that developed near the University of Nevada, Las Vegas in the 1990s.

The world premiere of the film was held at Galaxy Theatres in Las Vegas in October 2021. It was distributed to American public television stations in 2022 by the National Educational Telecommunications Association. The film also won the Audience Award for Best Documentary at the 2021 Silver State Film Festival in Las Vegas and a "Ten Degrees Hotter" Award at the 2021 Valley Film Festival for Feature Documentary. The film was also distributed to various video on demand and streaming services, including iTunes Store and Xumo.

== Synopsis ==
In the late 1980s and early 1990s, a poetry, arts, and music scene develops near UNLV along Maryland Parkway, a major thoroughfare on the eastside of Las Vegas, centered around the coffeehouses, record stores, and bars that typify the college area.

As the 1990s come to a close, a variety of factors leads to the decline of the culture in that area, including the closing of several businesses, a change in format for college radio station KUNV, and the emergence of 18b The Las Vegas Arts District in Downtown Las Vegas.
