= 8 Legged Monster =

American jazz band

The 8 Legged Monster was an American jazz band, active from 2007 until 2015, and based in San Francisco, California. They wrote, played, and arranges music in various jazz, bebop, free jazz and big band genres. The band's founder, leader and guitarist Mike Irwin Johnson writes/arranges all the music.

== History ==
Mike Irwin Johnson grew up in Walnut Creek, California. He began playing guitar in High School after receiving a guitar from his father. Johnson moved to San Francisco and studied jazz composition at San Francisco State University in 1999.

Johnson started 8 Legged Monster in 2007 to showcase the talent of some of the local musicians in San Francisco and to bring a more compositional approach to the San Francisco Bay Area music scene.

== Members and collaborators ==
The 8 Legged Monster's most recent lineup includes Jaz Sawyer, Rob Barics, Mike Olmos, Joe Cohen, Matt Nelson, Fil Lorenz, Danny Grewn, Eric Markowitz & Karina Deniké.

8 Legged Monster is worked with Pursuance Records, an independent record label founded by drummer Jaz Sawyer.

== Sound ==
The groups' sound has been compared to Birth of the Cool and Sun Ra. A writer recently stated that the group was an "evolution to a higher form of swing". Other writers have compared the band's approach to Duke Ellington in that the writing is a direct result of the members intended to play the music.

== Notable shows and works ==
On September 3, 2009, the 8 Legged Monster released their CD "Vol. 2"CD release concert at Yoshi's in San Francisco, California. And on January 14, 2010 Johnson put together various works of Sun Ra for the SF Jazz organization's tribute series entitled "SF Jazz Hotplate". A small excerpt of the performance and interview with Johnson is posted on the band's website.
