= You Gotta Believe (EP) =

EP by The Rocket Summer
- Released: October 26, 2009
- Recorded: 2009
- Genre: Alternative rock
- Label: Island

The Rocket Summer chronology
| Do You Feel (2007) | You Gotta Believe (2009) | Of Men and Angels (2010) |

You Gotta Believe is a four-track EP by The Rocket Summer that was announced on October 8, 2009 to be released on October 27, 2009. It was officially released on iTunes a day early on Oct. 26, 2009. The EP features three tracks off the upcoming record Of Men and Angels and one bonus track. Upon its release, the EP peaked at #1 on iTunes' top 10 alternative albums and #5 overall.

== Critical reception ==
You Gotta Believe received reviews, with Scott Heisel of Alt Press describing the EP as "packed with soulful vocals, easily digestible choruses and inspirational, occasionally spiritual lyrics" whose only downside is that its four songs leave little room for variation or experimentation.

== Track listing ==
All tracks are written by Bryce Avary.

| No. | Title | Length |
|---|---|---|
| 1. | "You Gotta Believe" | 3:16 |
| 2. | "Hills & Valleys" | 3:49 |
| 3. | "Light" | 4:02 |
| 4. | "The Fight" (Bonus Track) | 3:14 |

== Charts ==
| Chart (2012) | Peak position |
|---|---|
| US Billboard 200 | 114 |
| US Digital Albums (Billboard) | 23 |
| US Top Rock Albums (Billboard) | 49 |
