= Alphabet Rockers =

American children's music group

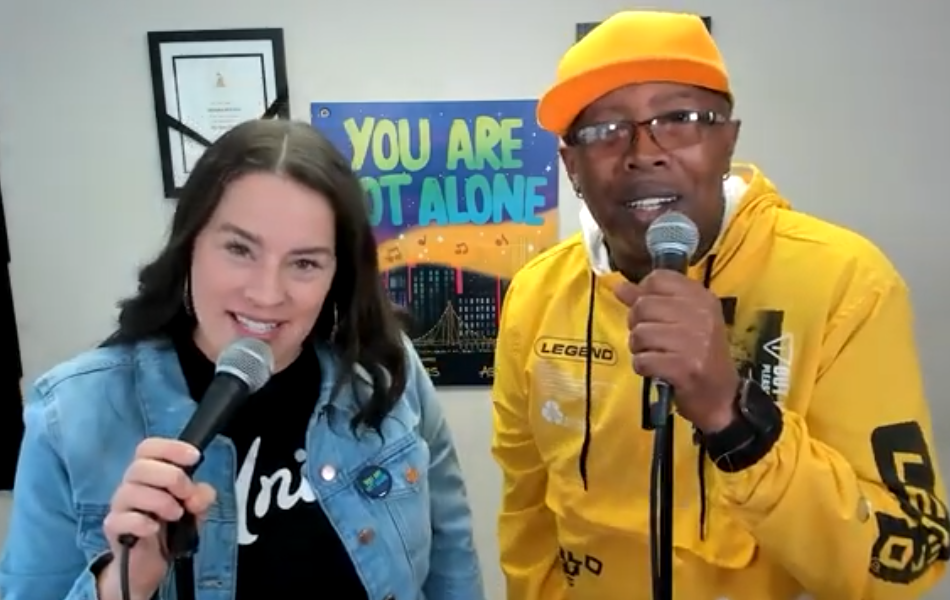
- In a San Francisco Public Library video in 2022

Background information
- Origin: Oakland, California, United States
- Genres: Children's music, Hip-hop
- Years active: 2007–present
- Label: School Time Music
- Members: Kaitlin McGaw; Tommy Soulati Shepherd various guests
- Website: aphabetrockers.com

Alphabet Rockers is a hip-hop children's music group focused on diversity, equity, inclusion, and advocacy. The Movement won a Grammy Award for Best Children's Music Album. Previous albums The Love (2020) and Rise Shine #Woke (2018) also received Grammy nominations. The music group has performed at the Kennedy Center, Smithsonian National Museum of African American History and Culture, Lollapalooza, and San Francisco Pride, among other venues.

== History ==
Alphabet Rockers were founded in 2007 by Kaitlin McGaw and Tommy Soulati Shepherd. The primary group features McGaw and Shepherd along with Maya Fleming, Kali de Jesus, Tommy Shepherd III, Samara Atkins, and Roza Do. The artists collaborate with people of all ages and backgrounds who write, produce and record songs that address racism, sexism, homophobia, xenophobia, and transphobia. Their album The Movement won a Grammy Award for Best Children's Album in 2023, and they have won two Parents' Choice Awards. The group has performed at the Smithsonian National Museum of African American History and Culture, the Perelman Performing Arts Center, and the Oakland Museum of California.

In 2018, their album Rise Shine #Woke was nominated for a Grammy award for Best Children's Album, and in 2020 they received a Grammy nomination in the same category for their album The Love.

In 2020, Alphabet Rockers created "We Got Work to Do", an anti-racism curriculum that uses music and dance as tools which was featured on CBS This Morning and YouTube Kids. In 2021, they were featured on the Grammy nominated album All One Tribe (with 1 Tribe Collective). In 2022, Alphabet Rockers released the book You Are Not Alone, (illustrated by Ashley Evans), which includes six diverse characters taking turns sharing their experiences of prejudice, identity struggles, and their desire to be seen, understood, and respected. Kirkus Reviews called it, "Exuberantly affirming and infectiously joyful."

In 2024, Alphabet Rockers were featured on Fabulous Show with Fay and Fluffy's season two's episode "I Love Peace", and their original song "Whynot A Christmas Carol" was featured in the American Conservatory Theater's holiday musical A Whynot Christmas Carol.

=== Founders ===
Kaitlin McGaw began writing poetry, singing, and became involved with musical theater in high school. She cites influences as Nikki Giovanni and Maya Angelou. After graduating from Harvard University with a Bachelor of Arts Degree in Afro-American Studies, she moved to the San Francisco Bay Area. McGaw then started performing in a hip-hop dance troupe, acting in musical theater, and pursued singing and songwriting full-time.

Tommy Soulati Shepherd is an actor, playwright, composer, educator, rapper, drummer, beatboxer and music producer. In 2018, he won an Isadora Duncan Dance Award for his work with Marc Bamuthi Joseph on "peh-LO-tah", Living Word Project, at the YBCA Theater in San Francisco, CA. In 2021, he and his son won a National Parenting Product Award for the collaborative album 28 Days. Shepherd and his son Tommy Shepherd III are the second parent/child team to win a Grammy Award, with the first being Beyonce and her daughter, Blue Ivy Carter.

=== Discography ===
- 2012 – Back to School: The Remix
- 2012 – Go!
- 2016 – The Playground Zone (EP)
- 2017 – Rise Shine #Woke
- 2019 – The Love
- 2021 – All One Tribe (with 1 Tribe Collective)
- 2022 – The Movement
- 2024 – Eclipse the Musical (EP)

== Awards ==
Year	Nominated work	Category	Award	Result
2023	The Movement	Best Children's Album	Grammy Award	Won
2020	The Love	Best Children's Album	Grammy Award	Nominated
2020	The Love	Notable Children's Recordings	American Library Association	Won
2019	The Love	Gold Award	Parents' Choice Award	Won
2018	Rise Shine #Woke	Best Children's Album	Grammy Award	Nominated
2018	Rise Shine #Woke	Silver Honor	Parents' Choice Music Award	Won
2017	The Playground Zone	Notable Children's Recordings	American Library Association	Won
