= Life Will Write the Words =

Studio album by the Rocket Summer
- Released: June 5, 2012
- Genres: Pop rock, power Pop
- Length: 45:43
- Label: Aviate Records
- Producer: Bryce Avary

The Rocket Summer chronology
| Of Men and Angels (2010) | Life Will Write the Words (2012) | Zoetic (2016) |

Life Will Write the Words is the fifth full-length studio album by American pop rock artist the Rocket Summer, which was released on June 5, 2012.

== Promotion and touring ==
The album's cover and track listing were announced April 20, 2012. On May 15, "200,000", "Revival", and the album's lead single "Run and Don't Stop" were previewed on the band's Facebook page via Spotify. On the same day, a video for "Run and Don't Stop" was released as well as a free download of the single alongside Bryce Avary, His Instruments and Your Voices. January 14, 2012, the album's track listing was announced on Facebook. On May 23, 2012, the track "Old Love" was available for streaming on the Guitar World website.

As the album was being announced and promoted, the Rocket Summer was on tour with Switchfoot. At the conclusion of the Switchfoot tour, the Rocket Summer will begin a U.S. headlining tour alongside States and Scene Aesthetic to promote Life Will Write the Words.

== Production ==
The album was recording during August and September 2011 in Dallas/Fort Worth at Producer/Engineer Rokks' personal studio as well as Harbor House Studios. Avary added new instruments to the mix, including a mandolin, a banjo, some trashcans and a typewriter, resulting in an energetic, electrified album. As with previous albums, Avary wrote and performed every note on this album.

“I really wanted to push myself musically and lyrically with this album, searching to pull out the stories within and around me," explains Avary. "I like to write songs that are an honest reflection of what’s going on in my life and in my mind while I observe and attempt to learn more about myself and this beautiful, intense world we live in.”

Regarding the album title, 'Life Will Write the Words', Avary says, "To me, that phrase in a sense captures a bit of the human experience. I believe there’s a song in everything. Literally everything you look at, you can pull a song out of it. We all have a song, we all have a story.”

== Track listing ==
All tracks are written by Bryce Avary.

| No. | Title | Length |
|---|---|---|
| 1. | "Run and Don't Stop" | 3:22 |
| 2. | "Revival" | 3:33 |
| 3. | "Prove It" | 3:43 |
| 4. | "Old Love" | 3:47 |
| 5. | "200,000" | 4:07 |
| 6. | "Just for A Moment Forget Who You Are" | 4:00 |
| 7. | "Circa '46" | 3:40 |
| 8. | "Underrated" | 3:47 |
| 9. | "Soldiers" | 3:25 |
| 10. | "The Rescuing Type" | 3:59 |
| 11. | "Scrapbook" | 4:09 |
| 12. | "Ashes Made of Spades" | 4:39 |

== Personnel ==
The Rocket Summer

- Bryce Avary – vocals, electric guitar, acoustic guitar, bass, drums, percussion, synthesizers, organ, keyboards, production, string arrangement

Additional personnel

- Rokks – Recording Engineer
- Rokks – Mix Engineer
- Nolan Brett – Mastering Engineer
- Tara Avary – Photographer
- RL | Cameron – Photographer

== Charts ==
Chart performance
| Chart (2012) | Peak position |
|---|---|
| Canadian Albums (Nielsen SoundScan) | 175 |
| US Billboard 200 | 58 |
| US Independent Albums (Billboard) | 12 |
| US Top Alternative Albums (Billboard) | 12 |
| US Top Christian Albums (Billboard) | 2 |
| US Top Rock Albums (Billboard) | 23 |
