= Of Men and Angels =

Studio album by The Rocket Summer
- Released: February 23, 2010
- Recorded: March–August 2009 at: Ocean Studios (Burbank, CA, United States); Pedernales Studios (Austin, TX, United States)
- Genre: Pop rock
- Length: 55:15
- Label: Island Def Jam
- Producers: Bryce Avary, CJ Eriksson

The Rocket Summer chronology
You Gotta Believe (2009)	Of Men and Angels (2010)	Life Will Write the Words (2012)

Singles from Of Men and Angels
- 1. "Walls" Released: February 23, 2010

Of Men and Angels is the fourth full-length studio album by American pop rock artist The Rocket Summer, and was released on February 23, 2010. The album debuted at No. 1 on iTunes, surpassing The Black Eyed Peas' The E.N.D. which had previously held the #1 spot for Top Album. Three songs on the album were initially featured on the 2009 extended play, You Gotta Believe. Leading up to the album debut, The Rocket Summer released the entire album for preview on The Rocket Summer MySpace on February 15, 2010, just eight days prior to the in-store release.

The Rocket Summer recorded the new album at Ocean Studios in Burbank, CA, from February to April 2009, undertaking mixing with Neal Avron in May 2009. Frontman Bryce Avary played all of the instruments on the record and produced the album with CJ Eiriksson.

== Production ==
Avary recorded the album in Ocean Studios in Burbank, CA, from February to April 2009, and later wrote and recorded new songs in Austin, TX, while waiting for industry issues to clear. In creating the record, Avary intended "to keep the record as organic as possible." As a result, Avary minimized the chopping of the drums, did not use Autotune on the vocals, and featured longer takes on the guitar. Avary additionally mixed some of the tracks with Neal Avron, and produced the album with CJ Eiriksson.

The album's title and title track Of Men and Angels comes from the Bible verse 1 Corinthians 13: "If I speak in the tongues of men and of angels, but I have not love, I am only a resounding gong or a clanging cymbal" (NIV). The title track is what Avary considers to be "spiritually charged," despite the self-made distinction of not being a "Christian" band when it comes to categorizing The Rocket Summer's music.

On January 8, 2010, The Rocket Summer announced the Of Men and Angels cover art, which features a thoughtful Avary leaning against a white, concrete wall. Opposite the wall is an ink-drawn angel, pushing away a black burst; the black burst accords with what Avary has termed in interviews as life's troubles. Avary has also stated that the artwork represents his perceived reality, where "sometimes things are actually supposed to be even worse than they are."

== Release and promotion ==
On January 13, 2010, the lead single "Walls" premiered on the band's MySpace, and on January 14, 2010, the album's track listing was announced on Facebook. Preceding the in-store album release, the music video for the album's second single "Hills and Valleys" was released on February 22, 2010.

To promote the new album, Avary performed the album's lead single "Walls" on KDFW's Good Day Dallas and KTBC's Good Day Austin, and held a hometown album release party at the Granada Theatre in Dallas, TX, where Matt Thiessen of Relient K and a contest-winning unsigned band opened. Leading up to the album debut, The Rocket Summer released the entire album for preview on The Rocket Summer MySpace on February 15, 2010, just eight days prior to the in-store release.

=== Touring ===
Starting March 13, 2010, The Rocket Summer commenced a two-week tour with OneRepublic and Goo Goo Dolls. Avary also played an acoustic set at the SXSW Music + Film + Interactive Conference in Austin, TX, on March 20, 2010, and performed at the Slam Dunk festival on May 30. He additionally performed at the 16th annual Vans Warped Tour 2010, which opened in California the last weekend of June 2010 and ran through August 15, 2010.

Prior to the album release, in October 2009, The Rocket Summer headlined a 34-city North American tour to promote the album.

== Critical reception ==
Professional ratings
Review scores
Source	Rating
Allmusic	4/5 stars

Of Men and Angels has received much critical acclaim since its debut. Allmusic's George Heaney likened Avary's voice to Michael Jackson's, stating that "Avary’s Michael Jackson-esque voice soars high over sunny power pop riffs, giving the listener a nice respite from the half-sung/half-screamed vocals that seemed to have fully infiltrated the world of emo rock." Mario Tarradell of The Dallas Morning News gave the album a strong, positive review, stating that Of Men and Angels could be "the brink of [Avary's] mainstream pop breakthrough."

== Singles ==
- "Walls" was the lead single from Of Men and Angels and was released in February 2010. In an interview with AOL, Avary stated that the song is "about struggles and about having issues in your life that you just can't seem to quite get a grip on, whether that's depression or whether that's anything."
- "Hills and Valleys" was the second single from Of Men and Angels and was released on February 22, 2010, along with its music video. Its release coincided with the in-store album release.
- "You Gotta Believe" was the title single from the 4-song You Gotta Believe EP released on December 7, 2009, in advance of the album Of Men and Angels. Coinciding with its release was also its accompanying music video, directed by the award-winning Randy Slavin.

== Track listing ==
All tracks are written by Bryce Avary.

No.	Title	Length
1.	"Roses"	3:46
2.	"You Gotta Believe"	3:16
3.	"Hills and Valleys"	3:45
4.	"I Want Something to Live For"	3:59
5.	"Walls"	4:48
6.	"Pull Myself Together (Don't Hate Me)"	3:34
7.	"Of Men and Angels"	3:45
8.	"I Need a Break…But I'd Rather Have a Breakthrough"	3:27
9.	"Nothing Matters"	3:24
10.	"Japanese Exchange Student"	3:37
11.	"Tara, I'm Terrible"	3:01
12.	"Hey!"	2:43
13.	"Let You Go"	4:26
14.	"This Is a Refuge"	3:49
15.	"Light"	4:02
Total length:		55:15

== Personnel ==
The Rocket Summer

- Bryce Avary – vocals, electric guitar, acoustic guitar, bass, drums, percussion, synthesizers, organ, keyboards, production, string arrangement

Additional personnel

- C.J. Eriksson – production, engineering, mixing on tracks 6, 10 and 13, programming
- Neal Avron – mixing
- Nicolas Fournier – mixing
- Gavin Lurssen – mastering
- Tara Avary – backing vocals on tracks 1, 3, 4 and 5
- Seth Brewton – backing vocals on tracks 1, 3, 4 and 5, guitar on track 7
- Josh Venable – handclaps on track 3
- Deedle Lacour – handclaps on track 3
- Stevie Blacke – strings on tracks 5 and 13, string arrangement
- Albert Mata – engineering
- Jared Dodd – engineering
- Steve Rokks – engineering
- Will Kreinke – engineering
- Erich Talaba – engineering
- Reuben Cohen – engineering

== Charts ==
Chart performance for Of Men and Angels
Chart (2010)	Peak position
New Zealand Albums (RMNZ)	30
US Billboard 200	38
US Top Alternative Albums (Billboard)	3
US Top Rock Albums (Billboard)	4
