= Slingshot 57 =

American Christian rock band

Slingshot 57 was a Christian rock band from Lincoln, Illinois, United States, which was formed in 1999. They played 450 shows in 23 states. The name was inspired by the Biblical story of David and Goliath and Psalm 57.

== History ==
Slingshot 57 originated from Lincoln Christian College and gained a following in central Illinois. They received heavy national radio airplay in 2001–02 with their single "Everyday". They recorded two full-length albums, performed with several major label acts, and had songs played on three consecutive seasons of MTV's The Real World. The band toured nationally with CIY Believe Conferences (also original band) and played festivals, state fairs and teen conventions, from bars to churches, parties to high school auditoriums.

In 2003, four of the members left to pursue other ministries. Kirk Bolen went to St. Charles, Missouri, to become a worship minister. Ross Drennan went to Springfield to become a children's minister. Matt Harris is now in Colorado as a campus minister. Gabe Rutledge is a Bible teacher in Springfield. A new line-up included Nash Bruce (guitar, vocals), Neill Nation (guitar), Paul Stewart (bass guitar), and Nick McNeely (drums, vocals).

In June 2005, McNeely left the band, with Nation following in April 2006; both joined the rock band Bastian. After they left, Daniel Bishop was recruited to play drums, Tim Wilson was added as the band's new bass guitarist, and Stewart moved to rhythm guitar.

Slingshot 57 played their final show on November 17, 2007, in Mahomet, Illinois, with the bands The Switch and Dear Future.

Woods is the founder of a non-profit discipleship movement called The Brave Way Home.

== Members ==
- Ben Woods (1999–2007)
- Kirk Bolen (1999–2003)
- Ross Drennan (1999–2003)
- Matt Harris (1999–2003)
- Gabe Rutledge (1999–2003)
- Neill Nation (2003–2006)
- Nick McNeely (2003–2006)
- Nash Bruce (2003–2007)
- Gregory (Paul) Stewart (2003–2007)
- Tim Wilson (2006–2007)
- Daniel Bishop (2006–2007)

== Discography ==
- 5 Smooth Stones (2000)
- Stay the Course (2002)
- Slingshot 57 EP (2004)
- The Evidence (2007) (released on iTunes)
