= Apache Beat =

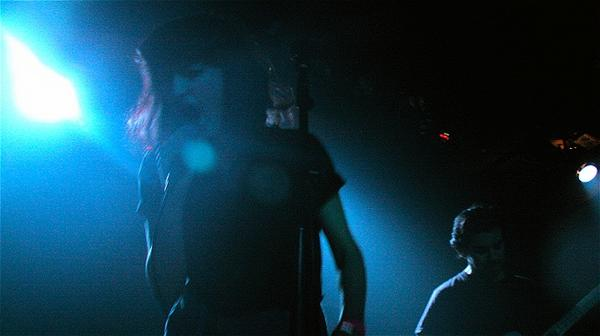

Background information
- Origin: Brooklyn, New York, United States
- Genres: Punk-wave; indie rock; art rock; experimental rock; shoegaze
- Years active: 2007-2012
- Labels: Babylon, Inertia
- Members: Michael Dossantos; Ilirjana Alushaj; Phillip Aceto; Christina Aceto; Angus Tarnawsky; Neil Westgate

Apache Beat were a five-piece New York band formed in 2007.

After putting out a slew of singles, Apache Beat released their debut album Last Chants in October 2010. It was recorded, mixed and produced by Martin Bisi and John Agnello in New York and put out on both Inertia Records and Babylon Records. The record had guest performers from Yeah Yeah Yeahs, The Rapture and Blood Orange.

They have toured in the US, UK and Europe playing with such as School of Seven Bells, Gossip, Deerhunter, Crystal Castles, Les Savy Fav and We Are Scientists.

Their sound was inspired by everything from post-punk to krautrock, with their name coming from a term used by Klaus Dinger of Neu! to describe the motorik drum beat.

== Members ==
- Michael Dos Santos
- Ilirjana Alushaj
- Phillip Aceto
- Neil Westgate
- Christina Aceto
- Angus Tarnawsky

== Discography ==
=== Singles ===
- Tracing Sky - digital only (May 28, 2012)
- Another Day (Single Version) - Limited 7" & digital (August 10, 2010)
- Your Powers Are Magic (Single Version) - digital only (September 29, 2009)
- Tropics (Single Version) - digital only (October 21, 2008)
- Blood Thrills / The Western - Limited 7" & digital (May 31, 2008)
- Tropics / Your Powers Are Magic - Limited 7" only (October 18, 2007)

=== Albums ===
- Last Chants - Full Length (October 5, 2010)

"A big leap forward for the dynamic Brooklyn-based post-punk band, especially when Ilirjana Alushaj channel[s] Patti Smith and P.J. Harvey." – The Wall Street Journal
REVIEWS:
Contactmusic.com: 6/10
Pitchfork: 6.1/10
PopMatters: 9/10
URB: 3.5/5
