= Do You Feel =

Studio album by the Rocket Summer
- Released: July 17, 2007
- Recorded: November 2006 – January 2007
- Studios: Sunset Sound (Hollywood, CA, United States); Fox Force Five (Hollywood, CA, United States); Conway (Los Angeles, United States); 4th Street Recording (Santa Monica, CA, United States)
- Genres: Pop rock, power pop, pop punk
- Length: 46:06
- Label: Island Records
- Producers: Jim Wirt, Bryce Avary

The Rocket Summer chronology
| iTunes EP (2007) | Do You Feel (2007) | You Gotta Believe (2009) |

Professional ratings
Review scores
| Source | Rating |
|---|---|
| Allmusic | 4.5/5 stars |
| For The Sound | 4.5/5 stars |

Do You Feel is the Rocket Summer's third full-length album, released on July 17, 2007, through Island Records. On this album, Bryce Avary incorporates more diverse instrumentation, including saxophone.

Initially available on MySpace on July 10, the entire album was leaked onto the Internet on July 13. Following its release, the album debuted at number 44 on the U.S. Billboard 200, selling about 15,000 copies in its first week.

The music video for "Do You Feel" featured the band performing as a quartet, and also features Josh Farro of Novel American and formerly of Paramore and Jeremy Davis of Paramore, Andrew McMahon of Jack's Mannequin, Matt Thiessen of Relient K, Ian Crawford and Cash Colligan formerly of the Cab, Forrest Kline of Hellogoodbye, Mike Herrera of MxPx, Alex Gaskarth of All Time Low, and Jonathan Cook of Forever the Sickest Kids.

== Track listing ==
All tracks are written by Bryce Avary.

| No. | Title | Length |
|---|---|---|
| 1. | "Break It Out" | 2:47 |
| 2. | "So Much Love" | 3:56 |
| 3. | "Do You Feel" | 2:41 |
| 4. | "Save" | 3:54 |
| 5. | "All I Have" | 4:07 |
| 6. | "High Life Scenery" | 3:23 |
| 7. | "A Song Is Not a Business Plan" | 3:30 |
| 8. | "Taken Aback" | 3:44 |
| 9. | "Colors" | 3:16 |
| 10. | "Run to You" | 3:48 |
| 11. | "Hold It Up" | 2:55 |
| 12. | "Waiting" | 3:28 |
| 13. | "So, in This Hour..." | 5:49 |

iTunes bonus track
| No. | Title | Writer(s) | Length |
|---|---|---|---|
| 14. | "I Just Don't Think I'll Ever Get Over You" | Colin Hay | 5:00 |

== Personnel ==
The Rocket Summer

- Bryce Avary – vocals, guitar, bass, cello, drums, piano, percussion, organ, wurlitzer, synthesizers, harmonica, production

Additional personnel

- Jim Wirt – production, bass on track 12
- C. J. Eriksson – recording engineering
- Chris Lord-Alge – mixing
- Ted Jensen – mastering
- Graham Hope – engineering
- Max Coane – engineering
- Sam Holland – engineering
- Neil Couser – engineering
- Chris Mullings – engineering
- Keith Armstrong – mixing
- Steve Madaio – trumpet on tracks 2 and 6
- Martin Gregg – saxophone on tracks 2 and 6
- Nicholas Lane – trombone on tracks 2 and 6
- Patrick Warren – chamberlin on tracks 10 and 13

== Charts ==
| Chart (2007) | Peak position |
|---|---|
| US Billboard 200 | 44 |
| US Top Alternative Albums (Billboard) | 15 |
| US Digital Albums (Billboard) | 23 |
| US Top Rock Albums (Billboard) | 16 |
