= The Rocket Summer =

Solo project of American singer-songwriter Bryce Avary

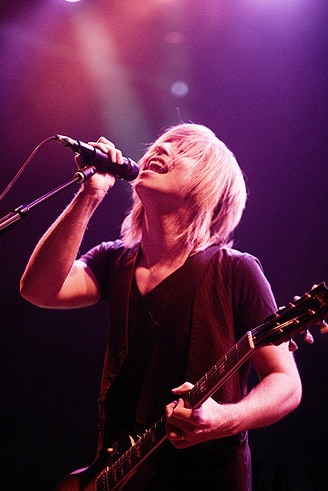
- The Rocket Summer in 2008

Background information
- Origin: Dallas–Fort Worth, Texas, United States
- Genres: Alternative rock; indie rock; pop-punk; pop rock; power pop; emo pop
- Years active: 1999–present
- Labels: The Militia Group; Island; Aviate
- Members: Bryce Avary
- Website: www.therocketsummer.com

The Rocket Summer is the solo project of Bryce Avary, a multi-instrumentalist, singer-songwriter, and record producer based in Dallas–Fort Worth, Texas.

He has released eight studio albums and several EPs. His fifth release, 2012's Life Will Write the Words, reached No. 58 on The Billboard 200 and No. 12 on Billboard Top Modern Rock/Alternative Albums chart as well as No. 12 on Top Independent Albums chart. His fourth release, Of Men and Angels, held the No. 1 Top Album spot on iTunes upon its release in 2010. AP Magazine called him one of "100 bands you need to know."

== Early life and musical interest ==
Avary was born in Fort Worth, Texas. He first became interested in music around the age of 12 when his father bought him his first guitar which was an imitation brand from a pawn shop for 50 dollars. Avary subsequently began teaching himself other instruments including the drums and piano.

Avary joined his first band at the age of 14. He later joined a high school "indie rock punk" band at Grapevine High School where he was also a photographer of the school's yearbook, inspired by Pavement, Archers of Loaf and Weezer, called Charlie 27. After the band broke up, Avary began performing local acoustic shows as a teenager in Dallas, Fort Worth and Denton.

== Music career ==
=== 2000–2003: Self-titled EP ===
In 2000, Avary self-released his first EP at the age of 17. The EP included songs he had written between the ages of 14 and 16. He distributed the EP under the name The Rocket Summer, at the suggestion of a friend, to local stores to be sold on consignment; the name was inspired by Ray Bradbury's short story collection The Martian Chronicles, which his friend was reading at the time. Avary described the project as initially "just a really fun experiment." After the EP's original 1000 copies sold out, it went out of print until it was later re-released as The Early Years EP under The Militia Group in November 2006.

His music appeared on The Adventure Club (with Josh Venable) segment of the KDGE radio station, and quickly became the most requested local band on the program that year.

=== 2003–2005: Calendar Days and Hello, Good Friend ===
Avary recorded, produced, and released his debut album, Calendar Days, in 2003. The album was recorded in Eudora, Kansas.

In November 2004, Avary began working on his second album, Hello, Good Friend. The album peaked at No. 26 on the Billboard Heatseekers chart. To promote the album, The Rocket Summer toured the US and Japan.

=== 2005–2008: The Early Years EP and Do You Feel ===
In November 2006, The Militia Group re-released The Rocket Summer's self-released 1999 EP as The Early Years EP, and Avary signed with major record label Island Def Jam Records. Do You Feel was released in July 2007; the album reached No. 44 on the Billboard 200 and No. 16 on the Billboard Top Rock Albums charts.

The album's lead single, "So Much Love", was warmly received by critics for its uniqueness and use of a horn section. The "So Much Love" music video was directed by MTV Music Video Award-winning director Shane Drake. The Rocket Summer released the second single, "Do You Feel", and its music video on September 5, 2008. The video was co-directed and funded by Bryce Avary with director Nate Weaver. The video featured stories of people with issues such as homelessness, addiction, disease and abuse. The video also featured cameos from artists Andrew McMahon of Jack's Mannequin, Matt Thiessen of Relient K, Josh Farro and Jeremy Davis of Paramore, Mike Herrera of MxPx, Forrest Kline of Hellogoodbye and Alex Gaskarth of All Time Low.

Avary was featured on the cover of Alternative Press Magazine while co-headlining the AP Tour.

=== 2008–2011: You Gotta Believe EP, Of Men and Angels and Bryce Avary, His Instruments and Your Voices ===
Avary recorded his fourth studio album, Of Men and Angels at Ocean Studios in Burbank, CA, from February to April 2009. Mixed with Neal Avron and engineered / co-produced with CJ Eiriksson, Avary described the album as "the most substance-filled Rocket Summer album to date." The Rocket Summer released a digital 4-track EP entitled You Gotta Believe in October 2009. The EP featured three tracks off the LP Of Men and Angels and one bonus track. The EP debuted at No. 23 on the Billboard charts for Digital Albums. The video for the title song was directed by director Randy Scott Slavin.

On February 23, 2010, The Rocket Summer released his fourth studio album, 'Of Men and Angels on Island Def Jam. The album debuted at No. 1 on iTunes, surpassing The Black Eyed Peas' The E.N.D. which had previously held the No. 1 spot for Top Album. To promote the new album, Avary performed the album's lead single "Walls" on KDFW's Good Day Dallas and KTBC's Good Day Austin. The Rocket Summer toured with OneRepublic, Goo Goo Dolls and the 16th annual Vans Warped Tour in promotion of the record. On October 19, 2010, The Rocket Summer released a five-song digital-only EP, entitled Of Men and Angels: B-Sides. Avary co-wrote the song "Stomping The Roses" for American Idol alum, David Archuleta which appeared on his second full-length album, The Other Side Of Down debuted in October 2010.

=== 2011–2014: Life Will Write the Words and Christmas Madness EP ===
On June 5, 2012, The Rocket Summer released their fifth full-length studio album, Life Will Write the Words on their own record label Aviate Records. It debuted 58 on The Billboard 200 and 12 on The Billboard Top Modern Rock/Alternative Albums and 12 on the Top Independent Albums charts. This record was well received by fans who enjoyed a full Rocket Summer US Tour. Soon after releasing the album, the music video "200,000" debuted on Alternative Press.

The Rocket Summer digitally released 'Christmas Madness EP' on Aviate Records December 3, 2013 debuting 45 on Billboard's Top Independent Albums and performed two sold-out shows in Anaheim and Dallas to support this digital release.

=== 2015–2018: Zoetic, Do You Feel 10 Year Anniversary, Gone Too Long single ===
Avary's sixth full-length album Zoetic released on February 26, 2016. The album has received the most favorable reviews to date. Alternative Press magazine gave the album 4.5 of 5 stars stating "the album proves true to its namesake by roaring to life with unyielding passion, authenticity and a whole lot of guitars." A music video was shot for the first single "Same Air" which features New Girl actress, Hannah Simone. New Noise Magazine writes "This is undoubtedly The Rocket Summer's best release, and it's an album that no one expected." HM Magazine states "The intimacy of his performances is impossible to shake, and with a new record that will no doubt be labeled his boldest, Zoetic's bravery will go down in history." Paste Magazine wrote "The Rocket Summer's new album Zoetic proves Bryce a master at creating catchy, upbeat anthems."

The Rocket Summer performed a DJ set at Emo Nite in Los Angeles in December 2016.

In the summer of 2017, The Rocket Summer celebrated the 10 Year Anniversary of the album, Do You Feel which included a first time release of the album on vinyl and a headlining tour of North America and the UK. The vinyl album debuted #20 on the Billboard Vinyl Album Charts upon its release in June.

On July 7, Avary released a new song titled, Gone Too Long. Billboard writes "the new track proves he is just as much of a force as ever. With a guitar-driven melody and impassioned lyrics, the one-man band is in top form in a song that will easily fit with the alt-pop tendencies of staples like "So Much Love" and "You Gotta Believe." The track was released digitally and on a limited edition cassette tape which included an acoustic version of FL, CA, and was later included on Bee Sides: Select Rarities 2015-2020.

In the summer of 2018, The Rocket Summer went on an 26 city acoustic tour, supporting Sleeping with Sirens. Avary co-wrote, co-produced, and performed with Sleeping with Sirens on a single called "Another Day", released on July 6, 2018.

=== 2019 - 2022: Sweet Shivers, B.A.treon Fun Club, Bee Sides: Select Rarities 2015-2020 ===
Sweet Shivers, the seventh studio album by The Rocket Summer, was released on August 2, 2019. The album release was followed by "The Rocket Summer US Tour 2019", beginning on September 10, 2019 and ending on October 19, 2019. Supporting acts included Royal Teeth, Mike Mains and The Branches, and Katelyn Tarver. The first single from the album, "Shatter Us", was released on May 24, 2019. Billboard Magazine stated "Sweet Shivers really is just the beginning."

On September 4, 2019, Avary launched the B.A.treon Fun Club through Patreon. Initial monthly perks for Fun Club subscribers included 2 unreleased tracks, "q & a hangs", occasional dissection of songs and mixes, merch and tour discounts, livestream music listening parties, and online livestream mini shows from Bryce's studio. Different perks and subscription tiers were introduced on July 13, 2020.

On October 27, 2020, Avary announced a new album, Bee Sides: Select Rarities 2015-2020, to be released on November 13, 2020, containing 14 tracks. 11 of the 14 tracks had been previously released in the Fun Club. The announcement included a vinyl pre-order.

The Fun Club would go on what was believed to be a temporary pause beginning in March 2021, yet, as of 2023, the Club has remained defunct with the exception of two separate one-off months.

A new single, "M4U", debuted digitally on November 18, 2022, and was followed by both a music video and cassingle release. The cassingle included a remixed version of the song, exclusive to the cassingle.

=== 2023 - Current: Shadowkasters and Calendar Days 20th Anniversary ===
A second single, "Stuck Inside Your Light", was digitally released on January 20, 2023 and its release was accompanied by a music video.

On March 21, 2023, it was announced The Rocket Summer's eighth studio album, Shadowkasters, would be released on May 12, 2023 and feature 11 tracks. A pre-order was launched the same day, to include vinyl variants, glow-in-the-dark cassettes, CDs, pins, hoodies, and shirts. Avary, "A lot of this album has been done for quite some time and was made during the isolation period of the pandemic, so it's almost like a compilation album of songs recorded over a couple of years that I felt made sense together in a sequence... Still, there was a different energy that fueled many of these songs that came from seeking joy by way of discovering, manipulating, and getting lost in new sounds because I was simply alone for so much of it. It is by far the most instrumentally nuanced album I've ever made." Recent singles "M4U" and "Stuck Inside Your Light" will be part of the album, and a third single, "Sing At The Top" would be released on March 24, 2023.

In November 2023, Avary announced he would be embarking on a 20th anniversary headlining tour of Calendar Days in early 2024. Avary, "Celebrating 20+ years of The Rocket Summer by performing my first full-length album [C]alendar [D]ays in its entirety, as well as an additional set of songs from every album to date... [T]he album will indeed officially be 21 by the first show kick off, so I suppose it's technically more like a raging 21st birthday party night after night." For the last show of the tour, in Dallas, a few members of Avary's younger sister's middle school choir who sang the background vocals on "What We Hate, We Make" joined him on stage for the song. A vinyl re-release of the album was made available prior to the tour and for sale during the tour.

A new single, "Don't Be Yourself", was digitally released on February 23, 2024.

== Musical style and influence ==
Often labeled as indie rock and power pop with emphasis on Avary's distinctive vocals and instrumental diversity.

Rick Anderson of Allmusic described his music as a range of "headlong blasts of pure power pop cheer" to "sonata form" and ballads—all of which Anderson categorized as "infectiously joyful." The Rocket Summer's music is marked by his use of guitar, piano, bass, percussion, and melodic hooks.

== Discography ==
=== Studio albums ===
- Calendar Days (2003)
- Hello, Good Friend (2005)
- Do You Feel (2007)
- Of Men and Angels (2010)
- Life Will Write The Words (2012)
- Zoetic (2016)
- Sweet Shivers (2019)
- Shadowkasters (2023)
