= Loftin =

Loftin is an English surname, which is also occasionally used as a middle name. Notable people with the name include:

== Surname ==
- Megan Gibson-Loftin (born 1986), American softball coach and player
- Brian Loftin (soccer) (born 1972), American soccer player
- Carey Loftin (1914–1997), American stuntman
- Colin Loftin (contemporary), American criminologist
- Nicholas Loftin (contemporary), American record producer
- Nick Loftin (born 1998), American baseball player
- Nikki Loftin (born 1972), American fiction author
- Peter Loftin (1958–2019), American telecom entrepreneur
- R. Bowen Loftin (born 1949), American academic
- Robert Loftin (1938–1993), American ornithologist
- Scott Loftin (1878–1953), American politician in Florida
- Tiffany Dena Loftin (contemporary), American director in the NAACP

=== Middle name ===
- Albert Loftin Johnson (1860–1901), American business executive and baseball owner
- Tom Loftin Johnson (1854–1911), American politician in Ohio
- Tom Loftin Johnson (artist) (1900–1963), American painter and art teacher
- Robert Loftin Newman (1827–1912), American painter
- Martha Loftin Wilson (1834–1919), American missionary worker and journal editor

=== Given name ===
- Loftin K. Pratt (died 1846), American politician and judge from North Carolina

== See also ==
- Lofting, surname
- Lofton, surname
- Loftin Farm, a farm in North Carolina, United States
