= Loughton (surname) =

Loughton is an English surname. It is a toponymic surname derived from the English town of the same name, Loughton.

Notable people with the surname include:

- Alex Loughton (born 1983), Australian basketball player
- John Loughton (born 1987), Scottish political activist and celebrity TV star
- Mick Loughton (born 1942), English footballer
- Tim Loughton (born 1962), British Conservative MP since 1997
- William Loughton Smith (1758–1812), US lawyer and member of the House of Representatives from 1789 to 1797

== See also ==
- Lofton, surname
- Loftin, surname
- Lofting, surname
