= Lofting (surname) =

Lofting is an English surname. It is a variant of the surname Loughton, and thus is a toponymic surname derived from the English town of the same name, Loughton.

Notable people with the name include:

- Hugh Lofting (1886–1947), English-American writer who created Doctor Dolittle
- Hilary Lofting (1881–1939), Australian novelist and editor
- Morgan Lofting (1940–2024), American actress
- John Lofting (1659–1742), Dutch engineer and entrepreneur

== See also ==
- Loftin, surname
- Lofton, surname
