= Loftsson =

Loftsson is a surname of Icelandic origin. Notable people with the name include:

- Jóhannes Loftsson (born 1973), Icelandic politician
- Jón Loftsson (1124–1197), Icelandic chieftain
- Kristján Loftsson (born 1943), Icelandic businessman

== See also ==
- Lofton, surname
