= Tiffany Dena Loftin =

American activist

Tiffany Dena Loftin is the National Director of the NAACP Youth & College Division at the NAACP. She was born and raised in Los Angeles, California. She was appointed by President Barack Obama to serve on the White House Initiative on Educational Excellence for African Americans in Higher Education.

== Juneteenth 2020 ==
On June 19, 2020, Loftin told PEOPLE.com that "The significance of Juneteenth has always been meaningful in the Black community. However, in the face of the continuous onslaught of racial incidents, police brutality and killings, and hate crimes, we're witnessing a renewed effort to uplift holidays that bring attention to the real history of this country."

== 2020 Presidential Election ==
In May 2020, Democratic candidate Joe Biden stated that he would pick a woman of color to be his running mate during the 2020 presidential election. USA Today reported that "The presumptive Democratic nominee vowed in March to pick a woman as his vice presidential running mate. Leaders within crucial factions of the Democratic base – black and Latino voters – say that's not enough for the standard-bearer of a party that touts its diversity and relies on the steadfast support of voters of color to win." Loftin said in a statement to USA Today that regardless of who becomes the vice presidential pick for the Biden campaign, black voters must recognize how "dangerous it would be to have Donald Trump be our president for the next four years."
