= Lofton =

Lofton is an English surname that is occasionally used as a given name. Notable people with the name include:

== Surname ==
- Cirroc Lofton (born 1978), American actor
- Chris Lofton (born 1986), American basketball player
- Curtis Lofton (born 1986), American NFL football linebacker
- David Lofton (born 1984), American Canadian Football League football safety
- Eric Lofton (born 1993), Canadian Football League offensive lineman
- James Lofton (born 1956), former American NFL football wide receiver and coach
- James Lofton (baseball) (born 1974), American former Major League Baseball shortstop
- John Lofton (1941–2014), American political commentator and editor
- Kenneth Lofton Jr. (born 2002), American Israeli Basketball Premier League and NBA basketball player
- Kenny Lofton (born 1967), American Major League Baseball outfielder
- Oscar Lofton (1938–2026), American football player and coach
- Ramona Lofton (born 1950), nicknamed Sapphire African-American author and performance poet
- Saab Lofton, American author, cartoonist and radio personality
- Steve Lofton (born 1968), American former American Football League cornerback
- Tricky Lofton (1930–1993), American jazz trombonist
- Willie Lofton (1897–1956 or c. 1962), American Blues musician

== Given name ==
- Lofton R. Henderson (1903–1942), American Marine Corps aviator

== See also ==
- Lofton Creek Records, an American country music record label
- Loftin, surname
- Loftsson, surname
