= Colin Loftin =

American sociologist and criminologist

- Education: University of North Carolina at Chapel Hill
- Scientific career
- Fields: Sociology, criminology
- Workplaces: University at Albany, SUNY
- Thesis: Warfare and Societal Complexity: A Cross-cultural Study of Organized Fighting in Preindustrial Societies (1971)

Colin Loftin is an American criminologist and Distinguished Professor at the University at Albany School of Criminal Justice. At the University at Albany, he is also the co-director of the Violence Research Group, along with David McDowall.

== Education and career ==
Loftin received his Ph.D. from the University of North Carolina at Chapel Hill in 1971. He was an assistant professor of sociology at Brown University from 1969 to 1976, after which he joined the faculty of the University of Michigan. In 1983, he became an associate professor at the University of Maryland at College Park, where he was promoted to full professor in 1985. In 1996, he joined the faculty of the University at Albany, where he was named a Distinguished Professor in 2014.

== Research ==
Loftin's research focuses on the application of statistics to the study of violence. This includes a 1991 study he authored with McDowall which found that rates of gun homicide and gun suicide in Washington, D.C. declined shortly after their handgun ban took effect. He has also studied public support for mandatory sentencing laws, finding that 90% of citizens surveyed in Detroit, Michigan supported such laws, and that 65% said they would support them even if they did not deter crime.
