= John Lofton =

American paleoconservative political commentator

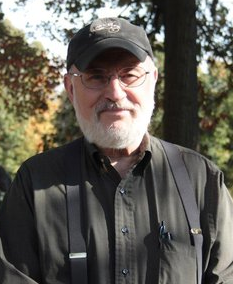
- Born: John D. Lofton, Jr. May 26, 1941
- Died: September 17, 2014 (aged 73)
- Political party: Republican; Constitution
- Movement: Paleoconservatism

John D. Lofton, Jr. (May 26, 1941 – September 17, 2014) was an American paleoconservative political commentator, editor, journalist, and political advisor.

== Career ==
=== Writing ===
Lofton edited Monday, the weekly publication of the Republican National Committee, between 1970 and 1973. He later became a syndicated columnist for United Features Syndicate whose columns appeared in 100 newspapers between 1973 and 1980. He became a columnist for the Washington Times in 1982. During his seven years at the Washington Times, Lofton became nationally known in print and on the nascent cable news circuit. He was also the editor of The American View, a radio program run by Michael Peroutka.

Lofton interviewed poet Allen Ginsberg in 1990 for Chronicles: A Magazine of American Culture. The interview was subsequently reprinted in Harper's Magazine.

=== Political campaign work ===
Describing himself as a "recovering Republican", Lofton was most closely allied with the Constitution Party. Lofton advised Pat Buchanan's presidential campaign and was the communications director for the Michael Peroutka presidential campaign in 2004.

== In popular culture ==
Lofton made numerous appearances on political talk shows, including The Political Cesspool, Politically Incorrect, Scarborough Country, and The Daily Show with Jon Stewart.

Lofton is perhaps best known for a 1986 appearance on Crossfire in which he debated musician Frank Zappa about the Parents Music Resource Center's campaign to identify music albums inappropriate for children. Lofton vehemently argued that the Founding Fathers of the United States did not mean to include lyrics like Zappa's under the protection of the First Amendment. He and Zappa argued while Zappa kept defending free speech, even if it implies taboo subject matter. In the debate, Lofton eventually called Zappa an idiot; Zappa responded, "Tell you what – kiss my ass! How do you like that?". The Crossfire video went viral after freeform radio station WFMU posted about it on its widely read blog in early 2006.

In a 1989 appearance on The Oprah Winfrey Show, Lofton and fellow conservative columnist Mona Charen debated with two homosexual couples on the subjects of gay adoption and the then-novel concept of same-sex marriage. Both Lofton and Charen argued that legally sanctioning such marriages would undermine the fabric of the American family.

== Personal life ==
=== Death ===
Lofton died on September 17, 2014, of a heart condition.
