= Loftin Farm =

Historic farm in North Carolina, United States

- U.S. National Register of Historic Places
- U.S. Historic district
- Location within North Carolina Location within the United States
- Location: NC 1368, 0.65 miles (1.05 km) south of the junction with NC 1367, near Beautancus, North Carolina
- Coordinates: 35°09′15″N 78°01′28″W
- Area: 15 acres (6.1 ha)
- Built: 1852, 1937
- Architectural style: Greek Revival, corner-notched plank
- MPS: Duplin County MPS
- NRHP reference No.: 01001426
- Added to NRHP: December 31, 2001

Loftin Farm is a historic farm and national historic district located near Beautancus, Duplin County, North Carolina. The district encompasses three contributing buildings. The house was built in 1852, and is a square one-story, hipped roof, wood-frame Greek Revival style cottage. Also on the property are the contributing smokehouse (1852) and livestock / hay barn (1937).

It was added to the National Register of Historic Places in 2001.
