= Robert Loftin Newman =

American painter

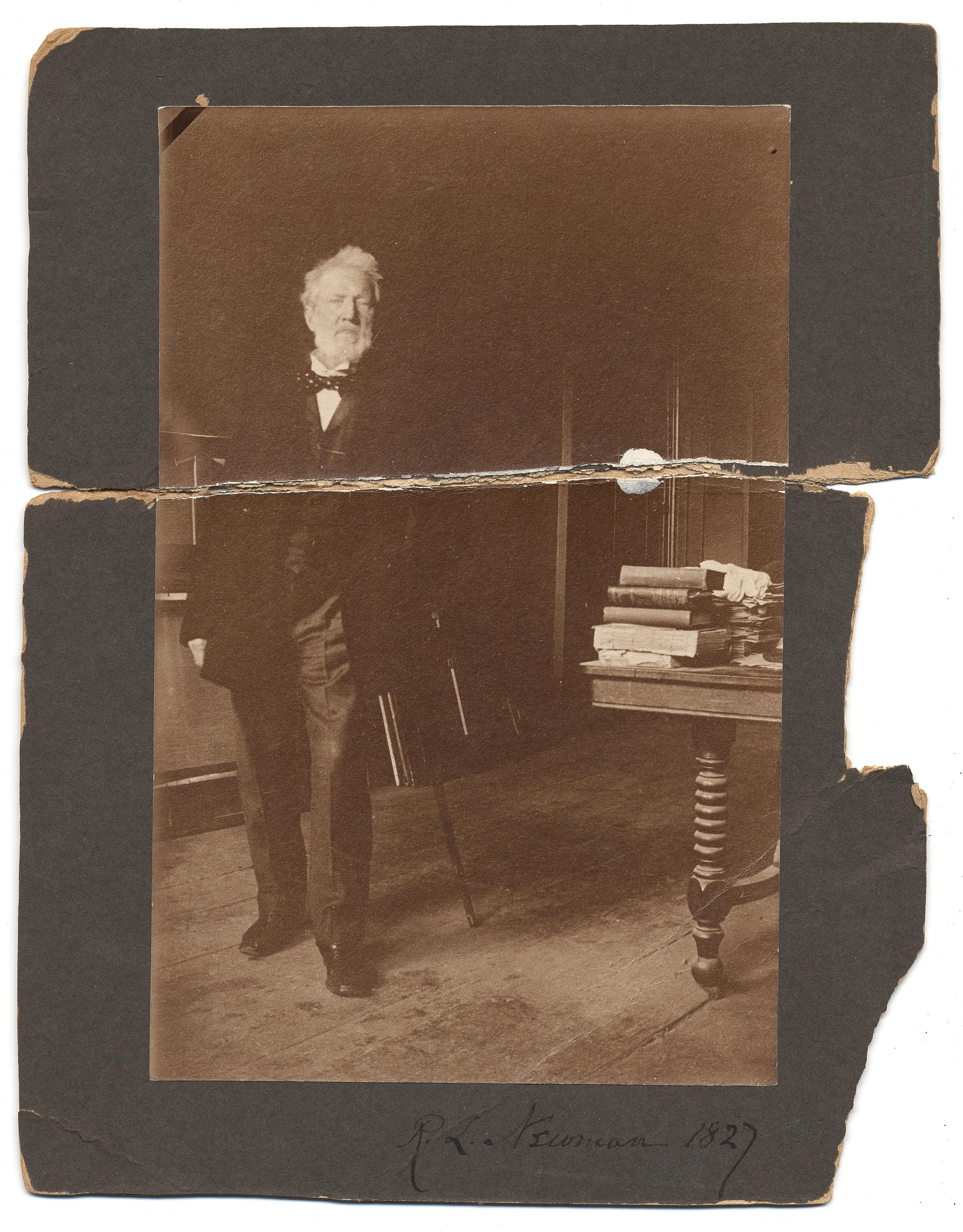
Photograph of Robert Loftin Newman, ca. 1900

Robert Loftin Newman (November 10, 1827 – March 31, 1912) was an American painter and stained-glass designer. He specialized in oil on canvas as his medium and is sometimes associated with Albert Pinkham Ryder as a painter of mood. Newman's works include Good Samaritan, painted in 1886, Flight into Egypt, Harvest Time, Sailboat Manned by Two Men, and The Bather.

== Biography ==
Newman was born in Richmond, Virginia, and moved to Clarksville, Tennessee, when he was 11 years of age. Later, as a young adult, he studied art in New York, England, and France. Newman served briefly as an artillery lieutenant for the Confederate Army during the American Civil War. He died of asphyxiation from a gas leak from a stove on March 31, 1912.
